= Food packaging =

Enclosure and protection of food

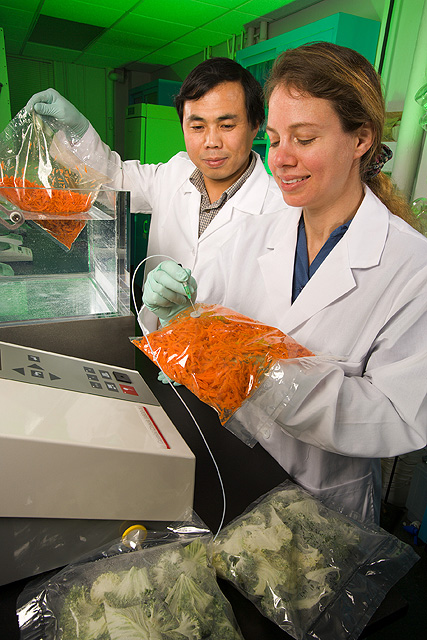
Testing modified atmosphere in a plastic bag of carrots

Food packaging is a packaging system specifically designed for food. It is one of the processes that make up the food system, having the role of providing protection from chemical, biological and physical alterations while the food travels from producers to the consumers. The main goal of food packaging is to provide a practical means of protecting and delivering food goods at a reasonable cost, while meeting the needs and expectations of both consumers and industries. Additionally, current trends like sustainability, environmental impact reduction, and shelf-life extension have gradually become some of the most important aspects in designing a packaging system.

== Functions ==
Packaging and the package's labeling have several objectives:

- Physical protection - The food enclosed in the package may require protection from shock, vibration, compression, temperature, bacteria, etc.
- Barrier protection - A barrier from oxygen, water vapor, dust, etc., is often required. Permeation is a critical factor in design. Keeping the contents clean, fresh, and safe for the intended shelf life is a primary function. Modified atmospheres or controlled atmospheres are also maintained in some food packages. Some packages contain desiccants, oxygen absorbers, or ethylene absorbers to help extend shelf life.
- Containment or agglomeration - Small items are typically grouped together in one package to allow efficient handling. Liquids, powders, and granular materials need containment.
- Information transmission - Packages and labels communicate how to use, transport, recycle, or dispose of the package or product. Some types of information are required by governments.
- Marketing - The packaging and labels can be used by marketers to encourage potential buyers to purchase the product. Aesthetically pleasing and eye-appealing food presentations can encourage people to consider the contents. Package design has been an important and constantly evolving phenomenon for several decades. Marketing communications and graphic design are applied to the surface of the package and (in many cases) also to the point of sale display. The colour of the package plays a significant role in evoking emotions that persuade the consumer to make the purchase.
- Security - Packaging can play an important role in reducing security risks for shipments. Packages can be made with improved tamper resistance to deter tampering, and can also have tamper-evident features to help indicate tampering. Packages can be engineered to help reduce the risk of package pilferage; some package constructions are more resistant to pilferage, and some have pilfer-indicating seals. Packages may include authentication seals to help indicate that the package and contents are not counterfeit. Packages also can include anti-theft devices, such as dye packs, RFID tags, or electronic article surveillance tags, that can be activated or detected by devices at exit points and require specialized tools to deactivate. Using packaging in this way is a means of retail loss prevention.
- Convenience - Packages can have features which add convenience in distribution, handling, stacking, display, sale, opening, reclosing, use, and reuse.
- Portion control - Single-serving packaging has a precise amount of contents to control usage. Bulk commodities (such as salt) can be divided into packages that are a more suitable size for individual households. It also aids the control of inventory: selling sealed one-liter bottles of milk, rather than having people bring their own bottles to fill themselves.

== Types ==
Packaging design may vary largely depending on the functions that are fashioned into different types of packages and containers, and depending on the food products and their functions, such as:

Packaging	Type	Foods	Materials
Aseptic packaging	Primary	Liquid whole eggs or dairy products	Polymers, multi-layer packaging
Trays	Primary	Portion of fish, meat, fruits, vegetable, sweets and convenience foods	Polymers, cardboards, biopolymers
Bags	Primary	Potato chips, apples, dried fruits, rice, snacks	Metallized polymers, polymers, multi-layer packaging
Cans	Primary	Can of tomato soup, beans, mais, salmon, tuna, and prawns	Aluminum, tin, stainless-steel
Cartons	Primary	Carton of eggs, milk, and fruit juice	Multi-layer packaging, coated paper
Flexible packaging	Primary	Bagged salad, potato chips, sweets and candies	Polymer, biopolymer
Boxes	Secondary	box of cereal cartons, frozen pizzas	Cardboards
Pallets	Tertiary	A series of boxes on a single pallet used to transport from the manufacturing plant to a distribution center	Corrugated cardboard, wooden pallet
Wrappers	Tertiary	Used to wrap the boxes on the pallet for transport	Polymer, multi-layer packaging

Since almost all food products are packed in some fashion, food packaging is both fundamental and pervasive. Additionally, by enabling the creation and standardization of brands, it provides the opportunity to realize significant advertising, extensive distribution, and mass merchandising. Therefore, a distinction between the various types (or levels) of packaging needs to be made.

=== Primary packaging ===
Primary packaging is directly in contact with the food products, creating the ideal headspace for them, while providing protection from external alteration. Additionally, primary packaging, also known as retail packaging or consumer units, is responsible for the marketing aspects of food packaging. Typically, the packaging materials used in the primary level include cardboard cartons, plastic trays, glass bottles and multi-layered structures (Tetra Pak).

=== Secondary packaging ===
Secondary packaging contains a number of primary packages into one box, being made usually out of corrugated cardboard. Thus, the secondary level is a physical distribution carrier for the primary packages, making them more easy to handle during transportation. Occasionally, it can be used as an aid in retail outlets or supermarkets for the display of basic goods.

=== Tertiary packaging ===
The outermost package, known as tertiary packaging, makes it easier to handle, store, and distribute both primary and secondary packages in bulk safely, providing further protection of the product while creating an easy way to transport large quantities of materials. The most familiar type of tertiary packaging comprises a wrapped pallet of corrugated cases.

=== Gallery ===
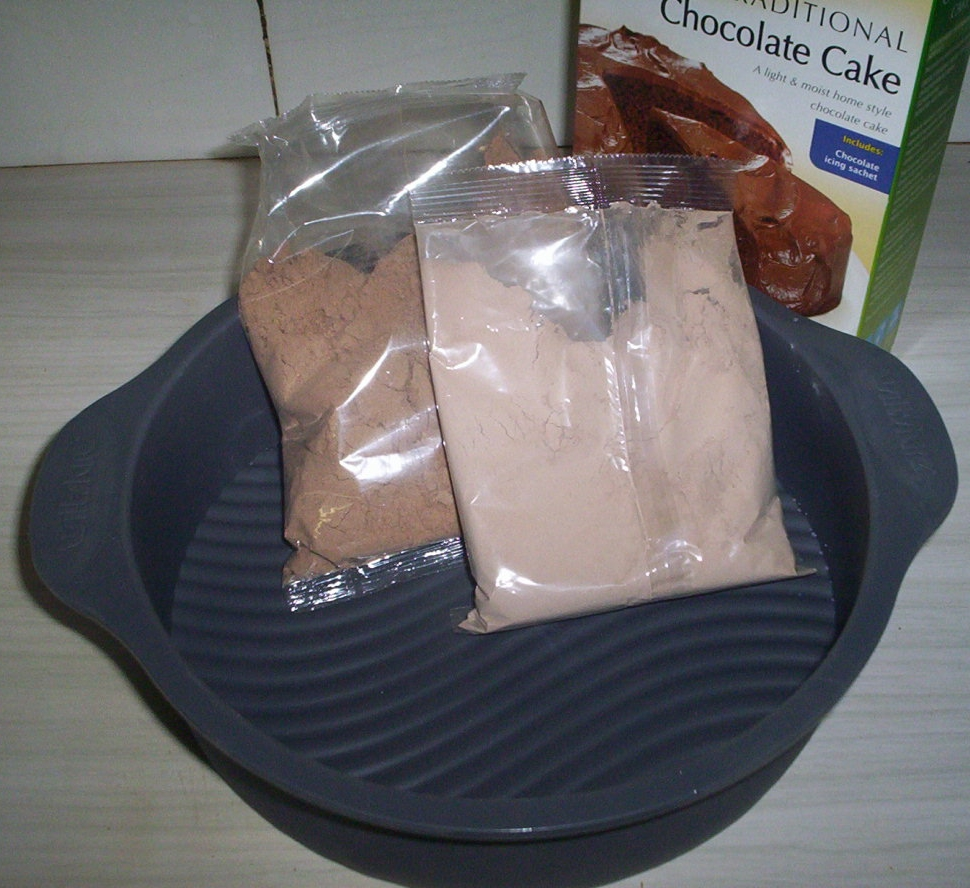
Bagged cake mix

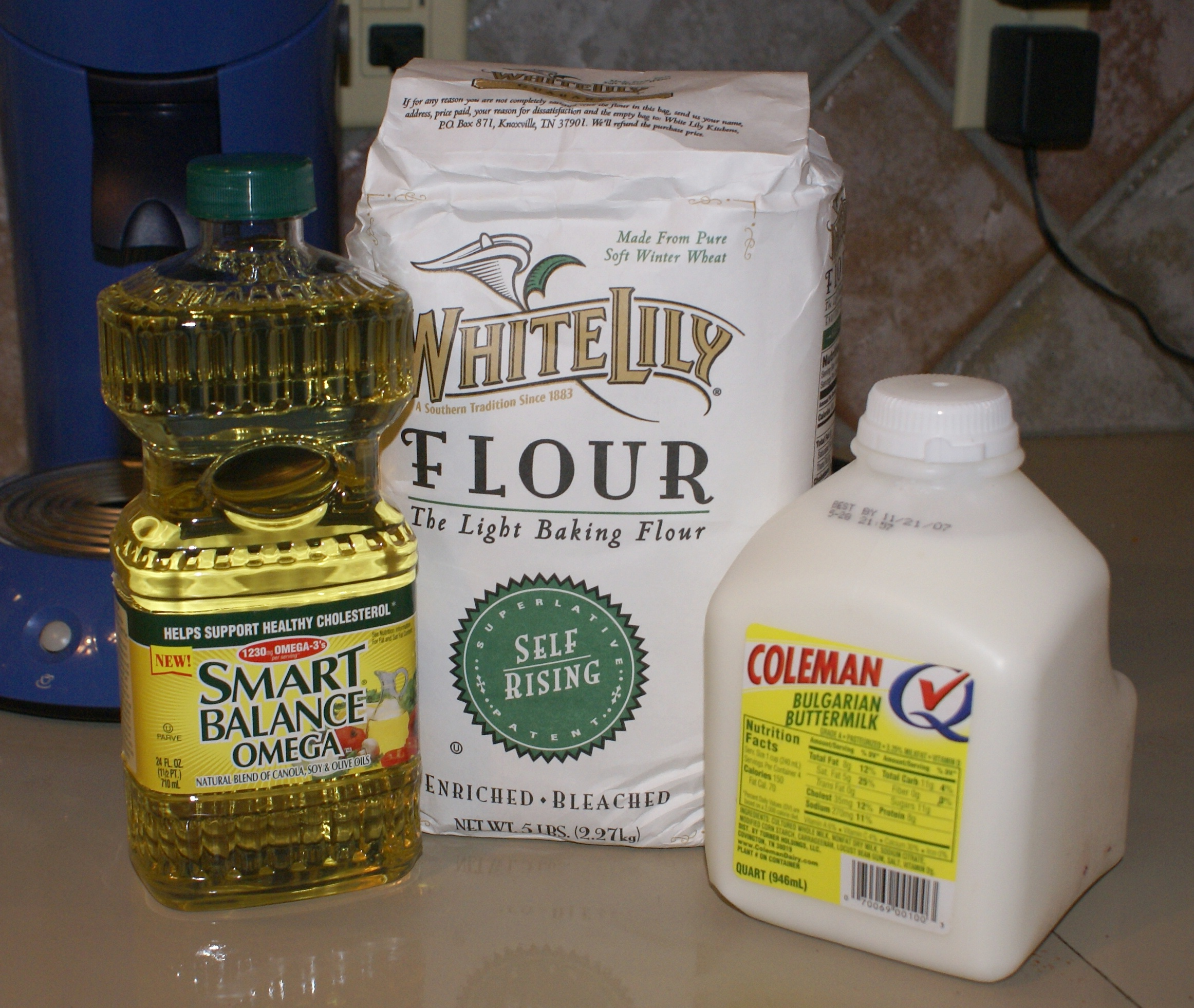
Biscuit components: plastic bottles, paper bag

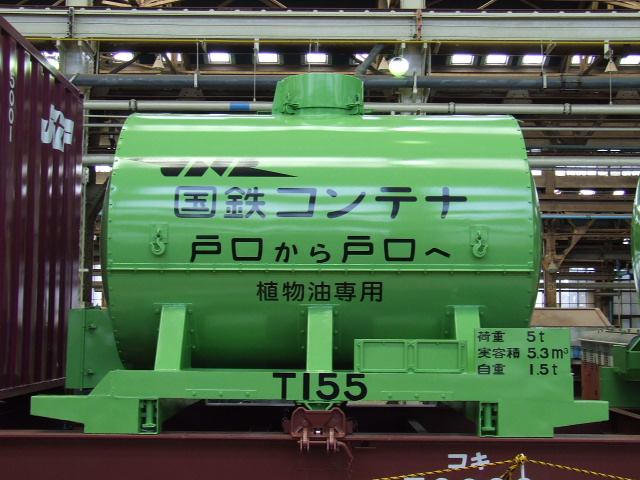
Container for bulk vegetable oil

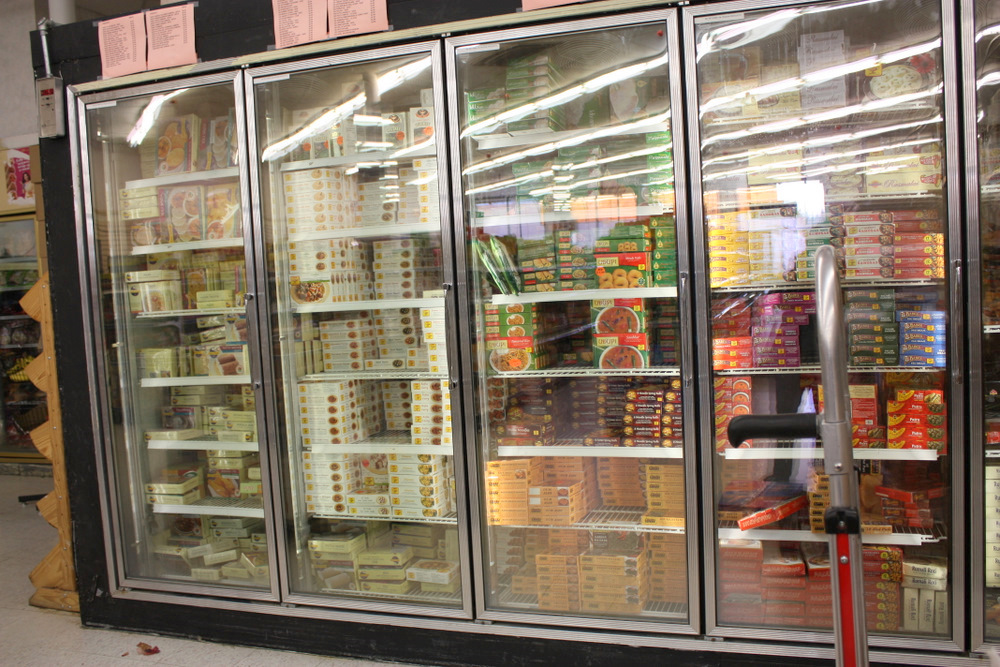
Frozen processed food freezer in supermarket

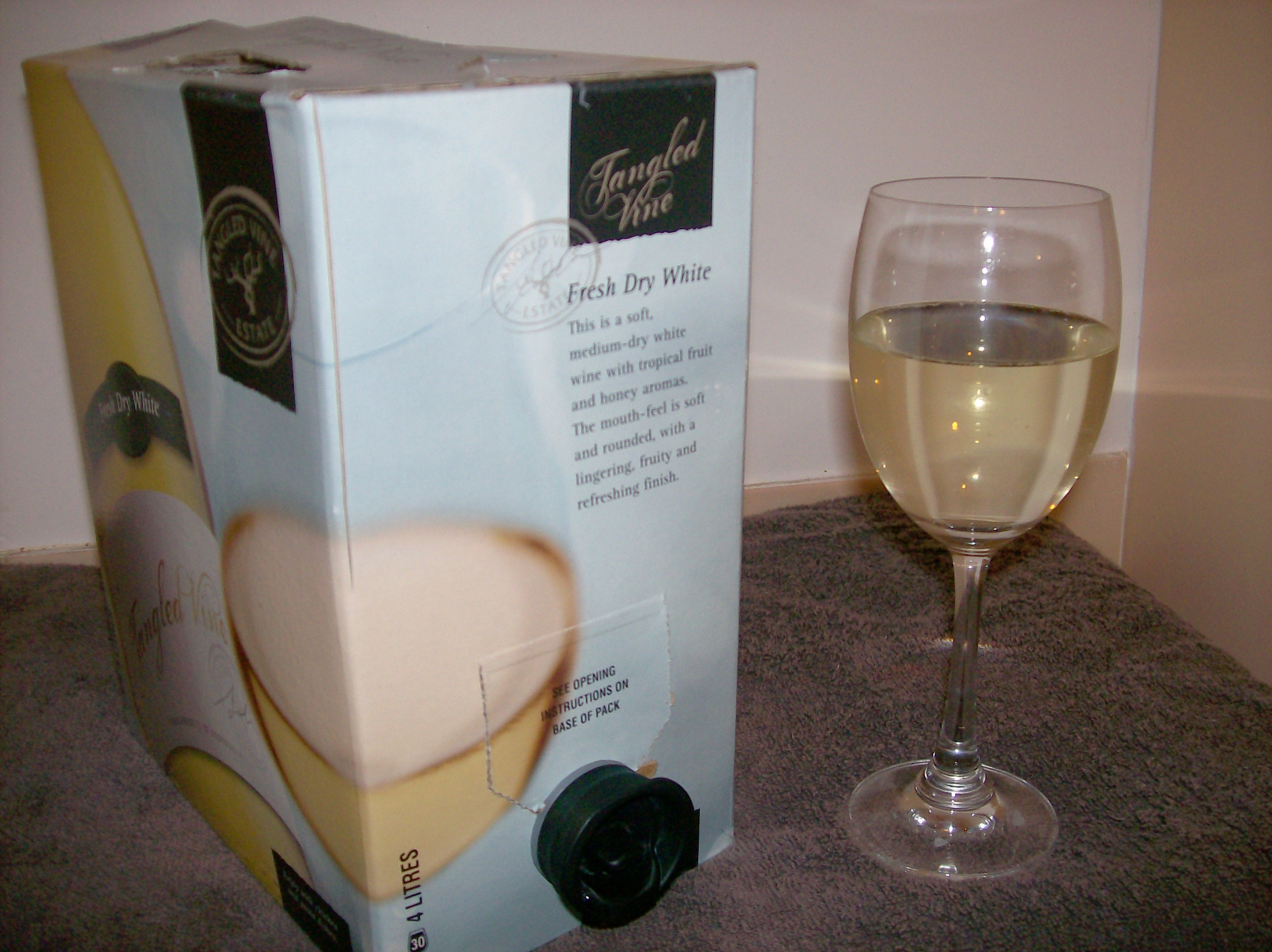
Bag in box; box wine

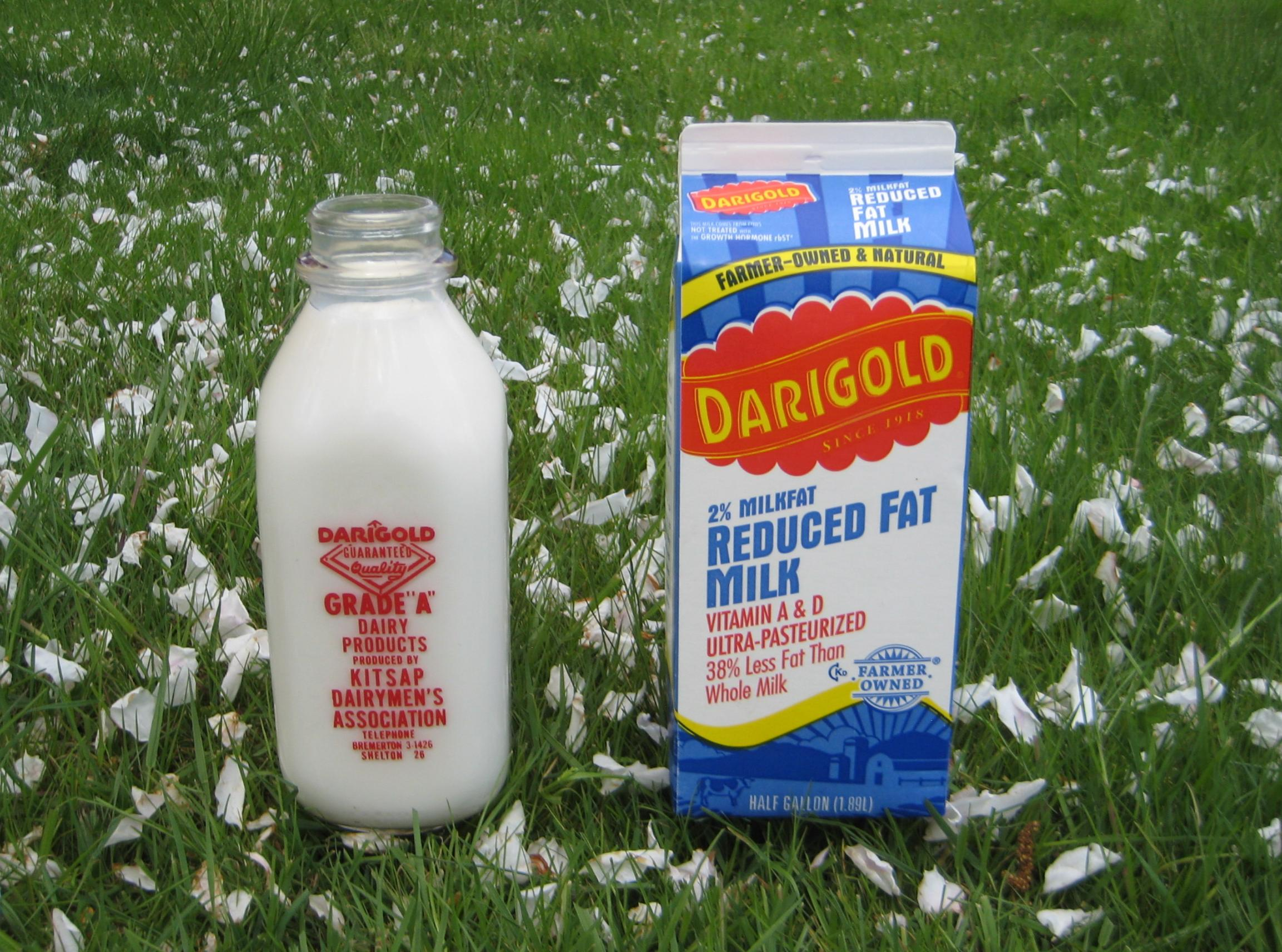
Glass milk bottle and paperboard milk carton

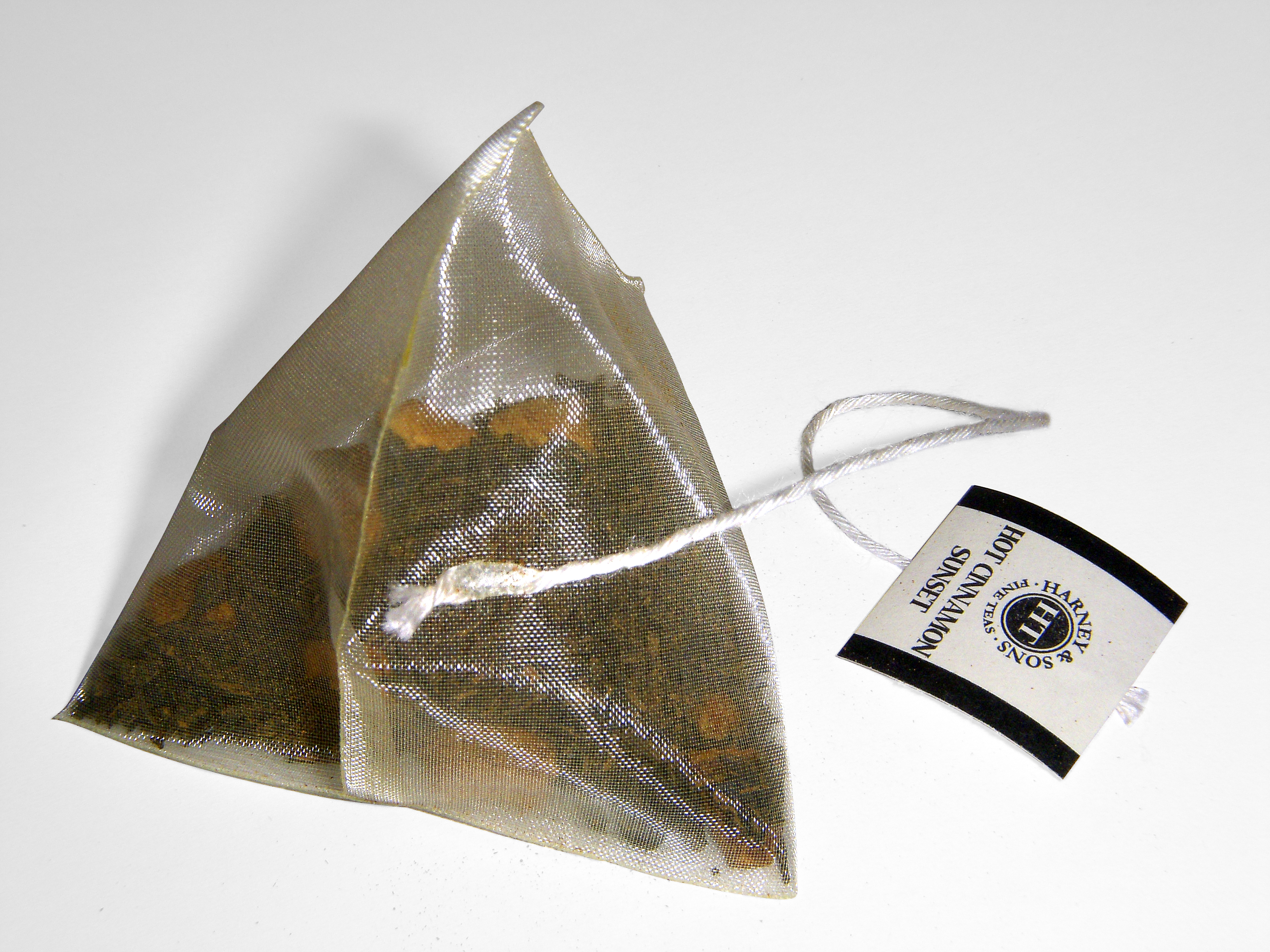
Silk tea bag

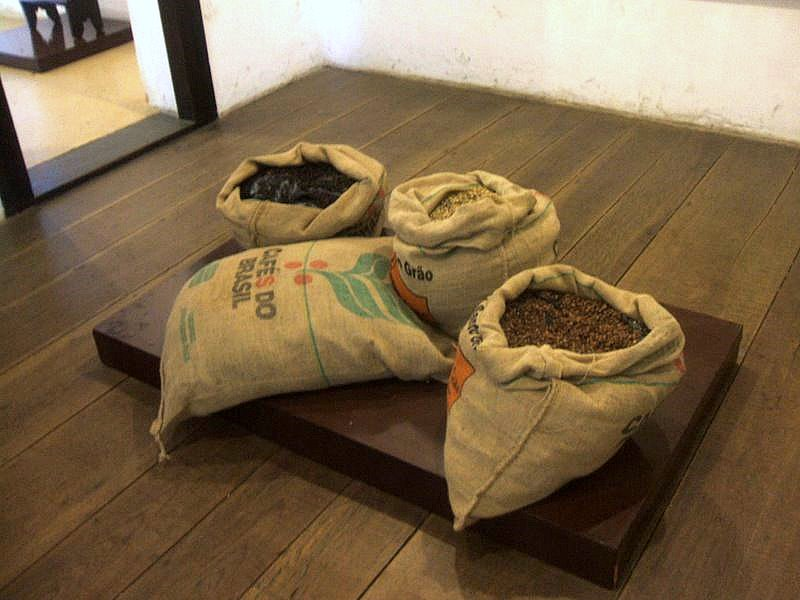
Coffee beans in burlap bags, gunny sacks

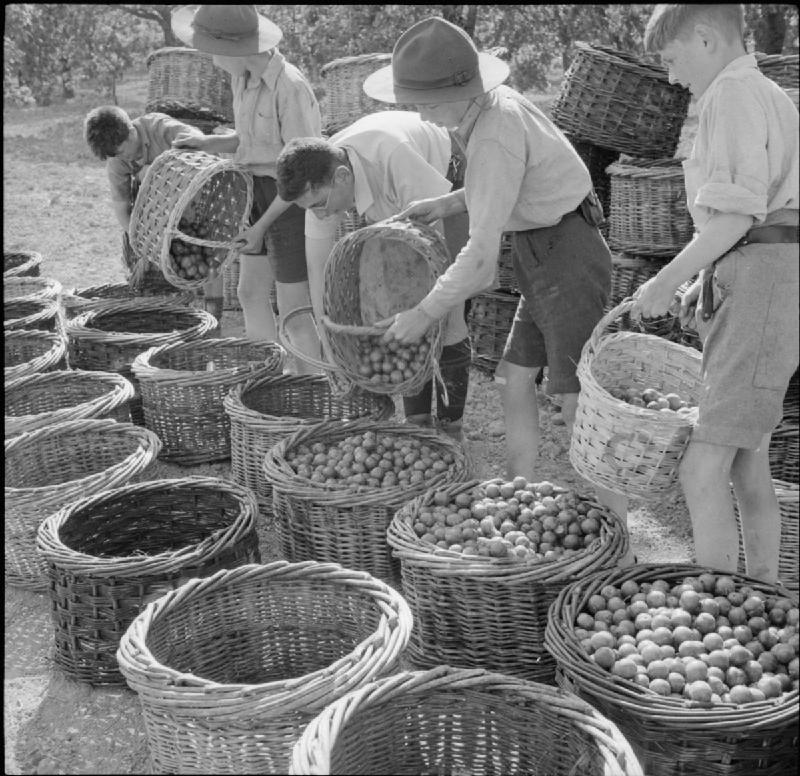
Bushel baskets of fruit

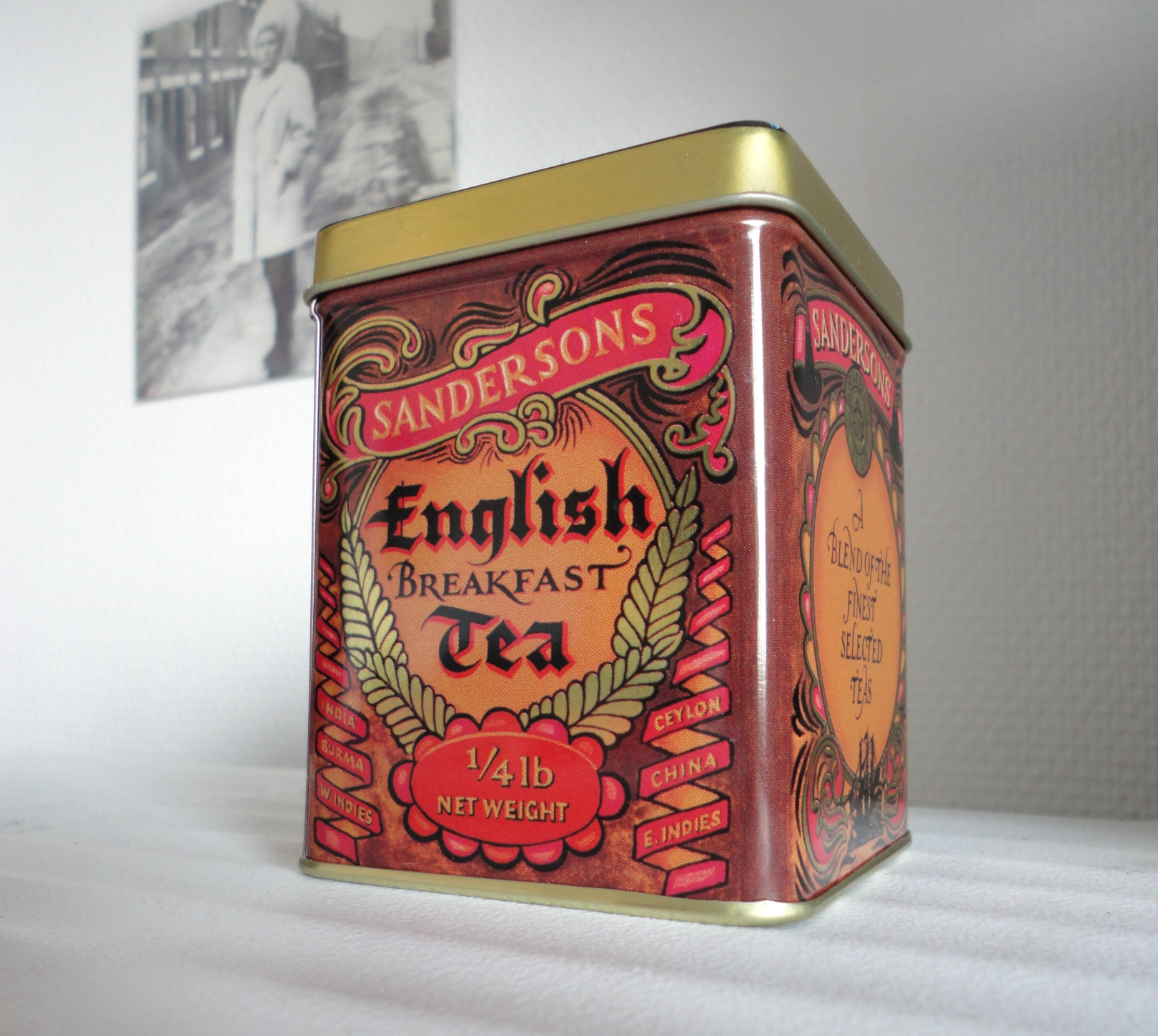
Tea tin, can with removable cover

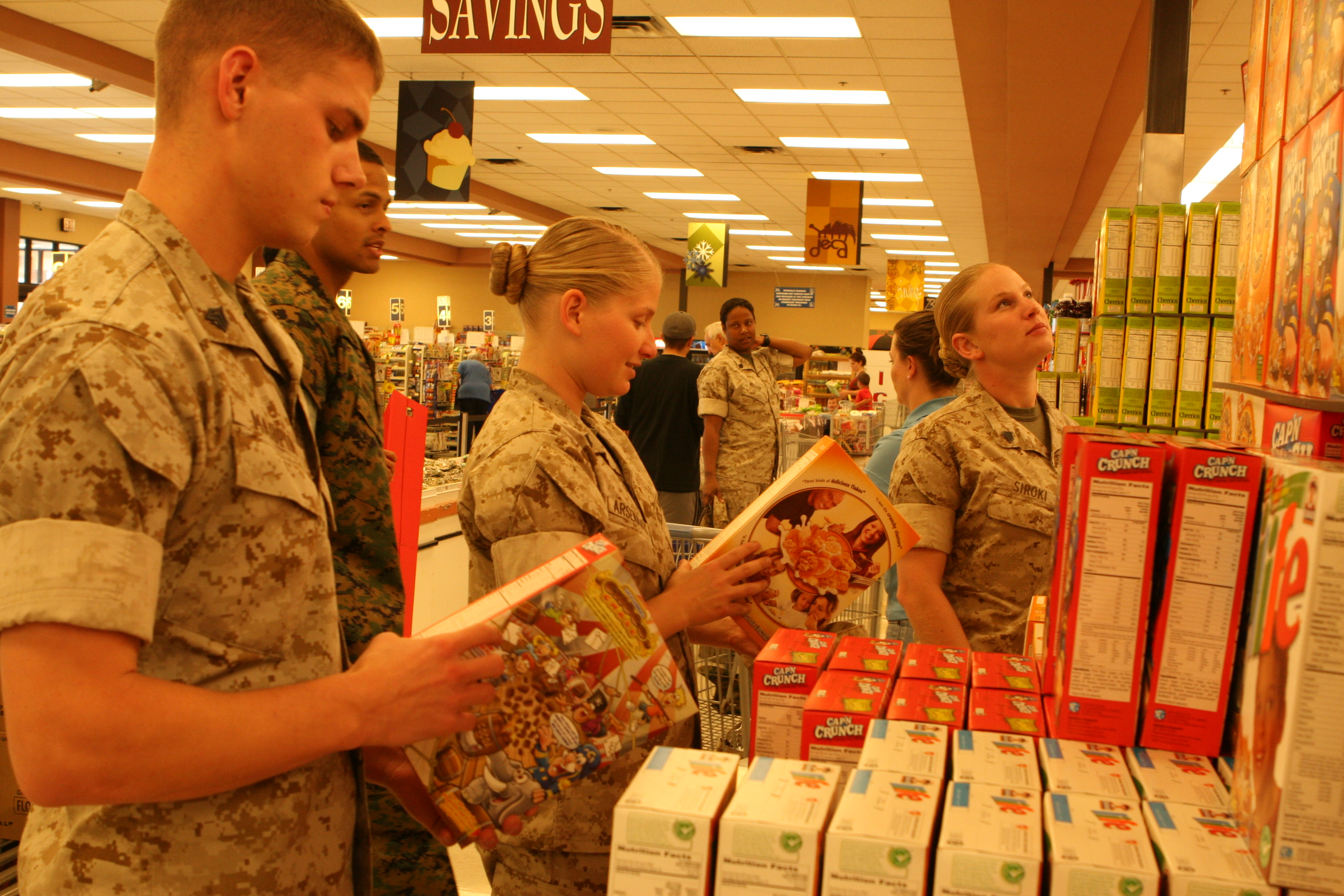
Folding cartons of cereal

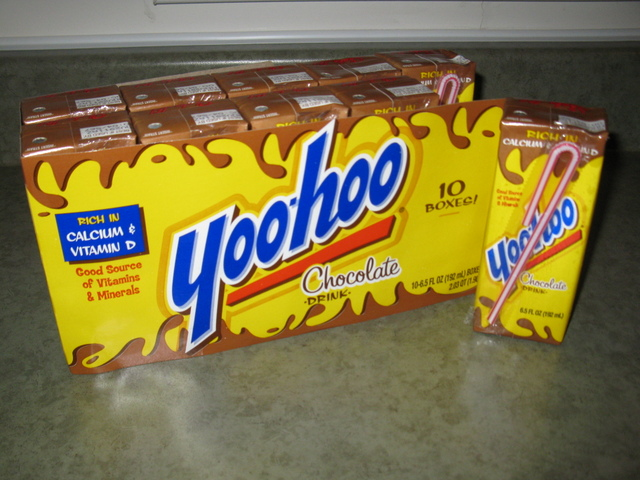
Drink boxes

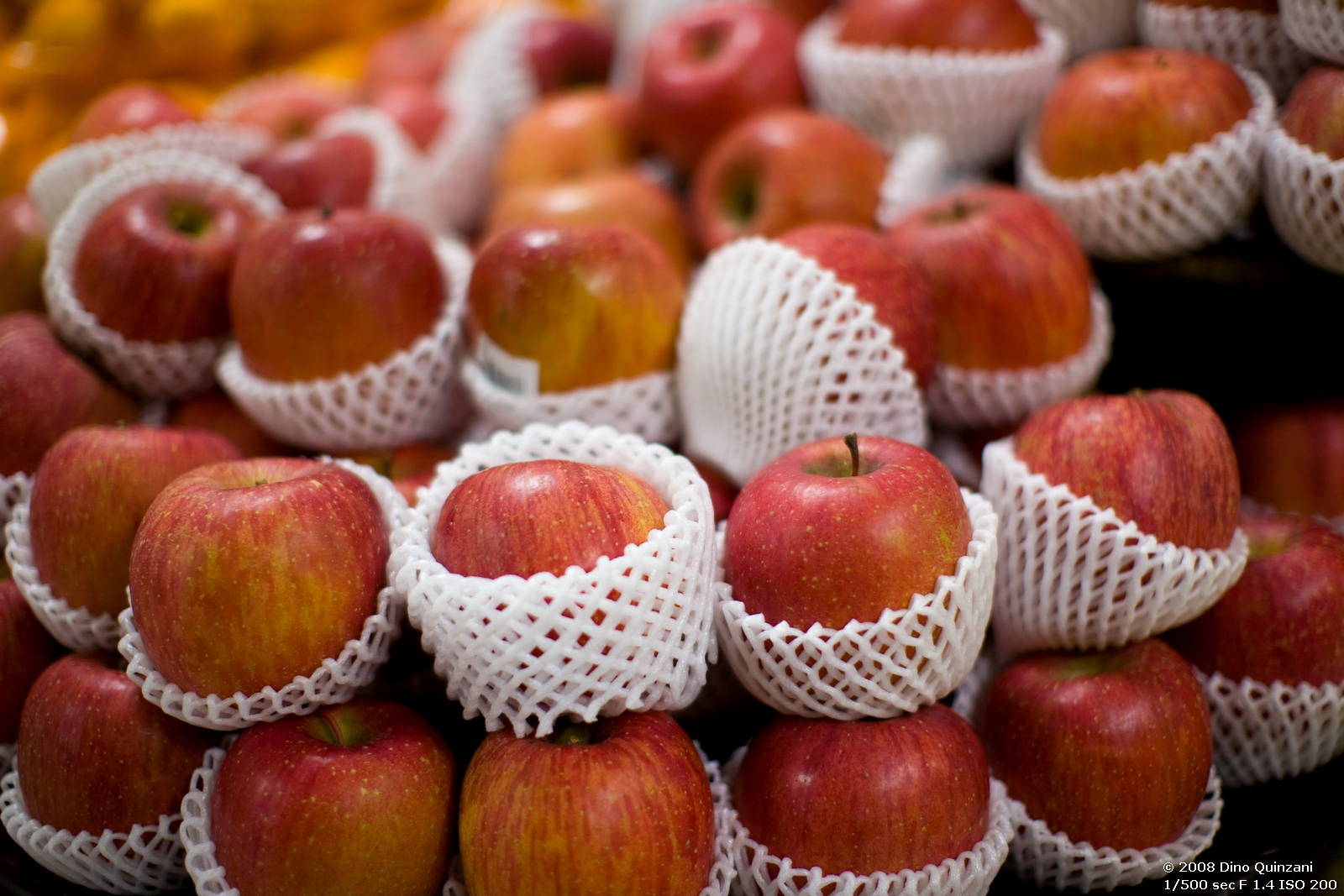
Packaged apples

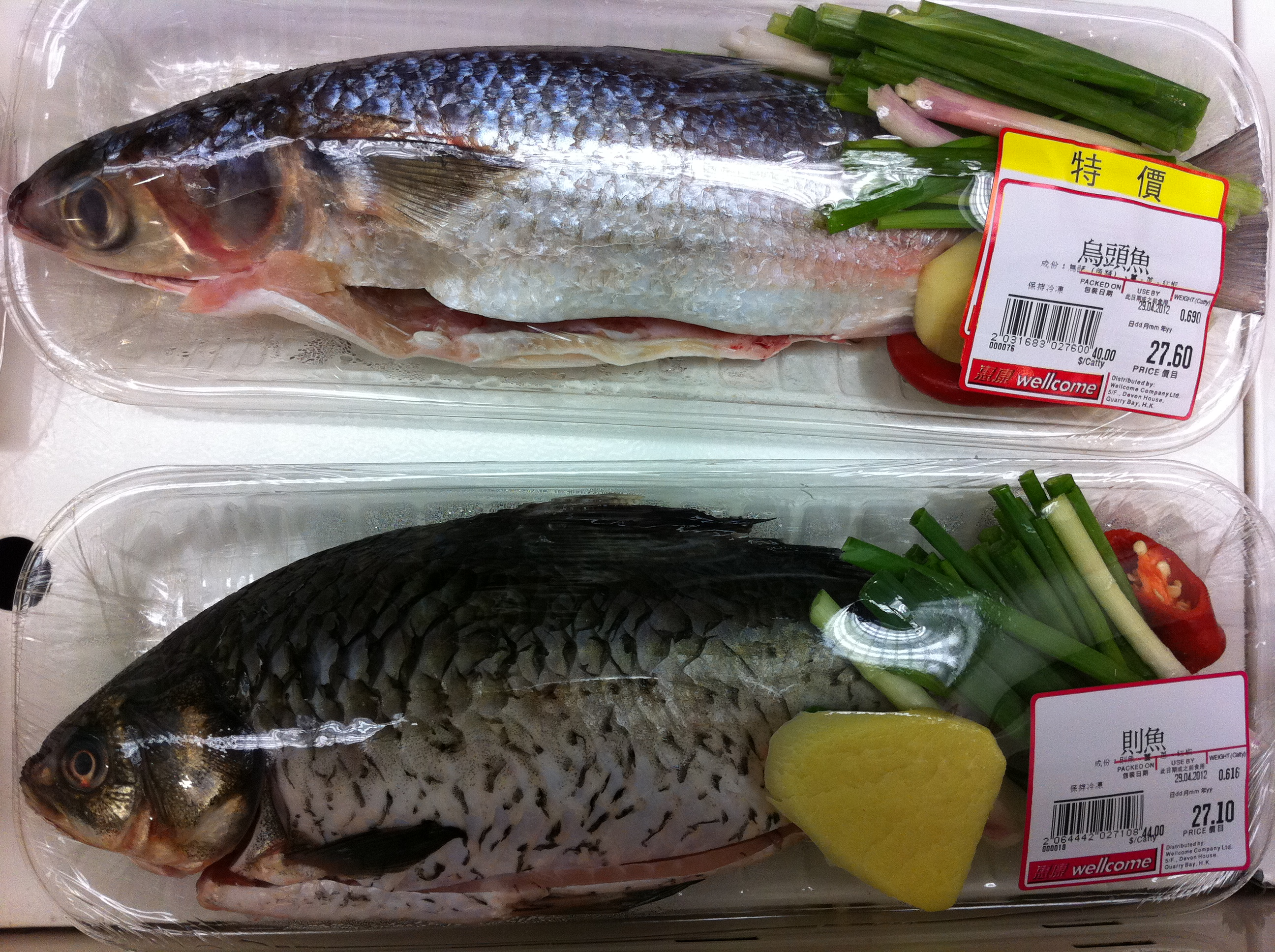
Fresh fish in plastic shrink-wrapped tray

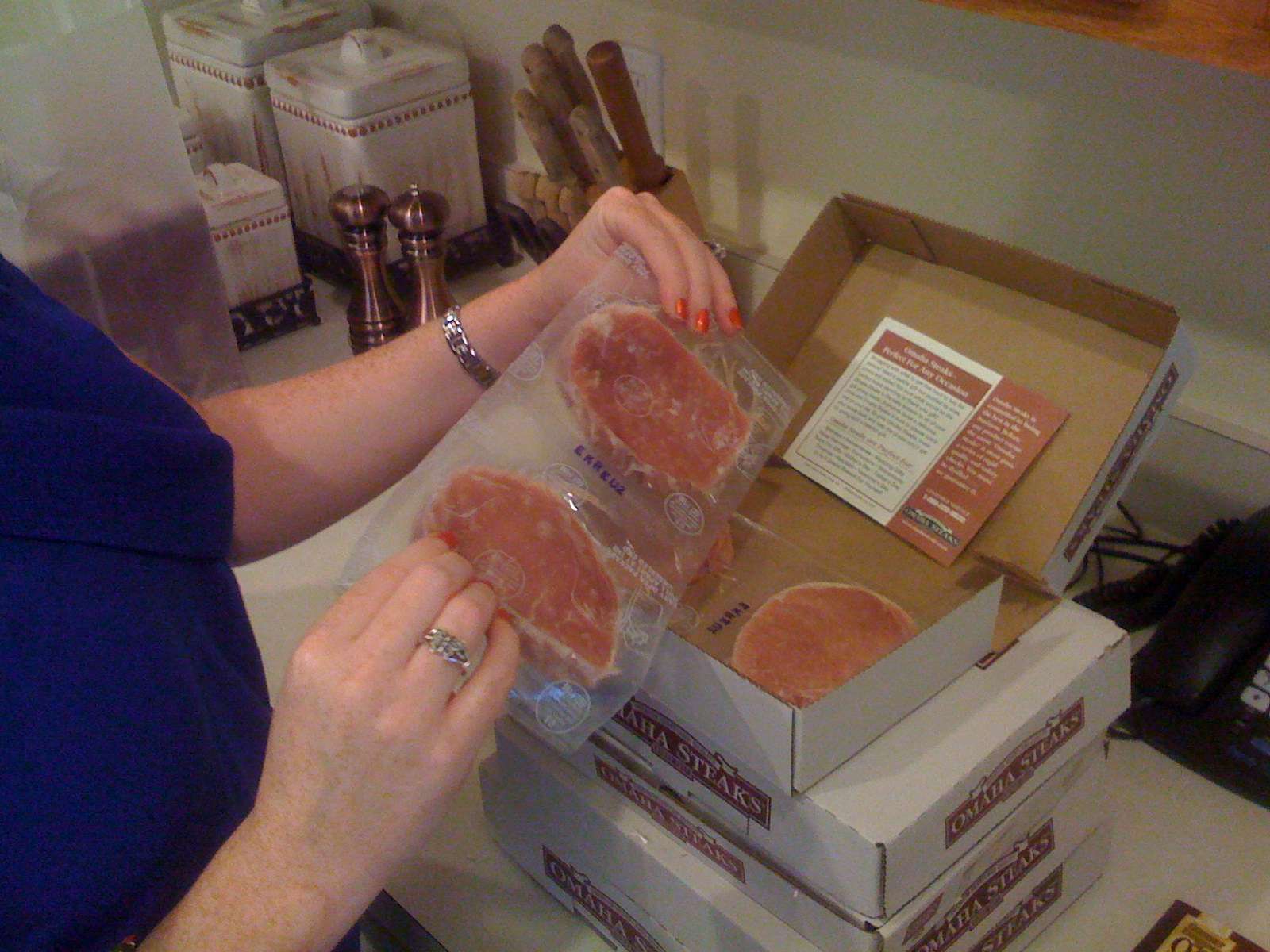
Shrink-wrapped frozen pork

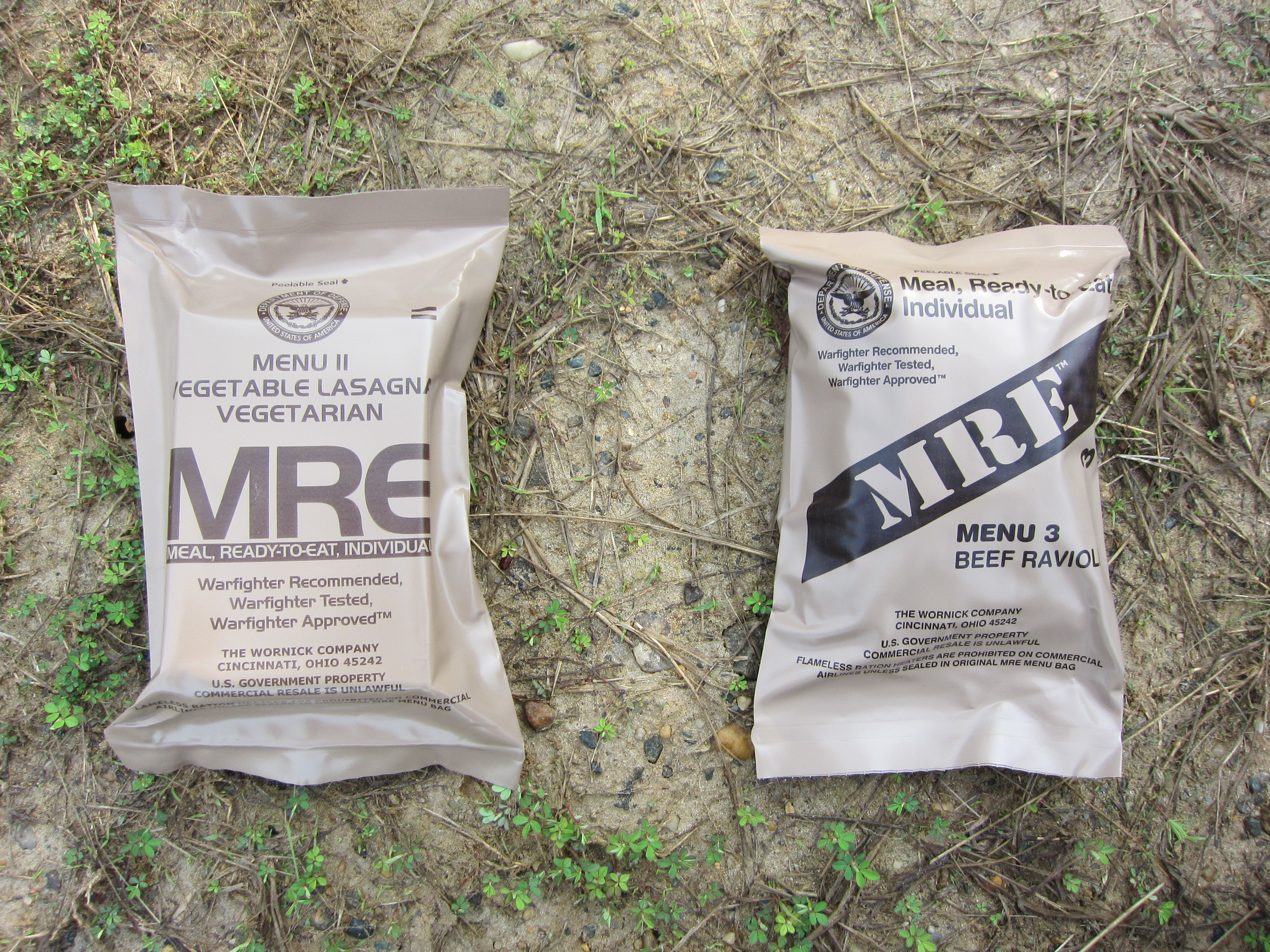
A pair of Meal, Ready-to-Eat (MRE) field rations packaged in retort pouches

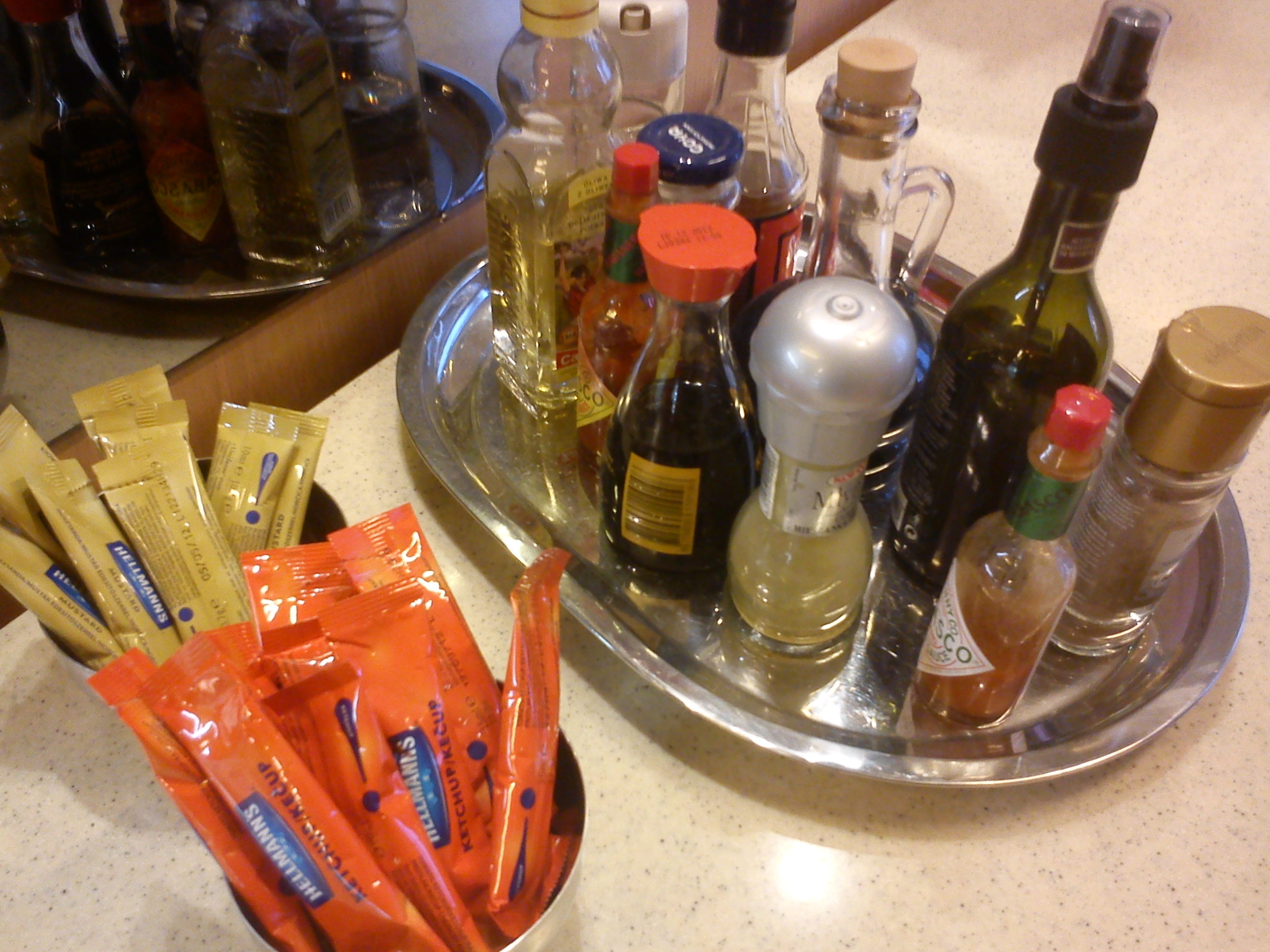
Condiments and spices

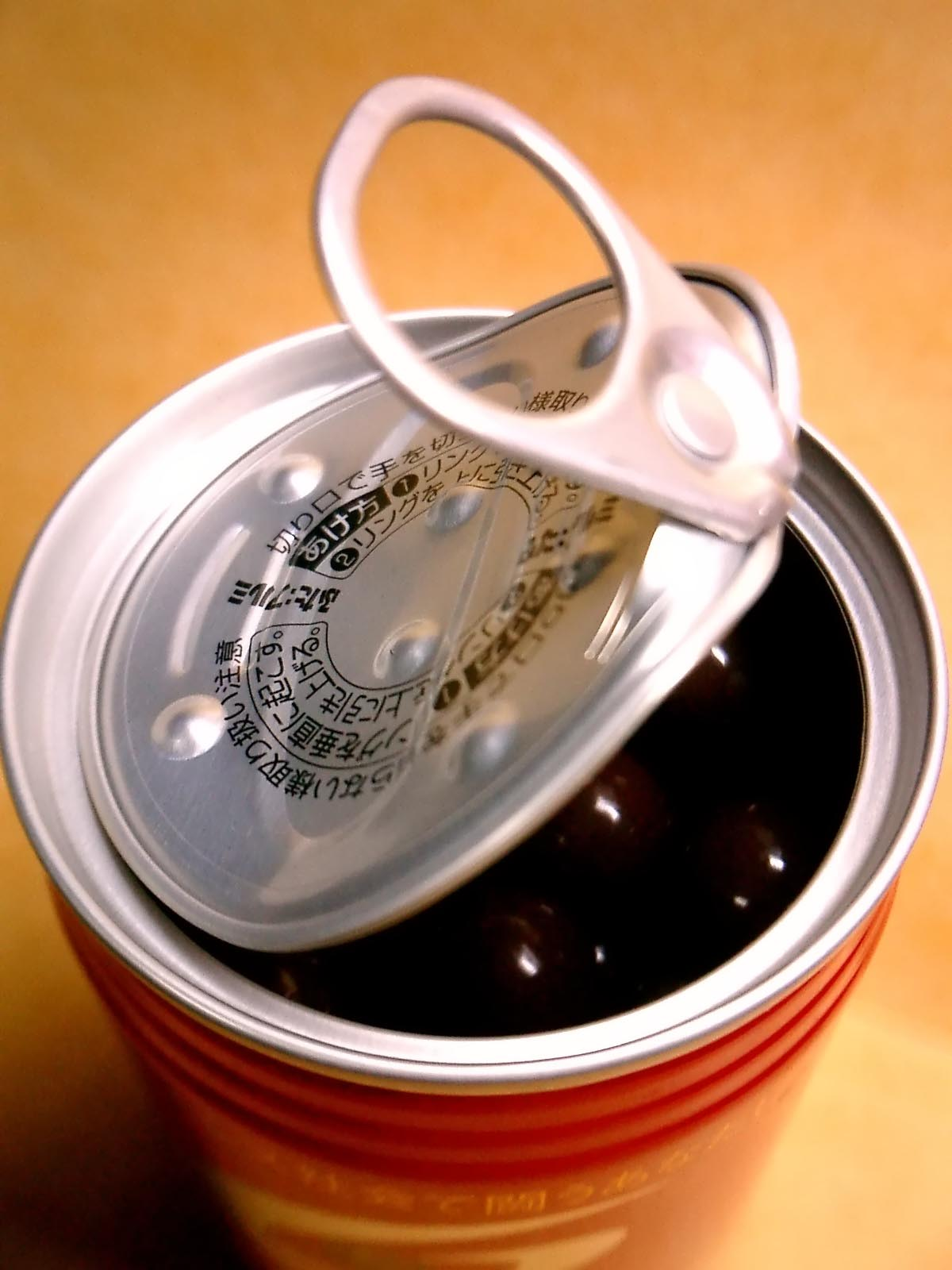
Steel can with an easy-open, full pull-out end

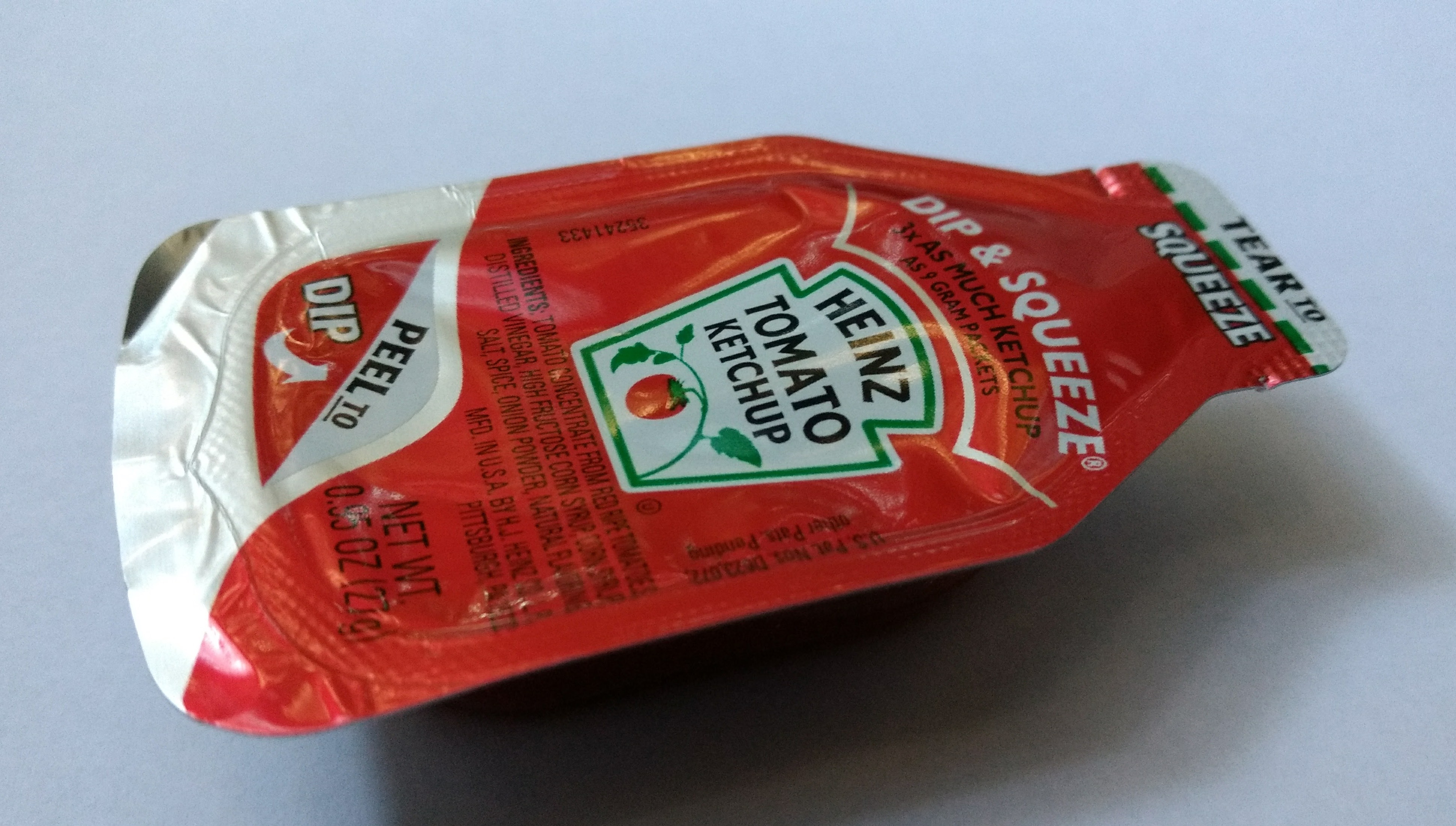
A Dip & Squeeze ketchup container

== Packaging machines ==
A choice of packaging machinery requires consideration of technical capabilities, labor requirements, worker safety, maintainability, serviceability, reliability, ability to integrate into the packaging line, capital cost, floorspace, flexibility (change-over, materials, etc.), energy usage, quality of outgoing packages, qualifications (for food, pharmaceuticals, etc.), throughput, efficiency, productivity, and ergonomics, at a minimum.

Packaging machines may be of the following general types:

- Autocoding label and date verification
- Blister, skin and vacuum packaging machines
- Capping, over-capping, lidding, closing, seaming and sealing machines
- Cartoning machines
- Case and tray forming, packing, unpacking, closing and sealing Machines
- Check weighing machines
- Cleaning, sterilizing, cooling and drying machines
- Conveying and accumulating machines
- Feeding, orienting, and placing machines
- Filling machines for liquid and powdered products
- Package filling and closing Machines
- Form, fill and seal machines
- Inspecting, detecting and checkweighing machines
- Palletizing, depalletizing, and pallet unitizing machines
- Labeling, marking, and other product identification machines
- Wrapping machines
- Converting machines
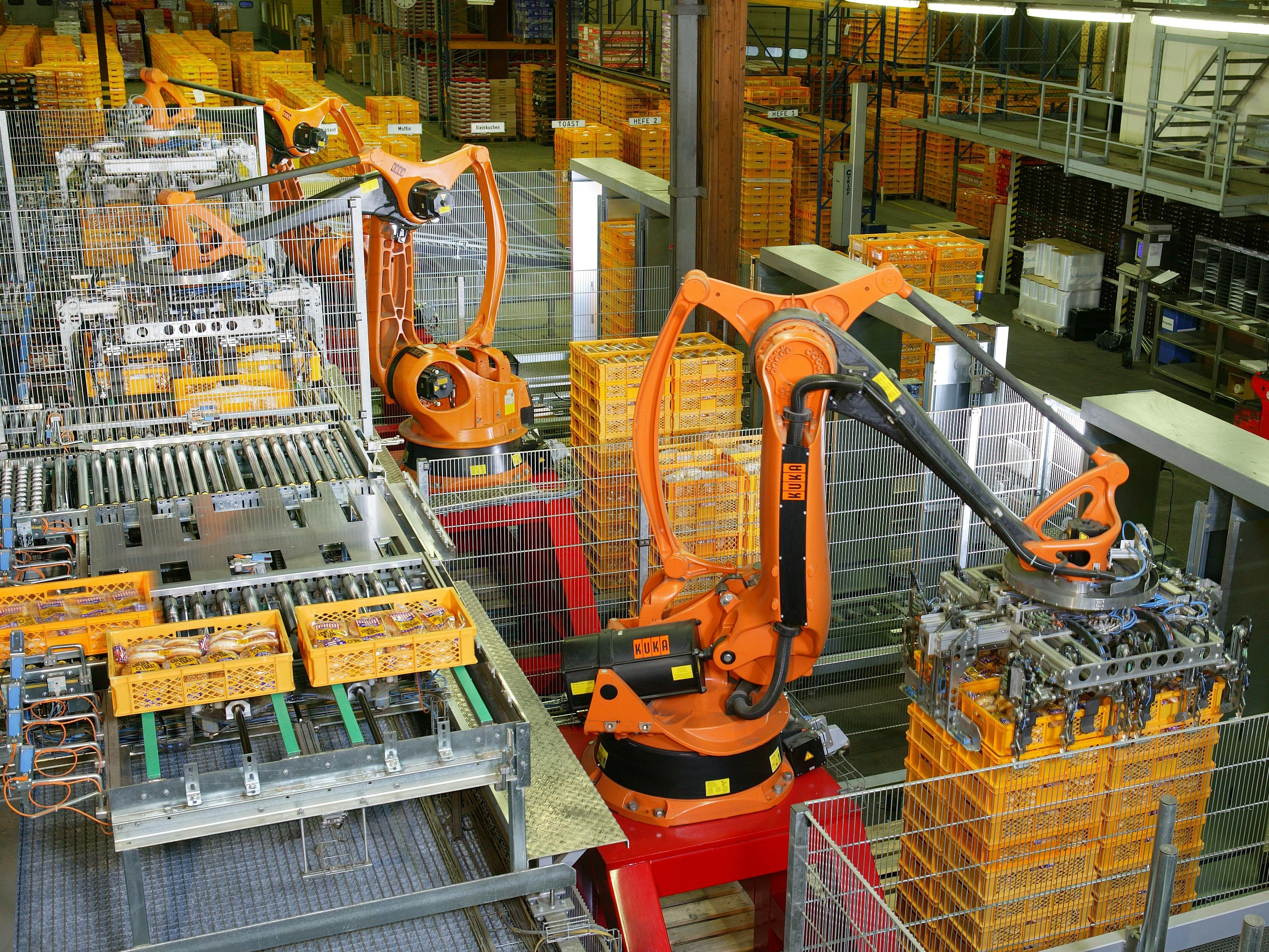
Automated palletizer of bread with industrial KUKA robots

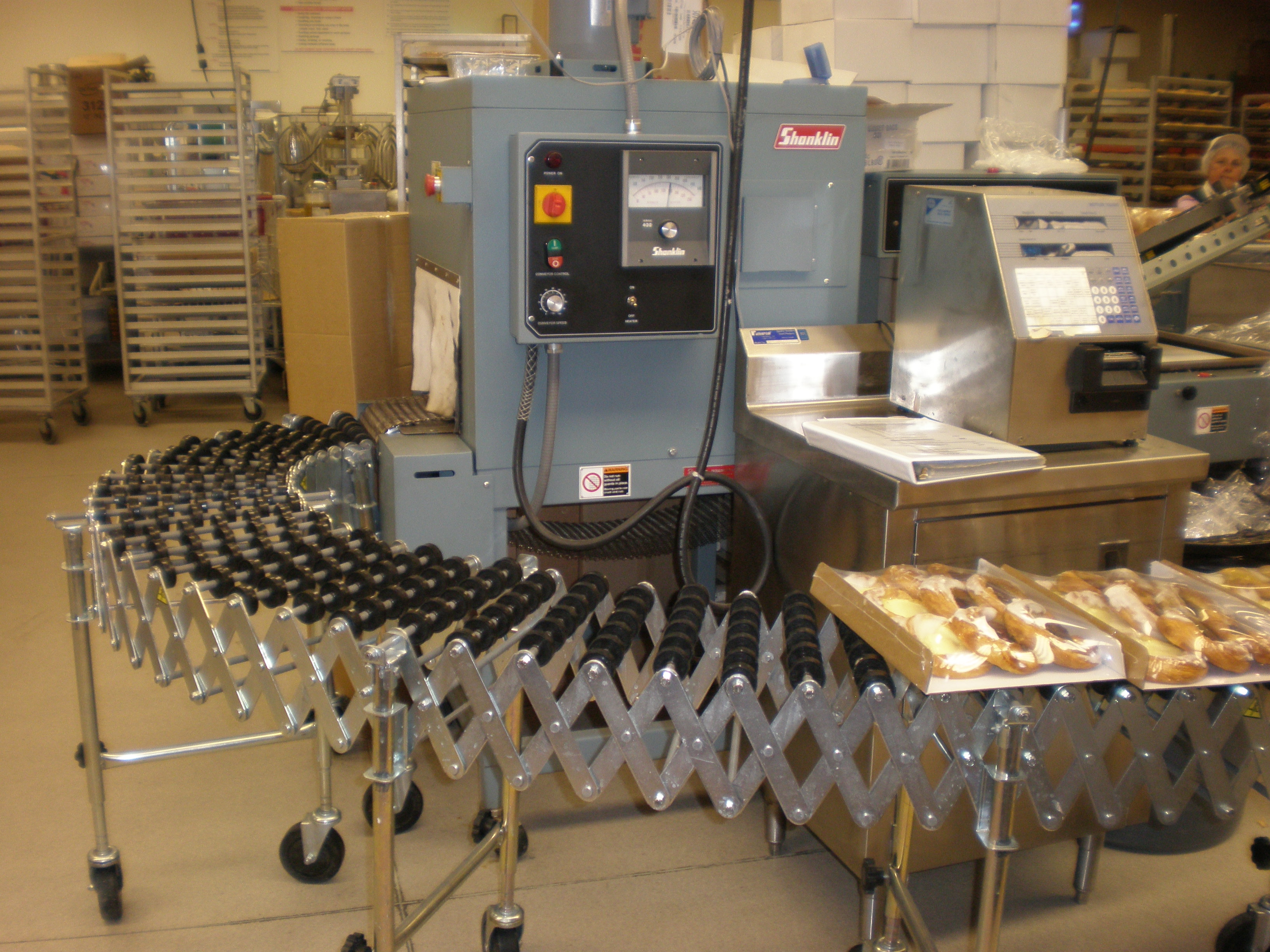
Shrink-wrapping trays of bakery goods

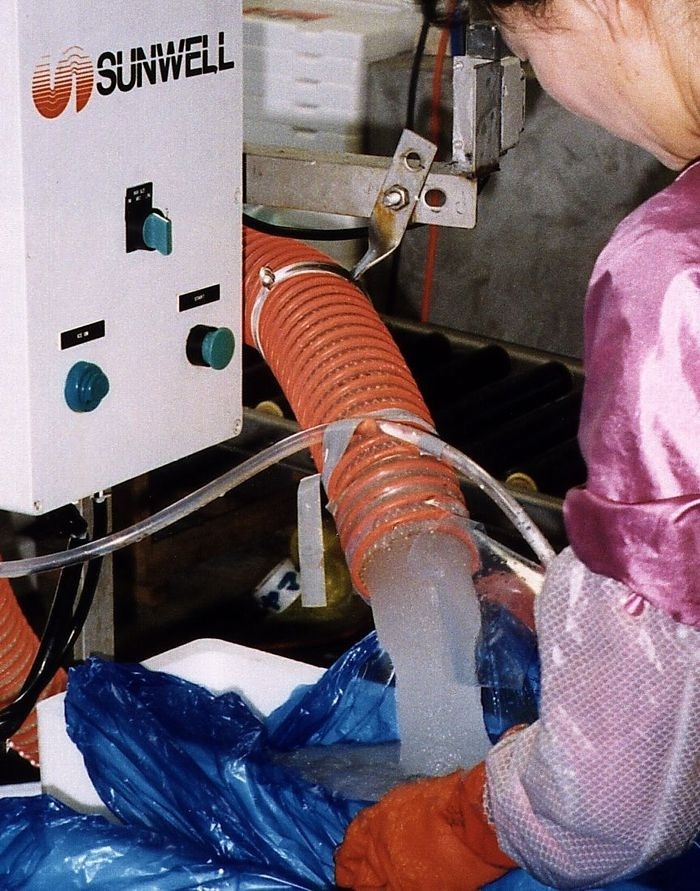
Pumping slurry ice onto fresh fish

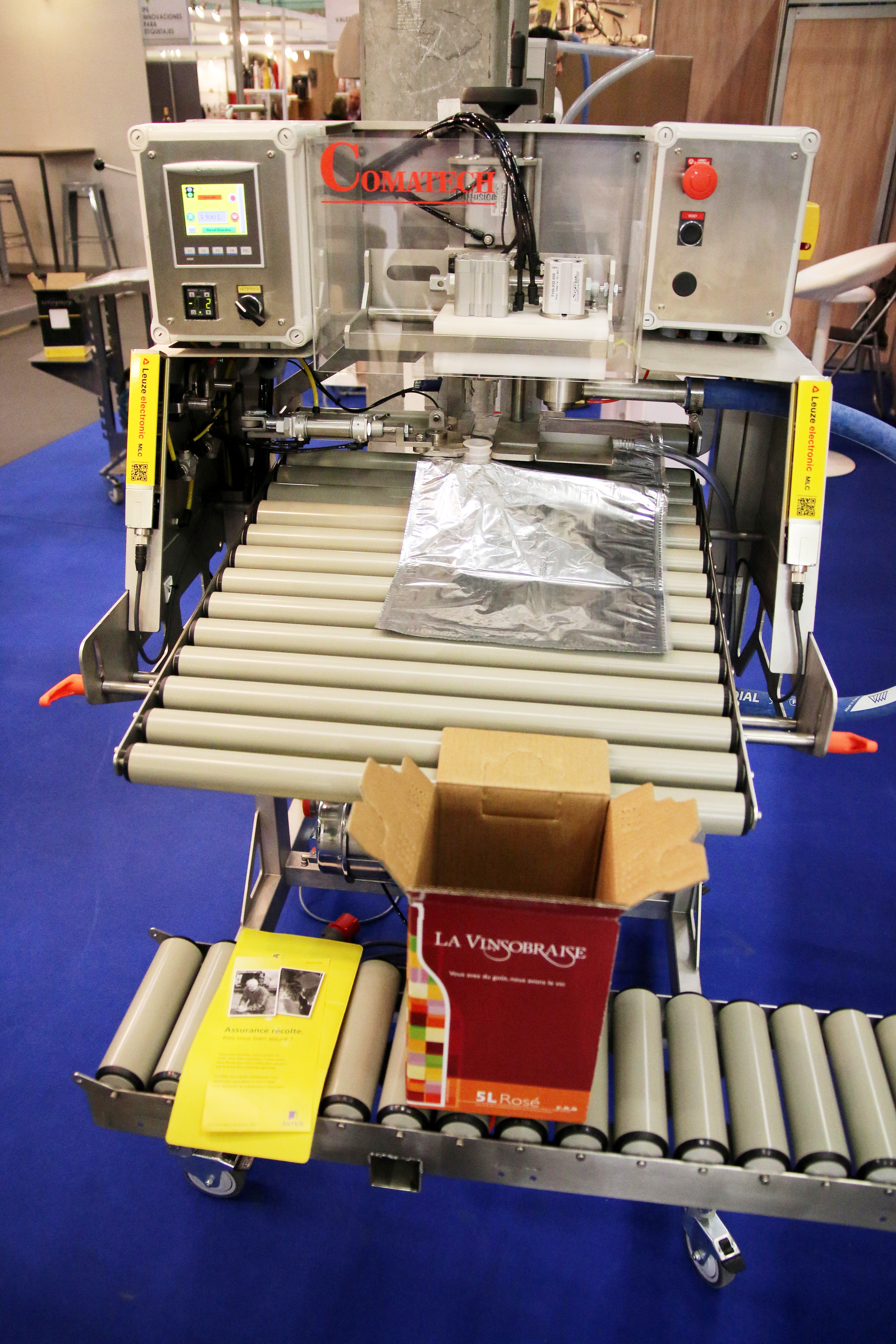
Filling machinery for bag-in-box

== Reduction of food packaging ==
Reduced packaging and sustainable packaging are becoming more frequent, although excessive overpackaging is still common. The motivations can be government regulations, consumer pressure, retailer pressure, and cost control. Reduced packaging often saves packaging costs. In the UK, a Local Government Association survey produced by the British Market Research Bureau compared a range of outlets to buy 29 common food items, and found that small, local retailers and market traders "produced less packaging and more that could be recycled than the larger supermarkets."

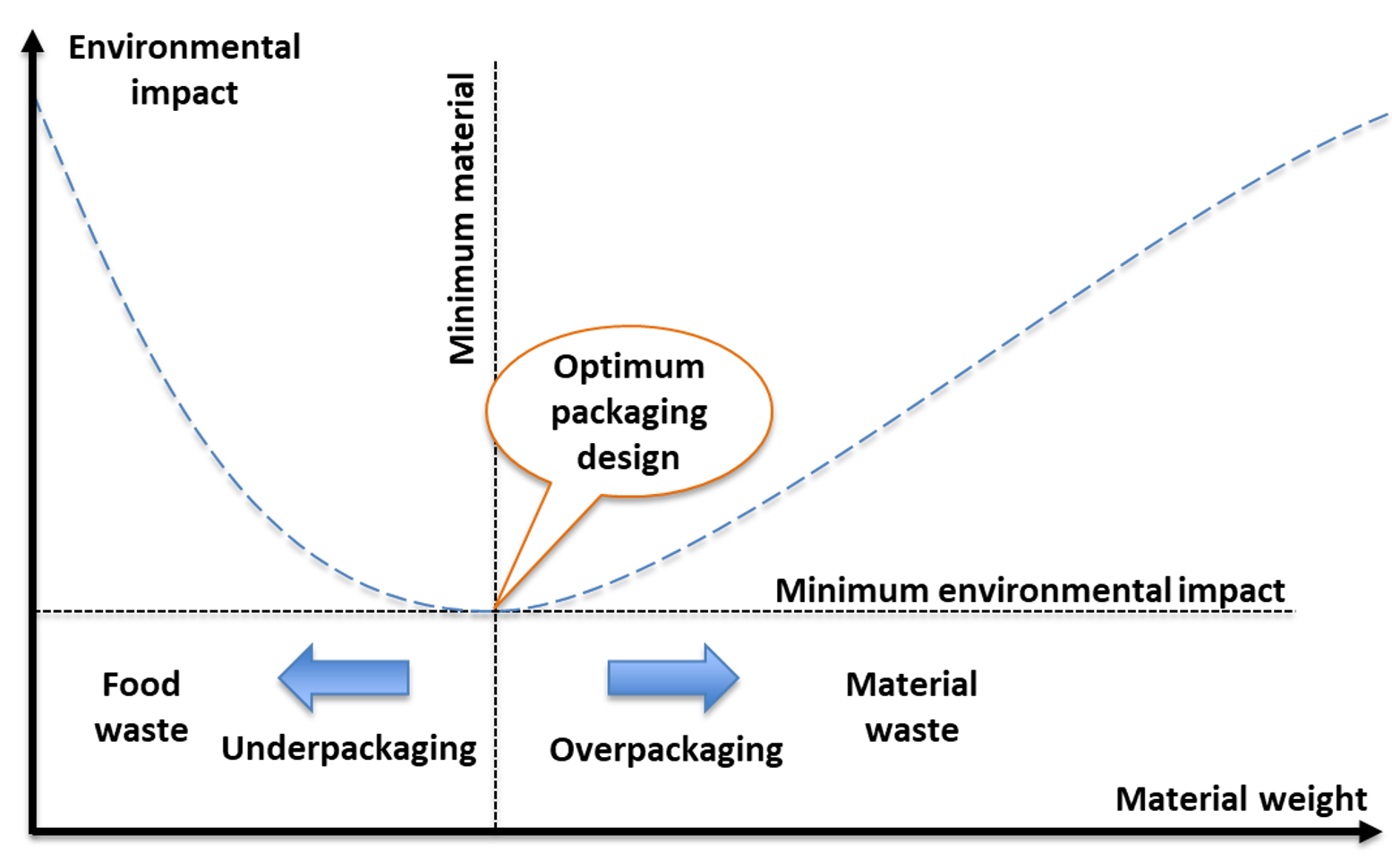
Optimum packaging design chart

In the last decades, the growing demand from the consumers and governments for more sustainable and eco-friendly packaging design has driven the food industry to redesign and propose alternative packaging solutions. However, in designing a brand new packaging system, several variables need to be taken in consideration. As shown in the optimum packaging design chart, an ideal packaging design should only use the right amount of the appropriate materials to provide the desired performance for a specific product.

Food packaging is often necessary, or even essential, for protecting food, keeping it safe, and thus preventing substantial food losses. However, food packaging today is strongly associated with both environmental risks and health risks for consumers. To help packaging professionals address this challenge, a Responsible food packaging platform (FitNESS Food Packaging) was created in 2017 by 11 European partners, to provide both general and in-depth training courses on the design of responsible food packaging. Developed with funding from the European Union Erasmus+ programme, this platform includes learning to optimise many sometimes contradictory criteria across all aspects of food packaging, from its production and use, through to its reuse, recycling, and disposal.

== End-of-use ==
- Plastic: Landfilling, burning, and recycling are all alternatives for plastic packaging at the end of their shelf-life. However, improper disposal and handling lead to higher percentages of plastic waste, which can pollute the environment in a wide spectrum of scenarios. The packaging sector accounts for 40.5% of all plastic produced in Europe, which represents the largest sector in food industry. However, the recycling of such wastege is at a critical low level of roughly 35%. Moreover, it has been estimated that over 20% of the plastic packaging does not reach any recycling process.
- Bioplastic: also known as biodegradable polymer or biopolymer, are usually made from renewable feedstock resources like corn, potatoes, wood pulp and sugarcane, as well as from renewable natural resources of different kind. Typical end-of-life options include the composting or the environmental degradation of bioplastics, which result in resource loss and CO_{2} production. Complete degradation is also only achievable under rigorous conditions that are infrequently offered by the company. Additionally, some bioplastics are processed similarly to their traditional, fossil-based counterparts, which, if improperly sorted, might cause harmful interferences in other materials' recycling processes.
- Paper, paperboard, and corrugated board: are composed of cellulosic fibers bonded together to form a flexible structure. These packaging materials have a long tradition as the ideal solutions for storing dry foods (such as flour, rice, and pasta) as well as being used as secondary or tertiary packaging. Paper and cardboard are often collected separately for recycling; however, some difficulties are faced in the case of the presence of a coating (e.g., plastic or aluminium) or contamination due to food residues. Alternative end-of-life options include incineration and landfill. In theory, paper and board packaging is compostable, but persistent chemicals (like PFAS) may be dispersed in the environment through this practice, thus limiting the potential benefits.
- Metal-based packaging can endure high temperatures and can provide outstanding gas, light, and aroma barriers, leading to a very competitive solution in a broad range of applications. Direct food preservation in the packaging was made possible with the development of the canning method. Coatings, whether organic or inorganic, may lessen the interactions between metal and food. However, it was discovered that many of the chemicals in these coatings migrated into food. The end-of-life alternatives for metal food packaging differ depending on its usage: for example, cans and lids can be broken down and recycled multiple times.
- Glass: is an inorganic packaging that has been used for storing food and beverages. Nowadays, soda-lime glass is the commonly used variation, manufactured from raw materials such as soda ash, limestone, and metal. Due to the structural characteristics of glass, the risk of migration into the food is very limited. Glass is incredibly chemically stable and durable, when handled carefully (due to its fragile nature). Therefore, this packaging material is an ideal candidate for repeated use, due to these characteristics. Glass can also be recycled multiple times without losing any quality properties.
- Multi-layer packaging: in the food and beverage business, packaging composed of numerous layers of various materials is commonly referred to as multi-layer or multi-material packaging. In many countries, multi-material food packaging is frequently burned or disposed of in landfills. Nevertheless, some areas are actively developing separate collections and efficient sorting processes for fiber-based multi-material packaging, such as beverage cartons. On the other hand, multi-layer packaging composed of aluminum and plastic barrier, cannot currently be recycled in an efficient way, and must undergo chemical treatment to be disposed of correctly. In light of these considerations, it is clear how, despite being the state-of-the-art in food packaging applications, multi-layer packaging poses a great challenge when considering its end-of-life. An exception is the case of multi-layer packaging consisting of several layers of the same material (or being part of the same category): such solutions in many cases allow for outstanding performance and, at the same time, allow for an easier recycling.

=== Recycling of food packaging ===
Food packaging is created through the use of a wide variety of plastics and metals, papers, and glass materials. Recycling these products differs from the act of literally reusing them because the recycling process has its own algorithm, which includes collecting, sourcing, processing, manufacturing and marketing these products. According to the Environmental Protection Agency of the United States, the recycling rate has been steadily on the rise, with data reporting that, in 2018, the recycling rate of generated packaging and containers was 53.9 percent.

Recycling rates for glass and metal packaging fluctuate considerably based on regional infrastructure, collection methods, and public engagement. In the European Union, glass packaging attains an average recycling rate of approximately 80%. Conversely, the United States exhibits a lower glass recycling rate of roughly 31%, mainly due to contamination and inadequate sorting capabilities. Metal packaging, especially aluminum and steel, typically has superior recycling efficiency. In the EU, aluminum beverage cans achieve recycling rates of approximately 76%. Both materials exhibit superior recycling rates and quality in comparison to plastic and paper.

The product's quality and safety are the package's most important responsibility. However, there have been growing demands for packaging to be designed, manufactured, consumed, and recycled in a more sustainable fashion due to the increasing pollution connected with packaging and food waste. It has been estimated that only 10.33% of all municipal solid waste (MSW), which makes up to 30.3% of the total waste, is recycled into new products globally.

However, depending on the level of packaging and the materials that are being used during their manufacturing, the end-of-life of a package may differ completely. Despite the fact that a recycling process is usually the desired path, lots of complications may lead to less sustainable destines.

== Trends in food packaging ==
- Numerous reports made by industry associations agree that use of smart indicators will increase. There are a number of different indicators, with different benefits for food producers, consumers and retailers.
- Temperature recorders are used to monitor products shipped in a cold chain and to help validate the cold chain. Digital temperature data loggers measure and record the temperature history of food shipments. They sometimes have temperatures displayed on the indicator, or have other outputs (lights, etc.): the data from a shipment can be downloaded (cable, RFID, etc.) to a computer for further analysis. These help identify if there has been temperature abuse of products and can help determine the remaining shelf life. They can also help determine the time of temperature extremes during shipment, so that corrective measures can be taken.
- Time temperature indicators integrate the time and temperature experienced by the indicator and adjacent foods. Some use chemical reactions that result in a color change, while others use the migration of a dye through a filter media. To the degree that these physical changes in the indicator match the degradation rate of the food, the indicator can help indicate probable food degradation.
- Radio frequency identification is applied to food packages for supply chain control. It has shown a significant benefit in allowing food producers and retailers to have full real time visibility of their supply chain.
- Plastic packaging being used is usually non-biodegradable due to possible interactions with the food. Also, biodegradable polymers often require special composting conditions to properly degrade. Normal sealed landfill conditions do not promote biodegradation. Biodegradable plastics include biodegradable films and coatings synthesized from organic materials and microbial polymers. Some package materials are edible. For example, pharmaceuticals are sometimes in capsules made of gelatin, starch, potato, or other materials. Newer bioplastics, films and products are being developed.
- There is an increasing development and production of food packaging materials containing substances and realizing systems intended to extend shelf life: carbon dioxide (CO_{2}) emitters; antioxidants (e.g. butylated hydroxytoluene (BHT), butylated hydroxyanisole (BHA), tocopherols, hinokitiol); antimicrobial enzymes (e.g. lysozyme), polymers (e.g. ε-polylysine, chitosan) and nanoparticles (e.g. silver, copper, gold, platinum, titanium dioxide, zinc oxide, magnesium oxide, organically modified nanoclays); bacteriocins (e.g. nisin, natamycin); and essential oils.
- In the last decades, the use of modified atmosphere packaging (MAP) and other variation of this technology has shown growing interest and application in the food packaging industry. The use of a specific gas mixture inside the packaging headspace has proven to be ideal to slow down the metabolic process of food products, thus prolonging the shelf-life of meat, fish, fruits and vegetables.
- The design of multi-layer packaging system has been recognized as the state-of-the-art in food packaging application for its versatility, processability and efficacy. Each layer can be made of different materials and provides a key functionality for the whole structure, such as improved mechanical properties, chemical stability, barrier properties and anti-microbial properties. However, the use of such complex structures significantly reduces its recyclability (except for a few cases).
- Recently, the application of protective coating on commercially available packaging materials (such as PET, PP, PLA cardboard or biopolymer) represents a potential solution to deal with the increasing environmental impact due to both food and packaging waste.
- Barcodes have been used for decades in packaging many products. 2D barcodes used in autocoding are increasingly applied to food packaging to ensure that products are correctly packaged and date coded.
- The ability of a package to fully empty or dispense a viscous food is somewhat dependent on the surface energy of the inner walls of the container. The use of superhydrophobic surfaces is useful but can be further improved by using new lubricant-impregnated surfaces.

== Food packaging barriers ==
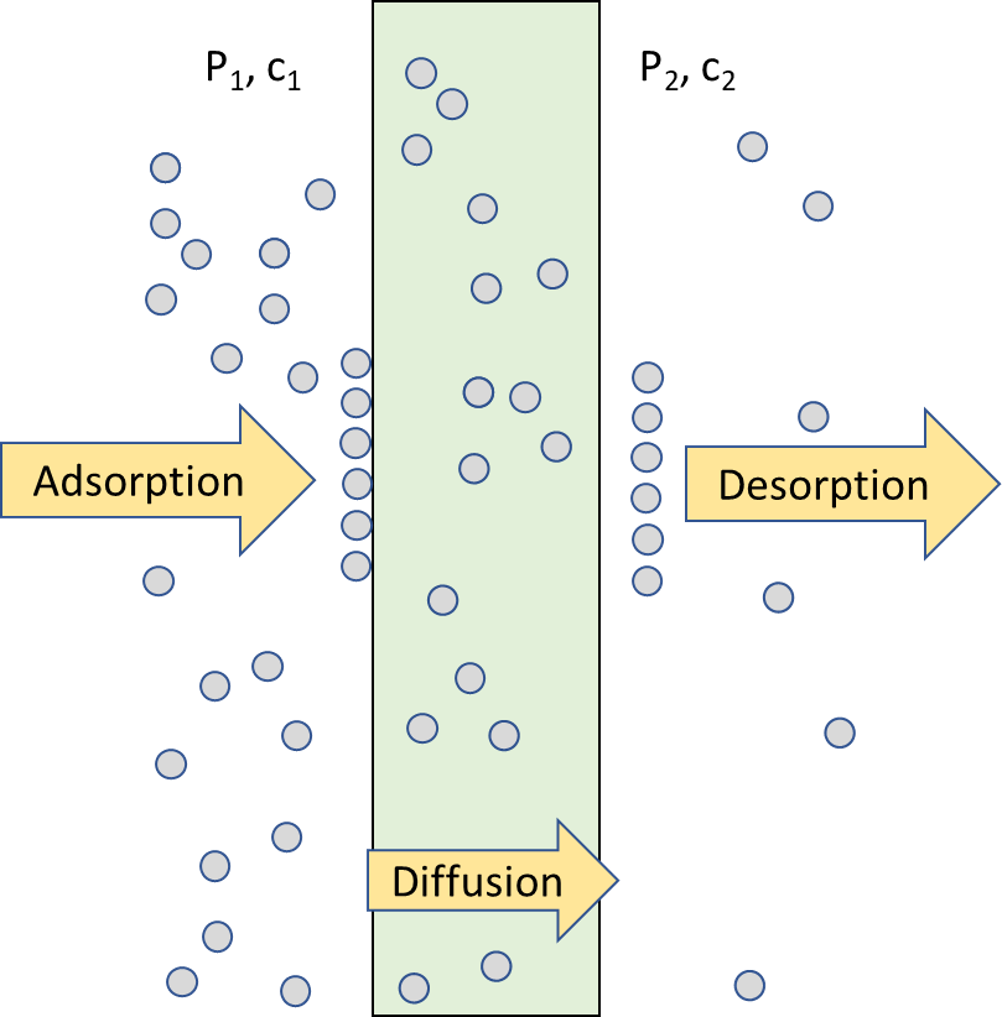
Physical processes involved in the permeability of a gas molecule across a packaging material

A critical requirement in food packaging is represented by the barrier properties against the permeation of gases, water vapor, and aroma compounds of the packaging system. In fact, the chemical interactions between the products and the environment are the principal reasons for improper shelf-life and spoilage phenomena. Therefore, the evaluation of the gas exchange by means of the permeation of gas molecules is a crucial aspect in designing a product.

The permeation of a gas molecule through a packaging system is a physical process made up of three independent phenomena: the adsorption of the molecule to the packaging's outer surface; the diffusion of the molecule through the packaging's section; and the desorption in the internal headspace. Under the assumption of steady state conditions, the physical processes involved in the permeation can be modeled by simple equations. Particularly, the diffusion of a permeant's molecule is dependent to the concentration difference between the two sides of the packaging system, which acts as a driving force, thus creating a diffusive flux following the first Fick's law of diffusion.

Furthermore, other assumptions are needed, such as the absence of chemical interaction between the penetrant and the packaging material and the fact that the diffusion flow must follow only one direction. The adsorption/desorption processes of a permeant's molecule normally exhibit a linear dependency with the partial pressure gradient across the barrier layer, while keeping the assumption of steady-state transport conditions and exhibiting a concentration lower than the penetrant's maximum solubility, thereby adhering to Henry's law of solubility.

The type of permeant, the barrier layer's thickness, the specific permeabilities of the packaging films against gases or vapors, the packaging's permeable area, the temperature, and the pressure or concentration gradient between the barrier's interior and external sides can all have an impact on a system's permeability.

The gas exchange occurring between the packaging system and the external environment has a significant impact on the quality and safety of food products. Uncontrolled physico-chemical and biological processes, such as oxidation of vitamins, excessive microbial growth, and spoilage of the packed food, may lead to improper conditions inside the packaging headspace, hence reducing their shelf-life. Therefore, the packaging system should be designed to create the ideal conditions for the selected product, avoiding excessive gas exchange.

Among the permeants that could affect the organoleptic properties of food, oxygen and water vapor represent the most important ones. These permeants affect several bio-chemical processes in food products, such as ripening, degradation, hydration/dehydration, microbial growth, vitamins oxidation; they also have an impact on the organoleptic properties, hence causing off-flavours, excessive weight loss, textural changing and generally shortening the shelf life.

To quantify the barrier properties of a packaging system, both oxygen and water vapor permeation are commonly assessed by measuring the oxygen transmission rate (OTR) and water vapor transmission rate (WVTR), respectively.

=== Oxygen barrier ===
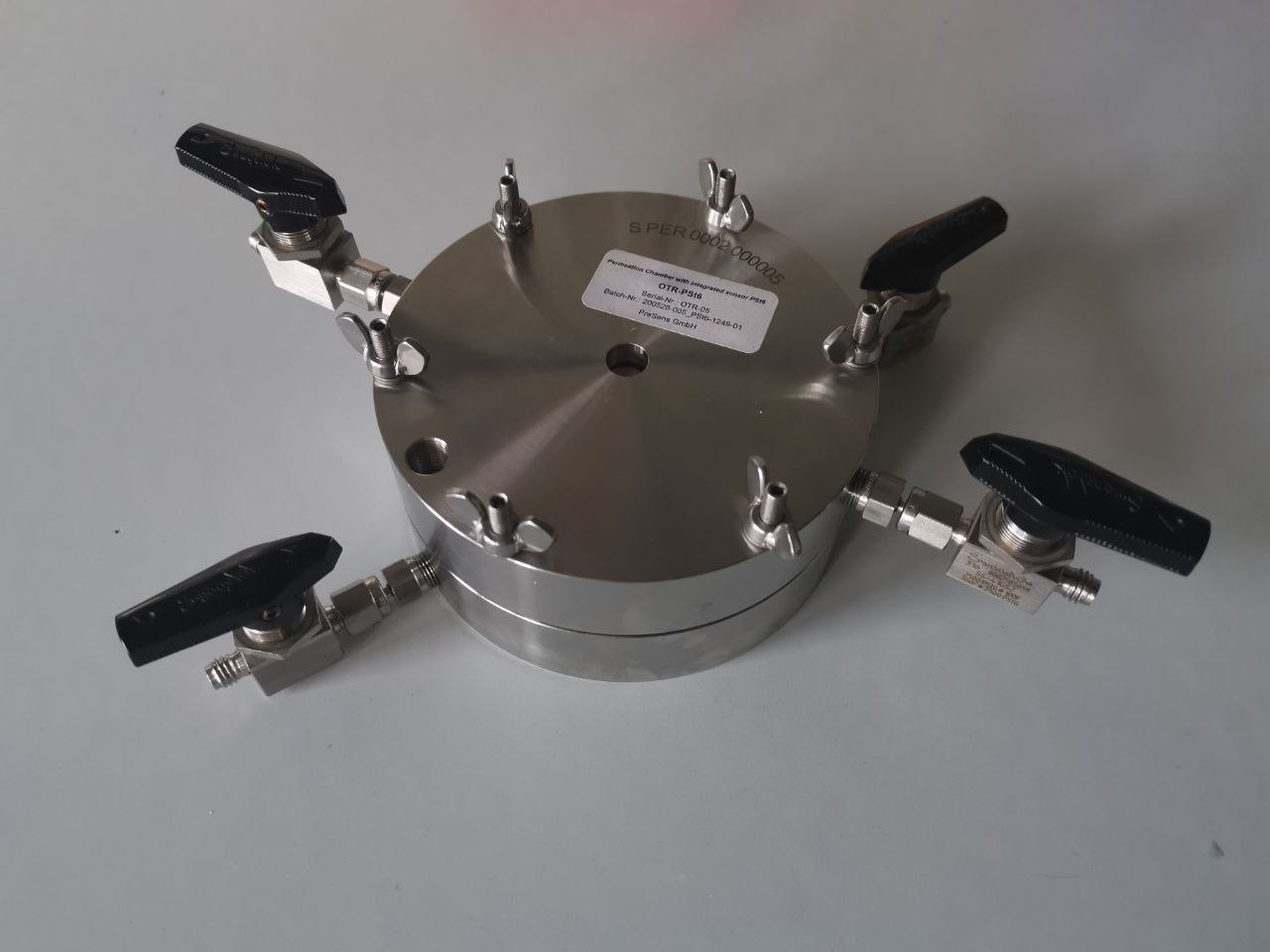
Permeation cell setup for the measurement of the oxygen transmission rate

The oxygen transmission rate of a gas through packaging is defined as the amount of oxygen permeating per unit of permeable area and per unit of time in a packaging system considering standardized test conditions (23 °C and 1 atm. partial pressure difference). It is an effective tool to estimate the barrier properties of a certain material. The determination of the OTR is usually carried out by means of a steady-state and isostatic method, reported by the ASTM D 3985 or ASTM F 1307, containing respectively standardized protocols for the measurements of the OTR of several kinds of packaging.

The typical instrumentation consists in a permeation cell composed by two distinct chambers, separated by the tested material; one of the chambers is then filled with a carrier gas (e.g., nitrogen), while the other one with oxygen, hence creating the necessary driving force to let the oxygen permeate across the barrier's material.

=== Water vapor barrier ===
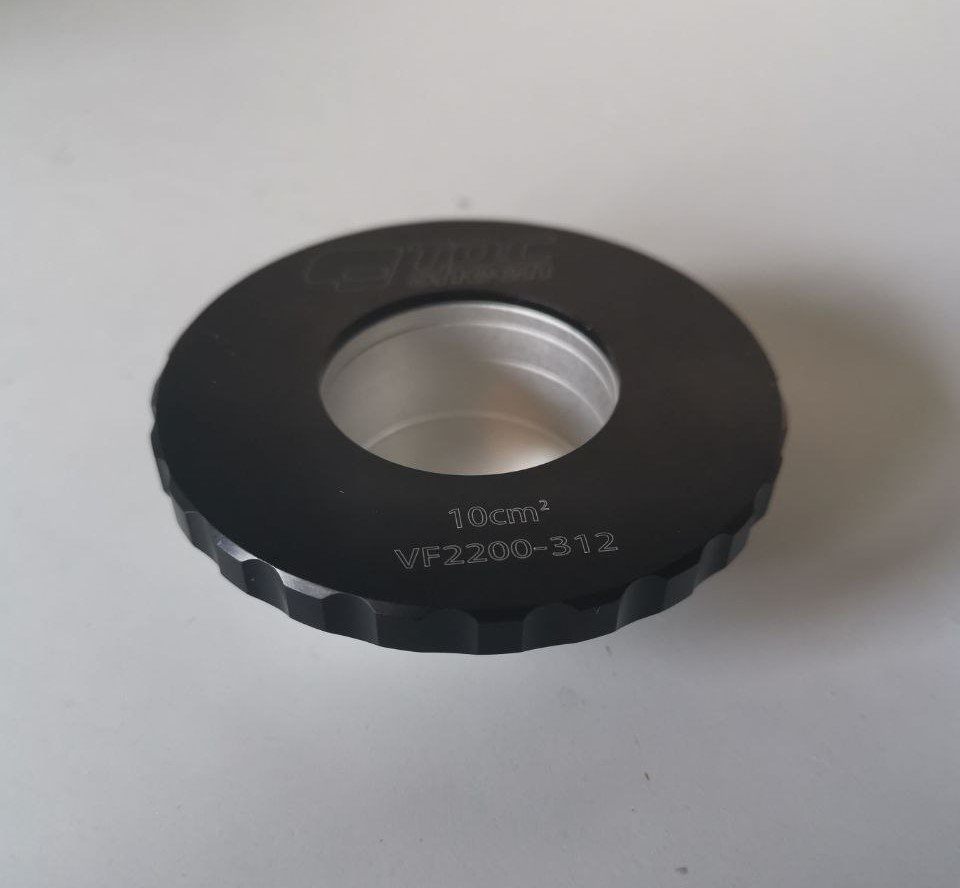
Water vapor transmission rate measurement setup, consisting in a stainless-steel cups filled with water or a dessicant

Concurrently to the oxygen barrier property, the permeability of water vapor through a food packaging system should be minimized to effectively prevent physical and chemical changes connected to an excessive moisture content. The moisture barrier properties of a material can be assessed by measuring the water vapor transmission rate (WVTR), which can be defined as the amount of water vapor per unit of area and unit of time passing through the packaging film.

The WVTR measurements, like the OTR, adhere to the standards for standardized tests, as outlined in the ASTM E96 (standard methods for water vapor transmission of materials). An impermeable test dish (such as a stainless steel cup) and a test chamber, where temperature and relative humidity (RH) can be adjusted in accordance with the standard specification, make up the basic instrumentation used in such tests.

=== Other vapors ===
Although both oxygen and water vapor represent the most studied permeants in food packaging applications, other gases such as carbon dioxide (CO_{2}) and nitrogen (N_{2}) have also great relevance in the preservation of food products. In fact, N_{2} and CO_{2} have been employed in modified atmosphere packaging (MAP) technology, to establish the correct conditions inside the package's headspace to lessen food spoiling.

== The role of sealing in food packaging ==
In food packaging, sealing plays an important role in ensuring food safety, product preservation, and package integrity. Sealing is used to hermetically close bags made of plastic or multilayer materials, such as pouches, trays, or flexible films. More employed techniques in food industry include heat sealing, which requires the use of hot air, ultrasound, or induction to generate heat, laser sealing, and cold sealing.

These processes guarantee a barrier against external agents, such as oxygen, moisture, light, and microorganisms, preventing contamination and extending the product's shelf life. The quality of the seal is a critical parameter: a defective seal can lead to the degradation of organoleptic properties and also compromise food safety. For this reason, the food industry adopts international quality control standards to assess the integrity of the sealing.

== Food safety and public health ==
It is critical to maintain food safety during processing, packaging, storage, logistics (including cold chain), sale, and use. Conformance to applicable regulations is mandatory. Some are country specific, such as the US Food and Drug Administration and the US Department of Agriculture; others are regional, such as the European Food Safety Authority. Certification programs such as the Global Food Safety Initiative are sometimes used. Food packaging considerations may include: use of hazard analysis and critical control points, verification and validation protocols, Good manufacturing practices, use of an effective quality management system, track and trace systems, and requirements for label content. Special food contact materials are used when the package is in direct contact with the food product. Depending on the packaging operation and the food, packaging machinery often needs specified daily wash-down and cleaning procedures.

Health risks of materials and chemicals that are used in food packaging need to be carefully controlled. Carcinogens, toxic chemicals, mutagens etc. need to be eliminated from food contact and potential migration into foods. Besides, the consumers need to be aware of certain chemical products that are packaged exactly like food products to attract them. Most of them have pictures of fruits, and the containers also resemble food packages. However, they can get consumed by kids or careless adults and lead to poisoning. Microplastics and nanoparticles from plastic containers are an increasing concern.

=== Manufacturing ===
Packaging lines can have a variety of equipment types: integration of automated systems can be a challenge. All aspects of food production, including packaging, are tightly controlled and have regulatory requirements. Uniformity, cleanliness and other requirements are needed to maintain Good Manufacturing Practices.

Product safety management is vital. A complete Quality Management System must be in place. Hazard Analysis and Critical Control Points is one methodology which has been proven useful. Verification and validation involves collecting documentary evidence of all aspects of compliance. Quality assurance extends beyond the packaging operations, through distribution and cold chain management.

== History ==
Packaging of food products has seen a vast transformation in technology usage and application from the Stone Age to the Industrial Revolution:

7000 BC: The adoption of pottery and glass, with widespread production beginning around 1500 BC.

1700s: The first manufacturing production of tinplate was introduced in England (1699) and in France (1720). Afterwards, the Dutch Navy started to use such packaging to prolong the preservation of food products.

1804: Nicolas Appert, in response to inquiries into extending the shelf life of food for the French Army, employed glass bottles with heat sterilization. Glass was later replaced by metal cans in this application. However, there has been debate about who first introduced the use of tinplates as food packaging.

1870: The use of paper board was launched, and corrugated materials were patented.

1880s: First cereal packaged in a folding box by Quaker Oats.

1890s: The crown cap for glass bottles was patented by William Painter.

1950s: The bag-in-box system was invented by American chemist William R. Scholle – initially for acid liquids, but quickly also used for food liquids.

1960s: Development of the two-piece drawn and wall-ironed metal cans in the US, along with the ring-pull opener and the Tetra Brik Aseptic carton package.

1970s: The barcode system was introduced in the retail and manufacturing industry. PET plastic blow-mold bottle technology, which is widely used in the beverage industry, was introduced.

1990s: The application of digital printing on food packages became widely adopted.

Plastic packaging saw its inaugural use during World War II, even though materials employed in its manufacturing (such as cellulose nitrate, styrene, and vinyl chloride) were discovered in the 1800s.

== See also ==
- Codex Alimentarius – Collection of internationally recognized food standards
- Dietary supplement – Product providing additional nutrients
- Disposable product – Product designed to be discarded after use
- Edible packaging – Food containers which can be eaten
- Autocoding
- Food and Bioprocess Technology
- Calabash – Species of bottle gourd plant
- disposable food packaging
- Food fortification – Process of adding micronutrients to food products
- Food grading – Inspection and sorting of foodstuffs for various parameters
- Food preservation – Inhibition of microbial growth in food
- Food rheology – Study of the fluid mechanical properties of food
- Food safety – Scientific discipline
- List of food safety organisations
- Food storage – Type of storage that allows food to be eaten after time
- Food storage container
- Food waste – Food that is discarded, lost or uneaten
- Food waste in the United Kingdom – Overview of food wastage in the United Kingdom
- ISO 22000 – Food safety Management System Standard
- Nutraceutical – Marketing term for supplement
- Packaging waste – Post-use container and packing refuse
- Food labeling regulations – Regulations and standards for food labeling
- United Kingdom food labeling regulations – Food labelling laws in the UK
- Packaging industry – Enclosure or protection of products
- Washdown – Cleaning or washing a surface for appearance, sanitation, or removal of contamination
- WikiCell

== Bibliography ==
- Bässler, Hans-Jürgen; Lehmann, Frank (2013). Containment Technology: Progress in the Pharmaceutical and Food Processing Industry. Berlin: Springer. ISBN 978-3-642-39291-7.
- Heldman, D. R., ed. (2003). Encyclopedia of Agricultural, Food, and Biological Engineering. New York: Marcel Dekker.
- Potter, N. N.; Hotchkiss, J. H. (1995). Food Science (5th ed.). New York: Chapman & Hall. pp. 478–513.
- Robertson, G. L. (2013). Food Packaging: Principles & Practice. CRC Press. ISBN 978-1-4398-6241-4.
- Selke, S. (1994). Packaging and the Environment (Revised ed.). CRC Press. ISBN 1-56676-104-2.
- Selke, Susan E. M.; Culter, John D.; Hernandez, Ruben J. (2004). Plastics Packaging. Hanser. ISBN 1-56990-372-7.
- Soroka, W. (2009). Fundamentals of Packaging Technology. Institute of Packaging Professionals. ISBN 978-1-930268-28-9.
- Stillwell, E. J. (1991). Packaging for the Environment. A. D. Little. ISBN 0-8144-5074-1.
- Yam, K. L. (2009). Encyclopedia of Packaging Technology. John Wiley & Sons. ISBN 978-0-470-08704-6.
