= List of food safety organisations =

This is a list of organizations and associated posts which are related to food safety, either as a primary interest or through statutory responsibility. National organizations are grouped by the UN geoscheme.

== Africa ==
- Africa Food Safety Forum (AFSF)
- African Food Safety Network (AFoSaN)
- The Food Safety and Quality Authority of The Gambia (FSQA)
- Tanzanian Food and Drugs Authority (TFDA)
- Ethiopian Food and Drug Authority (EFDA)
- Moroccan National Office of Food Safety (ONSSA)
- South African National Regulator for Compulsory Specifications (NRCS)
- Egyptian Food Safety Authority
- Ghana Food and Drugs Authority
  - National Agency for Food and Drug Administration and Control
- Nigerian Food and Drugs Authority
  - National Agency For Food And Drug Administration and Control
    - Kaduna State Livestock Regulatory Authority

== Americas ==
- Argentina
  - Minister of Economy
    - Secretariat of Agriculture, Livestock, Fishing and Food
      - National Food Safety and Quality Service (SENASA) Servicio Nacional de Sanidad y Calidad Agroalimentaria
- Brazil
  - Agência Nacional de Vigilância Sanitária (Anvisa)
- Canada
  - Minister of Agriculture
    - Agriculture and Agri-Food Canada (AAFC)
      - Canadian Food Inspection Agency (CFIA)
  - Minister of Health
    - Health Canada
      - Health Products and Food Branch
  - Guelph Food Technology Centre (Canada)
- United States of America
  - U.S. Food and Drug Administration (FDA)
    - Center for Food Safety and Applied Nutrition (CFSAN)
  - International Food Protection Training Institute (IFPTI)
  - Joint Expert Committee on Food Additives (JECFA)
  - United States Department of Agriculture (USDA)
    - Under Secretary for Food Safety
      - Food Safety and Inspection Service (FSIS)

== Asia ==
- Bangladesh
  - Bangladesh Food Safety Authority (BFSA)
- Burma
  - Food and Drug Administration (Burma)
- China
  - General Administration of Quality Supervision, Inspection and Quarantine
  - State Food and Drug Administration
- Hong Kong SAR
  - Centre for Food Safety
- India
  - Food Safety and Standards Authority of India
    - Food and Drug Administration, Maharashtra State
- Indonesia
  - National Agency of Drug and Food Control of Indonesia
- Iran
  - Food and Drug Administration
- Kazakhstan
  - Islamic Organisation for Food Security
- Malaysia
  - Ministry of Health (MOH)
  - Food Safety and Quality Division (FSQD)
- Nepal
  - Department of Livestock Services
  - Ministry of Agriculture and Livestock Development
  - Department of Food Technology and Quality Control
- Philippines
  - Food and Drug Administration (Philippines)
- South Korea
  - Ministry of Food and Drug Safety (MFDS)
  - Minister for Health, Welfare and Family Affairs
    - Ministry for Health, Welfare and Family Affairs
      - Office for Healthcare Policy
- Taiwan
  - Ministry of Health and Welfare (MHW)
  - Food and Drug Administration (TFDA)
- Saudi Arabia
  - Saudi Food and Drug Authority

== Europe ==
- Multinational
  - European Union
    - Committee on the Environment, Public Health and Food Safety (EU)
    - European Food Safety Authority
    - SAFE FOODS
  - Food Safety Promotion Board
- Belgium
  - Federal Agency for the Safety of the Food Chain
- France
  - Agence nationale de sécurité sanitaire de l'alimentation, de l'environnement et du travail
- Greece
  - Hellenic Food Authority
- Germany
  - Federal Ministry of Food, Agriculture and Consumer Protection
    - Federal Institute for Risk Assessment (BfR) Bundesinstitut für Risikobewertung
    - Federal Office of Consumer Protection and Food Safety Bundesamt für Verbraucherschutz und Lebensmittelsicherheit
    - Bundesanstalt für Landwirtschaft und Ernährung
- Italy
  - Ministry of Health
- Netherlands
  - Ministry of Agriculture, Fisheries, Food Security and Nature (LVVN)
    - Nederlandse Voedsel en Waren Autoriteit (NVWA)
  - Ministry of Health, Welfare and Sport (VWS)
    - Rijksinstituut voor Volksgezondheid en Milieu (RiVM)
  - Stichting Voedingscentrum Nederland
- Norway
  - Minister of Agriculture and Food
    - Norwegian Ministry of Agriculture and Food Landbruks- og matdepartementet
      - Norwegian Food Safety Authority Mattilsynet
- Portugal
  - Ministry of Economy
    - Economic and Food Safety Authority Autoridade de Segurança Alimentar e Económica, ASAE
- Spain
  - Ministerio de Sanidad, Consumo y Bienestar Social, Gobierno de España
    - Agencia Española de Seguridad Alimentaria y Nutrición (AESAN)
- United Kingdom
  - Department for Environment, Food and Rural Affairs
    - Animal Health
    - Pesticides Safety Directorate
    - UK Government Decontamination Service
    - Veterinary Medicines Directorate
  - Food Standards Agency
  - British Retail Consortium (BRC)
- Advisory committee on the microbiological safety of food
  - Food Standards Scotland

== Oceania ==
- Multinational
  - Food Standards Australia New Zealand (FSANZ)
- Australia
  - Minister for Agriculture, Drought and Emergency Management
    - Department of Agriculture, Water and the Environment
  - Government of New South Wales
    - Minister for Primary Industries (NSW)
      - New South Wales Food Authority
- New Zealand
  - Minister for Food Safety
    - New Zealand Food Safety Authority (NZFSA)

== See also ==
- Institute of Food and Agricultural Sciences in Nigeria
- Institute of Food Technologists
- International Association for Food Protection
- International Food Information Council
- International Life Sciences Institute
- Food Administration
- Hazard analysis and critical control points
