= WikiCell =

WikiCell is a food‑packaging concept in which the container is itself edible. The packaging consists of a natural soft membrane (made from food particles, alginate/chitosan, and nutritive ions) that encloses the food or drink, optionally protected by a hard shell that is edible or biodegradable.

The concept was developed by bioengineer David A. Edwards and collaborators around 2010. A startup company, originally called Incredible Foods (later rebranded as Foodberry), was established in 2012 to commercialize the technology.

As of 2019, the original consumer product line has been discontinued. Foodberry now operates as a food‑tech company offering edible and compostable coating and packaging technology, often in partnership with other food brands.

While WikiCell remains a recognized edible‑packaging technology, it appears not to have achieved the widespread commercial distribution once envisioned, and its current use is primarily within a B2B technology platform rather than a mainstream consumer product line.
