= Multilayered packaging =

Type of retail packaging

Multilayer beverage cartons

Multilayer packaging is a form of composite material that combines two or more distinct layers, each chosen for protective or functional properties. Typical materials include polyethylene (PE), polyethylene terephthalate (PET), polyamide (PA), ethylene vinyl alcohol (EVOH), aluminum foil, and paperboard. Multilayer formats are used in films, cartons, pouches, bottles, and tubes to extend shelf life, reduce spoilage, and provide mechanical strength.

== History ==
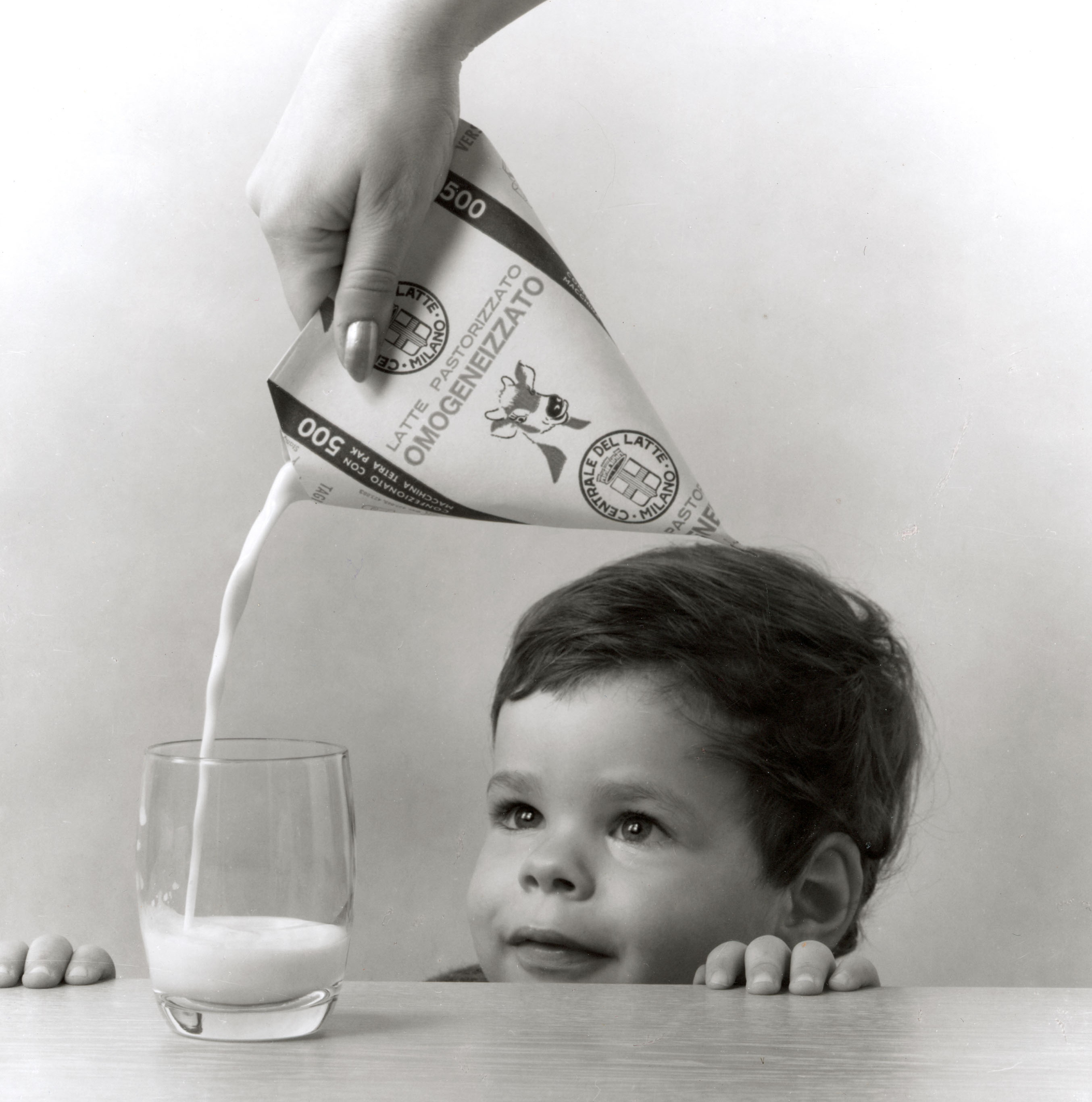
Early aseptic cartons, Italy, 1960s

Multilayer packaging was developed in the mid-20th century to overcome the performance limits of single-layer materials. An early example is the aseptic carton introduced by Tetra Pak in the 1960s, combining paperboard, polyethylene, and aluminium foil. In the 1970s and 1980s, multilayer films were adopted for vacuum pouches and heat-stable bags. By the 1990s, advances in lamination and coextrusion made them widely used in the food and pharmaceutical industries.

== Types ==
Multilayer packaging varies by material combination and application.

- Multi-wall paper sacks – layers of kraft paper, sometimes with polyethylene, for cement, fertilizer, and bulk foods
- Laminated cartons – paperboard with aluminium foil and plastics, used for milk, juice, and syrups
- Plastic bottles and tubes – combinations such as PET/EVOH/PE, used for sauces, juices, and cosmetics
- High-barrier pouches – flexible laminates with PA, EVOH, or oxide coatings, used for sterilized or ready-to-eat meals

== Food packaging ==
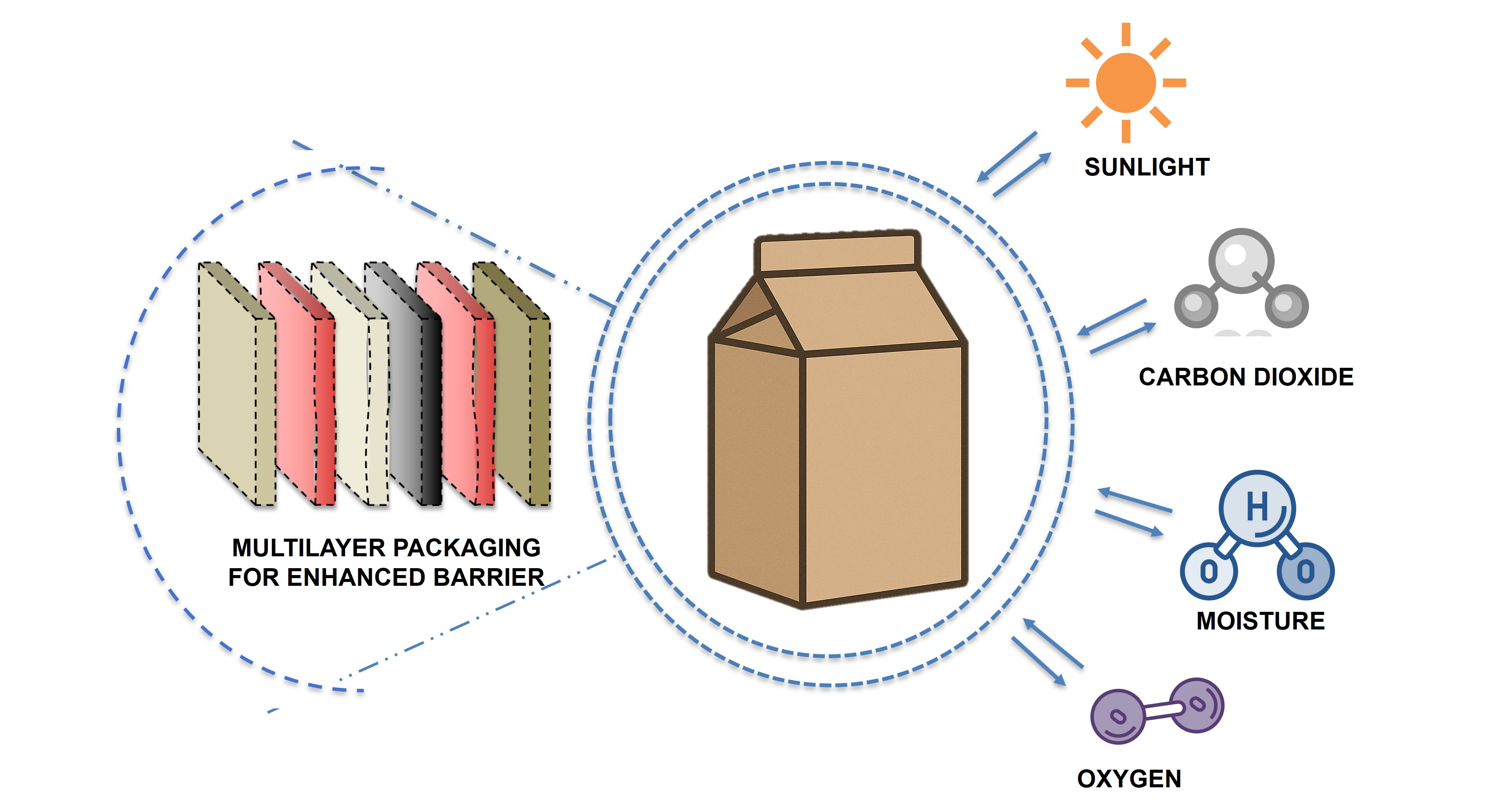
Example of multilayer food package with barrier layers

Multilayer systems are widely used for food preservation because they block oxygen, light, and moisture. EVOH is often used as an oxygen barrier, while polyolefins provide moisture resistance. Another application is modified atmosphere packaging (MAP), which replaces air with controlled gases such as nitrogen or carbon dioxide to slow microbial growth.

== Manufacturing ==
Three main processes are used:

- Coextrusion – simultaneous extrusion of polymers, often with tie layers
- Lamination – bonding prefabricated films, foils, or paper layers with adhesives or heat
- Coating – applying functional layers onto substrates,

== End-of-life ==
Multilayer packaging is difficult to recycle because of its mixed-material structure. As of 2018 less than 5% was recycled at scale, with most waste incinerated or landfilled. Possible approach include solvent-based separation, compatibilizers, and enzymatic depolymerization of PET. Another route under study is structural separation, where multilayer structures are first separated into mono-material fractions before recycling.

== See also ==
- Food packaging
- Plastic recycling
- Packaging waste
- Modified atmosphere packaging
- Food preservation
