= Food administration =

Govern agency regulating food products

A food safety agency or food administration or Food Safety Authority is a government agency responsible for ensuring the safety, quality, and proper labeling of food products within a country or region. These agencies play a crucial role in protecting public health by establishing and enforcing regulations and standards to ensure that food produced, imported, processed, distributed, and sold is safe for consumption.

Examples of Food Administrations around the world include the United States Food and Drug Administration (FDA), the European Food Safety Authority (EFSA), the Canadian Food Inspection Agency (CFIA), and the Swedish Food Agency (Livsmedelsverket). Each agency operates within its respective jurisdiction and collaborates with other national and international organizations to promote and maintain food safety globally.

== North America ==
=== United States ===
- The Center for Food Safety and Applied Nutrition, the branch of the United States Food and Drug Administration that regulates food, dietary supplements, and cosmetics,
- The Food and Drug Administration (United States), an agency of the United States Department of Health and Human Services responsible for protecting and promoting public health through the regulation and supervision of food safety, tobacco products, dietary supplements, medications, vaccines, biopharmaceuticals, blood transfusions, medical devices, electromagnetic radiation emitting devices, veterinary products, and cosmetics,
- The Food Safety Commission, a commission directed in 2002 to be established in the United States to report to the President and Congress on enhancing the food safety system,
- The United States Food Administration, the responsible agency for the administration of the Allies' food reserves during the United States' participation in World War I.

=== Canada ===
- The Canadian Food Inspection Agency (CFIA) is responsible for the overseeing of food, animals, and plants. The CFIA also are concerned with the health and well-being of Canadians, the economy and the environment. The health and safety of Canadians is top priority for the CFIA which is why they collaborate with industry, consumers, federal, provincial, and municipal organizations in efforts to try to protect Canadians from food related health-risks and diseases. The CFIA website also includes a list of recalls from items that could potentially cause health-risks and diseases to Canadians. The CFIA is also transparent with its information, data, reports, and publications to Canadian citizens.
- The CFIA are also fair, strategic, consistent, and transparent in their approach regarding the enforcement of policies to ensure that the delivery of its mandate is effective. There are three policy objectives: increased awareness of compliance and enforcement by the CFIA, consistent implementation of regulatory control and enforcement of the procedures set by the CFIA, and increased compliance by the regulated parties to the legislation managed by the CFIA. The CFIA has a variety of acts and regulations such as: the Agriculture and Agri-Food Administrative Monetary Penalties Act, Canadian Food Inspection Agency Act, Feeds Act, Fertilizers Act, Food and Drugs Act, Health of Animals Act, Plant Breeders' Rights Act, Plant Protection Act, Safe Food for Canadians Act, and the Seeds Act.

== South America ==
=== Argentina ===
- The National Food Safety and Quality Service, an independent agency of the Argentine government.

== Asia ==
=== People's Republic of China ===
The State Food and Drug Administration, the agency of the government of the People's Republic of China in charge of comprehensive supervision of the safety management of food, health food, and cosmetics, and the competent authority for drug regulation.

=== Singapore ===
In Singapore Food Administration in terms of Food safety is controlled for the Gastronomy in Singapore by the National Environment Agency (NEA). Goods which are imported/exported to the Little red dot are regulated/controlled by Agri-Food and Veterinary Authority of Singapore (AVA).

=== India ===
Food Safety and Standards Authority of India (FSSAI) is an autonomous body established under the Ministry of Health & Family Welfare, Government of India. The organisation is responsible for protecting and promoting public health through the regulation and supervision of food safety.

== Australia and New Zealand ==
- The Food Standards Australia New Zealand, the governmental body responsible for developing food standards for Australia and New Zealand.
- The New Zealand Food Safety Authority, the New Zealand government body responsible for food safety and the controlling authority for imports and exports of food and food-related products.

== Europe ==
=== European Parliament and European Union ===
- The Committee on the Environment, Public Health and Food Safety, a committee of the European Parliament responsible for environmental policy and environmental protection measures, public health, and food safety issues,
- The European Food Safety Authority, an agency of the European Union that provides independent scientific advice and communication on existing and emerging risks associated with the food chain

=== Ireland and Northern Ireland ===
- The Food Safety Authority of Ireland is responsible for the enforcement of food safety regulations and standards in the Republic of Ireland,
- The UK Food Standards Agency has jurisdiction in Northern Ireland,
- The Food Safety Promotion Board, the body responsible for the promotion of food safety in the Republic of Ireland and Northern Ireland

=== Netherlands ===
- The Ministry of Agriculture, Nature and Food Quality (Netherlands), a ministry of the government of the Netherlands responsible for agriculture, fisheries, natural conservation, open-air recreation and national parks, food safety, and rural development.

=== Norway ===
- The Norwegian Food Safety Authority, a Norwegian government agency responsible for safe food and drinking water; human, plant, fish, and animal health; environmentally friendly production and ethically acceptable farming of animals; cosmetics; medicines; and the inspection of animal health personnel.

=== Sweden ===
- The National Food Administration (Sweden), a Swedish government agency that is the central supervisory authority for matters relating to food and drinking water.

=== United Kingdom ===
- The Food Standards Agency, a non-ministerial department of the Government of the United Kingdom responsible for protecting public health in relation to food.

== United Nations and World Health Organization ==
- The Joint FAO/WHO Expert Committee on Food Additives, a scientific expert committee jointly run by the United Nations Food and Agriculture Organization and the World Health Organization.

== See also ==
- Agriculture ministry, a ministry or other government agency charged with agriculture. The ministry is often headed by a minister for agriculture.
- Fisheries management, draws on fisheries science in order to find ways to protect fishery resources so sustainable exploitation is possible.
- Food quality, the quality characteristics of food that is acceptable to consumers.
- Food safety, a scientific discipline describing handling, preparation, and storage of food in ways that prevent foodborne illness.
- List of non-profit food safety organisations
