= SAFE FOODS =

SAFE FOODS

SAFE FOODS is a European project established in 2004 that deals with food safety. It aims to contribute to the restoration of consumer confidence in the safety of the European food chain, to protect the consumer from foodborne illness, and to refine risk analysis practices for food safety via an interdisciplinary approach. The full title of the project is "SAFE FOODS - Promoting a new, Integrated Risk Analysis Approach for Foods". The project is funded by the European Union (EU) Directorate-General for Research (European Commission) via the Sixth Framework Programme, under the ‘Quality and Safety of Food’ Priority Area. SAFE FOODS is also a founding member of COMMNET, a communication managers' network of several Sixth Framework projects dealing with food quality and safety issues. More than 95 natural and social scientists are involved in the project, coming from 37 institutions in 21 countries.

== Thematic research areas ==
A broad range of research disciplines are used in the SAFE FOODS project, including molecular biology, microbiology, toxicology, probabilistic modeling, and disciplines of the social sciences and the political sciences.

SAFE FOODS is divided in 5 sub-projects, namely

- Comparative safety evaluation of plant breeding approaches and production practices,
- Early detection of emerging food and feed risks,
- Quantitative risk assessment of combined exposure to food contaminants and natural toxins,
- Consumer research of food risk management perceptions, and
- Institutional challenges and solutions to systemic risk management.

== Background ==
The governance of food safety has long been regarded as the domain of “experts” and professional risk managers, with minimal input from other interested parties such as consumers. However, a number of food safety incidents in Europe, related to, for example, genetically modified organisms, bovine spongiform encephalopathy, and dioxins, have severely damaged public trust in food safety regulation and management. This exposed a need for improvement in the current approach to food risk analysis.

The SAFE FOODS project has been funded by the EU to develop a new approach in food risk analysis, integrating risk-benefit assessment of human health, consumer preferences and values, as well as impact analysis of socio-economical aspects. Compared to current frameworks, a lot of attention is given to active stakeholder (corporate) participation, increased transparency (humanities) in decision-making, improved interaction between risk assessors and risk managers and more effective communication throughout the risk analysis process.

== See also ==
- CommNet
- Food safety
