= Swedish National Food Agency =

Swedish administrative authority

The Swedish Food Agency (Swedish: Livsmedelsverket), formerly the National Swedish Food Administration (Swedish: Statens livsmedelsverk) is a Swedish government agency that answers to the Ministry of Agriculture, Food and Consumer Affairs. The agency is located in Uppsala.

It is the central supervisory authority for matters relating to food and drinking water. It has the task of protecting consumer interest by working for safe food of good quality, fair practices in the food trade, and healthy eating habits.

== See also ==
- Food Administration
- Government agencies in Sweden
