= Autocoding =

Autocoding refers to software solutions that help manufacturers, particularly those in the food industry, ensure that products have the correct packaging and correct 'sell by' date codes, thereby reducing the number of Emergency Product Withdrawals (EPW). The term was first used during an initiative between Geest PLC (acquired by Bakkavör in 2005) and Tesco in 2001.

The key objective of the software was to reduce the number of EPW's associated with date and price coding errors, and pot and lid marriage errors. This still remains the main objective of autocoding software, but functionality has been expanded to encompass quality assurance and OEE performance data.

== History ==
The concept of autocoding originally came from an initiative between Geest PLC and Tesco in 2001, with both parties seeking to reduce the number of emergency product withdrawals associated with packaging and date coding errors. From here, several software engineering companies expanded on this preliminary work to create more reliable and robust systems. In 2004, 2D barcoding was introduced for the first time, a major step forward for the securing of all parts of food packaging.

Prior to this, 1D retail barcodes were used that only offered limited protection as they did not cover all packaging on products. 2D barcodes meant that lids, sleeves, pack could all be identified by a barcode scanner to check that the product is packaged and dated correctly. In 2009, Marks & Spencer introduced a code of practice for the labelling of products that stipulated an autocoding system must be used on every production line. In 2013, it was estimated that autocoding software protects over 1500 lines in the United Kingdom; the largest supplier is Olympus Automation, which protects 723 food production lines.

== Elements ==
All autocoding systems comprise a products database which contains standard reference information for each product including packaging type, labels and sell by date criteria. In most cases, a touch screen industrial PC is positioned on the shop-floor to allow the operator to select the next product from a product schedule.

=== 1D and 2D barcode scanning ===
The shop-floor touch screen device is linked to barcode scanners deployed to scan the code on each piece of packaging, including promotional labels and sleeves. Originally, the bar codes scanned were based on standard 1D codes, however, to avoid mistakes, 2D bar codes were introduced in 2004 so that each packaging type could hold a unique identity. To check that the scanners are operational, autocoding solutions include two way communications with all hardware devices and prevent the lines from starting if links are not available.

=== Date code printing ===
To ensure that ‘sell by dates’ are accurate, most autocoding systems directly control the line printers through the software application. Once the operator has selected the product to run, the product reference table identifies the date range to use and the printer output is sent directly to the printer. Like the bar code scanners, autocoding systems include two-way communications with date code printers and prevents the production lines from starting if links are not available.

=== Line stops ===
If any error is detected, such as wrong film/pack, wrong lid, wrong case, or printer fault, the line is stopped. This standard requirement is achieved through the use of programmable logic controllers.

== Providers ==
Numerous companies provide autocoding solutions, ranging from standalone systems to comprehensive MES/MIS solutions that incorporate additional features and benefits. Notable industrial vendors include:

Product Name	Vendor
AutoCoding	Xact Control
Check Sure AutoCoding	Faedah Solutions
Autocoding	OAL - Olympus Automation
AutoCoding	AutoCoding Systems
Harford Control Compliance	Harford Control Ltd
Sparc Systems Ltd	Sparc Systems
