= Agglomerated food powder =

Agglomerated food powder is a unit operation during which native particles are assembled to form bigger agglomerates, in which the original particle can still be distinguished. Agglomeration can be achieved through processes that use liquid as a binder (wet methods) or methods that do not involve any binder (dry methods).

== Description ==
The liquid used in wet methods can be added directly to the product or via a humid environment. Using a fluidized bed dryer and multiple step spray drying are two examples of wet methods while roller compacting and extrusion are two examples of dry methods.

Advantages of agglomeration for food include:

1. Dust reduction: Dust reduction is achieved when the smallest particles (or "fines") in the product are combined into larger particles.
2. Improved flow: Flow improvement occurs as the larger, and sometimes more spherical, particles more easily pass over each other than the smaller or more irregularly-shaped particles in the original material.
3. Improved dispersion and/or solubility: Improved dispersion and solubility is sometimes achieved with instantization, in which the solubility of a product allows it to instantly dissolve upon its addition to water. For a powder to be considered instant it should go through wettability, sinkability, dispersibility, and solubility within a few seconds. Non-fat dry milk and high quality protein powders are good examples of instant powders.
4. Optimized bulk density: Consistent bulk density is important in accurate and consistent filling of packaging.
5. Improved product characteristics
6. Increased homogeneity of the finished product, reducing segregation of fine particles (such as powdered vitamins or spray-dried flavors) from larger particles (such as granulated sugars or acids). As a powder is agitated, smaller particles will fall to the bottom, and larger raise to the top. Agglomeration can reduce the range of particle sizes present in the product, reducing segregation.

Disadvantages of food agglomeration:

1. Extra cost. The benefits of handling an agglomerate often outweigh the extra cost involved in processing.
2. Additional processing time. Agglomeration of a finished blend is an additional step after blending.

Particle size distribution is an important parameter to monitor in agglomerated food products. In both wet and dry agglomeration, particles of undesired sizes must be removed to ensure the best possible finished product performance. High-powered cyclones are the most common way to separate undesired fine particles (or "fines") from larger agglomerates (or "overs"). Cyclones utilize the combination of wind power and the different densities of the two products to pull the fines out of the mix. The fines can then be reworked through the agglomeration process to reduce yield loss. In contrast, shaker screens are often used to separate out the overs from the rest of the product. The overs can be reworked into the process by first being broken into smaller particles.

== Wet agglomeration methods ==
Wet agglomeration is a process that introduces a liquid binder to develop adhesion forces between the dry particles to be agglomerated. Mixing disperses the liquid over the particles evenly and promotes growth of the aggregate to the desired size. A final drying step is required to stabilize the agglomerates.

In all wet agglomeration methods, the first step is wetting the particles. This initiates adhesion forces between the particles. The next step, nucleation, is the process by which the native particles come together and are held with liquid bridges and capillary forces. Then, through coalescence or the growth phase, these small groups of particles come together to create larger particles until the particles are the desired size. Consolidation occurs as the agglomerates increase in density and strength through drying and collisions with other particles. Mixing as the powder dries also causes some particles to break and erode, creating smaller particles and fines. To achieve the correct particle size, erosion and growth must be balanced. The last step in wet agglomeration is the final stabilization through drying. The agglomerated particles are dried to less than 5% water content, and cooled to below their glass transition temperature.

Wet agglomeration falls into two categories based on method of agitation: Mechanical mixing and pneumatic mixing.

=== Pneumatic mixing ===
Visual representation of agglomeration with pneumatic mixing

1. Steam-jet agglomeration: A continuous process wherein fine powders are exposed to steam to provide the necessary adhesion properties. Agglomeration is controlled by particle size distribution in the raw materials, gas and steam flow conditions and the adhesion forces between the particles. After the steam section the particles are exposed to warm air flowing upwards and countercurrent to the particles, which solidifies the liquid bridges formed between the particles. Advantages: used for many years in the food industry, a continuous process
2. Spray drying: Spray drying starts with a liquid raw material which is sprayed as fine droplets into heated air which causes the droplets to dry into fine particles. To agglomerate, fully dried particles (collected from the dry air outlet) are re-introduced at the point where the particles are partly dried and still sticky, to collide and create porous agglomerates. Spray drying agglomeration creates irregularly shaped, highly porous particles with excellent instant properties.
3. Fluid bed agglomeration uses an air stream to both agitate the particles and to dry the agglomerates. Fluidized bed dryers are hot-air driers in which the air is forced up through a layer of product. The air is evenly distributed along the chamber to maintain a uniform velocity and prevent areas of higher velocities. These dryers can either be batch or continuous. Batch processing methods tend to have more uniform moisture content throughout the product after drying whereas continuous driers vary more throughout the process and may require a finishing set. When used for agglomeration, fluidized bed dryers have spray nozzles located at various heights within the chamber, allowing a spray of water or a solution of other ingredients (the binding solution) to be sprayed on the particles as they are fluidized. This encourages the particles to stick together, and can impart other properties to the finished product. Examples of binding solutions are a water/sugar solution, or lecithin. In this method, particle wetting, growth, consolidation, erosion and drying all occur at the same time.
  Basic diagram that describes the process of creating agglomerated particles via spray dry principles.
  Diagram of a Fluid Bed Agglomerator

=== Mechanical mixing ===
Visual Representation of the Wet Granulation Process in Mechanical Mixing

1. Pan or disk agglomerators (rarely used for food powders): Pan or disk agglomerators use the rotation of a disk or bowl to agitate the powder as it is sprayed with water. This type of agglomeration creates agglomerates with higher density than agglomerates produced in fluidized beds.
2. Drum agglomerators: use a drum to agitate the powder as liquid is added via spraying along the drum. This is a continuous process, and the agglomerates are spherical due to the rotation of the drum. Advantages: can successfully agglomerate powders with a wide particle size distribution, and have lower energy needs than fluidized bed agglomerators. Drum agglomerators can handle very large capacities, but this is not an advantage in the food industry. Disadvantage: broad particle size distribution.
3. Mixer agglomeration: Mixer agglomerators agitate the powder with the use of a blade inside a bowl. The geometry of mixer agglomerators vary widely. The blade can be oriented vertically, horizontally or obliquely. Shear is variable, and the wetting solution is sprayed over the bulk of the powder as it is mixing. Advantages: can work with powders of large particle size distribution, and allow for good distribution of viscous liquids. Equipment is straight forward and common. This type of agglomeration results in relatively dense and spherical agglomerates.

== Dry agglomeration methods ==
Dry agglomeration is agglomeration performed without water or binding liquids, instead using compression only.

=== Roller compaction ===
Schematic of a Roller Compactor, Patent US7998505B2, Figure 3

Roller compaction is a process in which powders are forced between two rolls, which compress the powders into dense sticks or sheets. These sticks or sheets are then ground into granules. Material properties will affect the mechanical properties of the resulting granules. Food particles with crystalline structures will deform plastically under pressure, and amorphous materials will deform viscoelastically. Roller compaction is more commonly used on individual ingredients of a finished powdered food product, than on a blend of ingredients producing a granulated finished product.

Some advantages of roller compaction are

1. No need for binding solution
2. Dust-free powders are possible
3. Consistent granule size and bulk density.
4. Good option for moisture and heat-sensitive materials, as no drying is required.

Disadvantages:

1. May not be easily soluble in cold water due to high density and low porosity
2. High amount of fines which need to be re-worked may be produced
3. Specialized equipment is required, typically with large batch sizes (> 3k pounds)

Examples of agglomerated food powders: Sucrose, sodium chloride, monosodium glutamate and fibers.

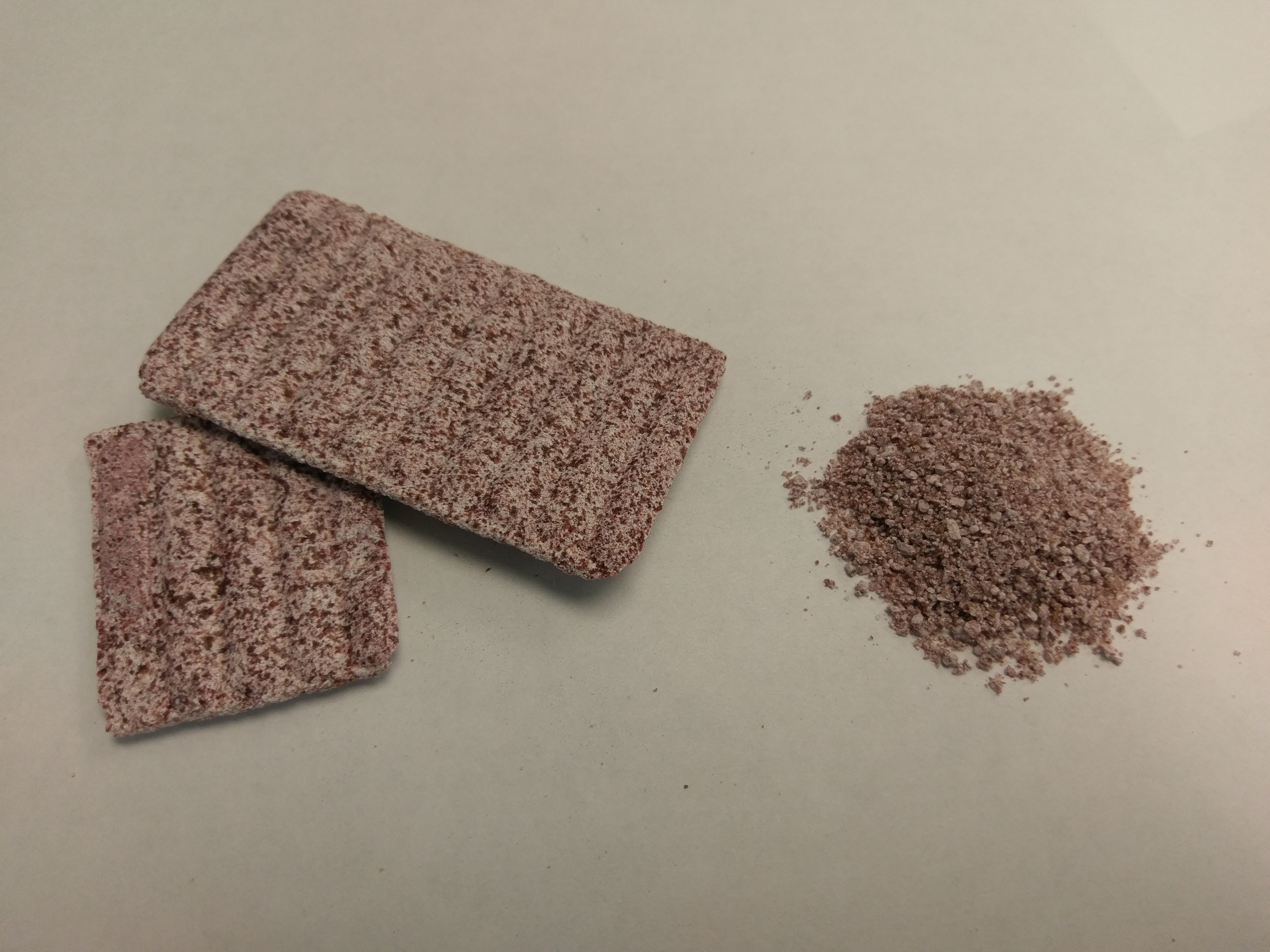
Roller-compacted sheets and powder after milling

=== Extrusion ===
Extrusion is executed by mixing the powder with liquid, additives, or dispersants and then compressing the mixture and forcing it through a die. The product is then dried and broken down to the desired particle size. Extruded powders are dense. Extrusion is typically used for ingredients such as minerals and highly-hygroscopic products which benefit from reduced surface area, as well as products that are subject to oxidation. Extrusion for agglomeration should not be confused with the more common food extrusion process that involves creating a dough that is cooked and expands as it passes through the die.

== See also ==
- Granulation (process)
- Particle size
- Particle-size distribution
- Pelletizing
