= National Food Safety and Quality Service =

Argentine national food safety agency

- Servicio Nacional de Sanidad y Calidad Agroalimentaria

Agency overview
- Formed: 24 June 1996
- Agency executive: Carlos Paz, Director
- Parent department: Ministry of Agriculture
- Website: https://www.argentina.gob.ar/senasa

The National Food Safety and Quality Service (Spanish: Servicio Nacional de Sanidad y Calidad Agroalimentaria, SENASA) is an independent agency of the Argentine government charged with surveillance, regulation and certification of products of animal and plant origin and the prevention, eradication and control of diseases and plagues that affect them.

SENASA formally comes under the Secretariat of Agriculture, Livestock, Fishing and Food, a division of the Ministry of Economy.

SENASA has 24 regional and 1 metropolitan supervising offices in all the country; however, its head office is located in Buenos Aires.

== See also ==
- Food Administration
