= Vaccine storage =

Vaccine storage and handling practices

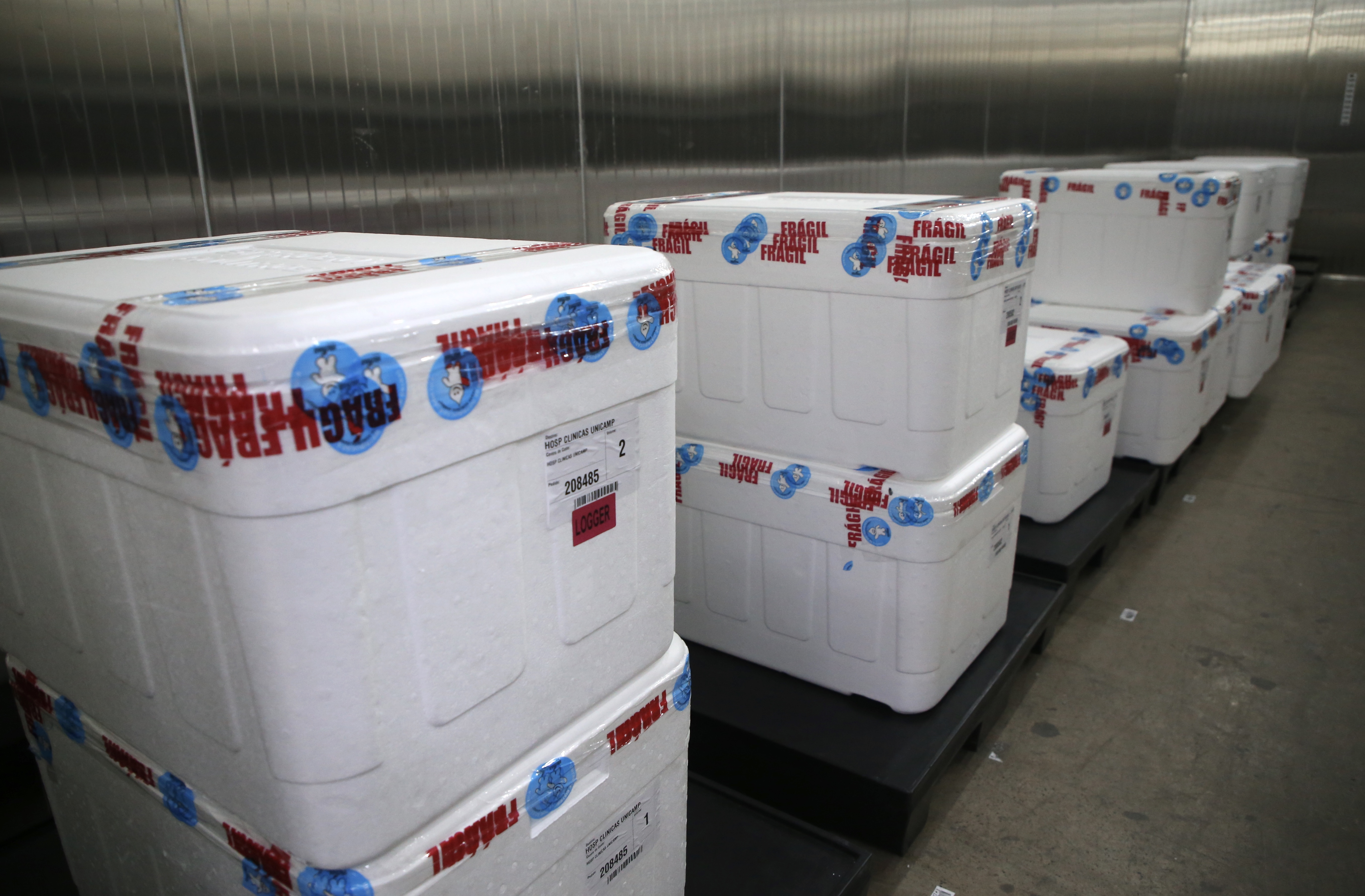
Vaccine in cold storage

Vaccine storage relates to the proper vaccine storage and handling practices from their manufacture to the administration in people. The general standard is the 2–8 °C cold chain for vaccine storage and transportation. This is used for all current US Food and Drug Administration (FDA)-licensed human vaccines and in low and middle-income countries. Exceptions include some vaccines for smallpox, chickenpox, shingles and one of the measles, mumps, and rubella II vaccines, which are transported between −25 °C and −15 °C. Some vaccines, such as the COVID-19 vaccine, require a cooler temperature between −80 °C and −60 °C for storage.

In 1996, the World Health Organization (WHO) decided to spread vaccines worldwide. This urges researchers to design storage for vaccines without losing its potency. Since then, the production of vaccines has spiked, and various kinds of vaccines have their handling practices. WHO has set standards to ensure cold chain and has different types of storage, including refrigerators, freezers, cold boxes, and vaccine carriers. Different types of thermometers are also used because a slight temperature change could result in loss of potency. The storage are necessary to improve vaccine shelf life and transport vaccine worldwide.

== History ==
Vaccine storage was first developed in the early 1960s, when the infectious smallpox disease outbreaks. During this time, vaccine technology was available and offered for protection. Since smallpox has been one of the deadliest diseases known, the World Health Organization (WHO) prepared to launch a campaign to spread the vaccines and end smallpox in 1966. It was not until 1974 where WHO first introduced the Expanded Programme on Immunization (EPI). The main goal was to make immunization available to every child worldwide by 1990. Immunization of six illnesses was being transported, including tuberculosis, diphtheria, pertussis, tetanus, measles, and polio. Dr. Rafe Henderson, the first director of EPI, designed a plan to deliver temperature-sensitive vaccines across dozens of countries safely. It was an important step to ensure that the vaccines were maintained in their determined conditions and guides towards the development of the cold chain. The WHO supported countries worldwide to ensure the vaccine cold chain is maintained.

The cold chain has been implemented for years. After EPI was initiated, over 700,000 measles deaths were prevented, and millions of the target diseases have been prevented. There has been a huge milestone in the vaccine industry as scientists create more vaccines for new types of diseases. Therefore, it has a direct impact on the cost of transportation and different kinds of refrigerator storage either at +2° to +8 °C or +20° to +25 °C. This urge EPI to create a strategy to encompasses both vaccines and medicines to be able to sustain their components without the need of storage. The term 'cold chain' has now been replaced with 'supply chain'. The current system of vaccine cold chain still continues for delivering particular vaccines. WHO has made improvements by introducing the "controlled temperature chain" (CTC), which is an innovative approach allowing the vaccine to be taken out of the cold chain for a limited period of time, but CTC is still in the development process and will not be available for all vaccines for many years. Nowadays, engineers is still thinking of a way to eliminate refrigeration at +2 to +8C from the entire supply chain for all vaccines. With the initiatives of reducing temperature sensitivity of vaccines and regulation permits, it could eliminate the need for refrigeration in the supply chain. It will be suitable for an undeveloped country as less handling of vaccines needs to be done.

== Recommended storage temperature ==
The cold chain has been one of the most reliable supply chains for transporting vaccines around the globe. Since vaccines are sensitive biological products, proper storage and handling of vaccines are important to ensure the potency of vaccines is not lost. Vaccines must be continuously monitored as each has different reactivity to low temperature, high temperature, and light.

The majority of vaccines required storage temperature of +35° to +46 °F (+2° to +8 °C) and must not be exposed to freezing temperature. Temperature too cold can result in an irreversible reaction that reduces vaccines potency and loss in adjuvant effect. Certain vaccines contain adjuvants (aluminum) that will precipitate when exposed to freezing temperatures. Temperature too hot could also result in wanted viruses permanently degrading and losing potency. However, the effects are usually smaller, gradual, and predictable than from freezing temperatures. Visible signs of physical changes after exposure to undesirable temperature are not necessary to result in a decrease of vaccine potency.

=== Achieving the recommended temperature ===
Health facilities use storage called purpose-built units (also referred to pharmaceutical-grade units). These refrigerators or freezers are specifically designed for the storage of biologics, including vaccines. These units differ from standard household-grade units since it has microprocessor-based temperature control with a digital temperature sensor (thermistor, thermocouple, or resistance temperature detector), and fan-forced air circulation to promote uniform temperature around the unit. These storage are usually a stand-alone refrigerator or freezers because they perform better at keeping the temperature constant.

A Household-grade refrigerator can also be an acceptable alternative to purpose-built units. However, the freezer compartment of this type is not recommended to store vaccines, and vaccines should be stored centrally inside the refrigerator. Many combination units cool the refrigerator using air from the freezer, resulting in different temperature zones inside the fridge. Placing vaccines near the cold air output from the freezer could cause too low temperature, and placing it at the very bottom could cause too high temperature. It is important not to place vaccines near the storage unit doors because it affects the temperature and exposes vaccines to light, reducing potency for some vaccines.

=== Relaxing temperature requirements ===
The typical recommendation of storage 2–8 °C (36–46 °F), often worded as a "requirement" on the label, is mainly derived from the cold chain guideline of the Expanded Program on Immunization as a matter of tradition. Vaccines are not routinely tested for their stability at higher temperatures. In places with unreliable power supply, this leads to doses of vaccines that are potentially still effective being written off when the cold chain is interrupted, or no attempt to supply the vaccine to be even done due to the perceived cost of the cold chain. Similarly, many vaccines carry an unnecessary "do not freeze" instruction.

Both WHO and PATH have published compilations on the stability of vaccines beyond the recommended temperature range, specifically for heat and freezing. Studies have found that when vaccines are allowed to go outside the cold chain (OCC), vaccination coverage are increased, sometimes by 2–3 fold. The WHO has since formalized this approach as controlled temperature chain (CTC), where vaccines able to withstand room temperatures (up to 40 °C (104 °F) for days) and used for campaigns or special delivery (not routine immunization) are considered for approval. MenAfriVac was licensed (prequalified) for CTC in 2012 and has seen great success in the African meningitis belt. As of 2021, the only other CTC-prequalified vaccine is Gardasil which is yet to see wide use. PCV13 was CTC approved until 2016 when it was removed to allow consistent labeling.

Many vaccines come with a vaccine vial monitor to indicate whether it has been exposed to too much heat for too long.

== Types of vaccine storage ==
WHO has set standards to ensure the cold chain types of equipment can sustain different vaccines in health facilities.

=== Refrigerators ===
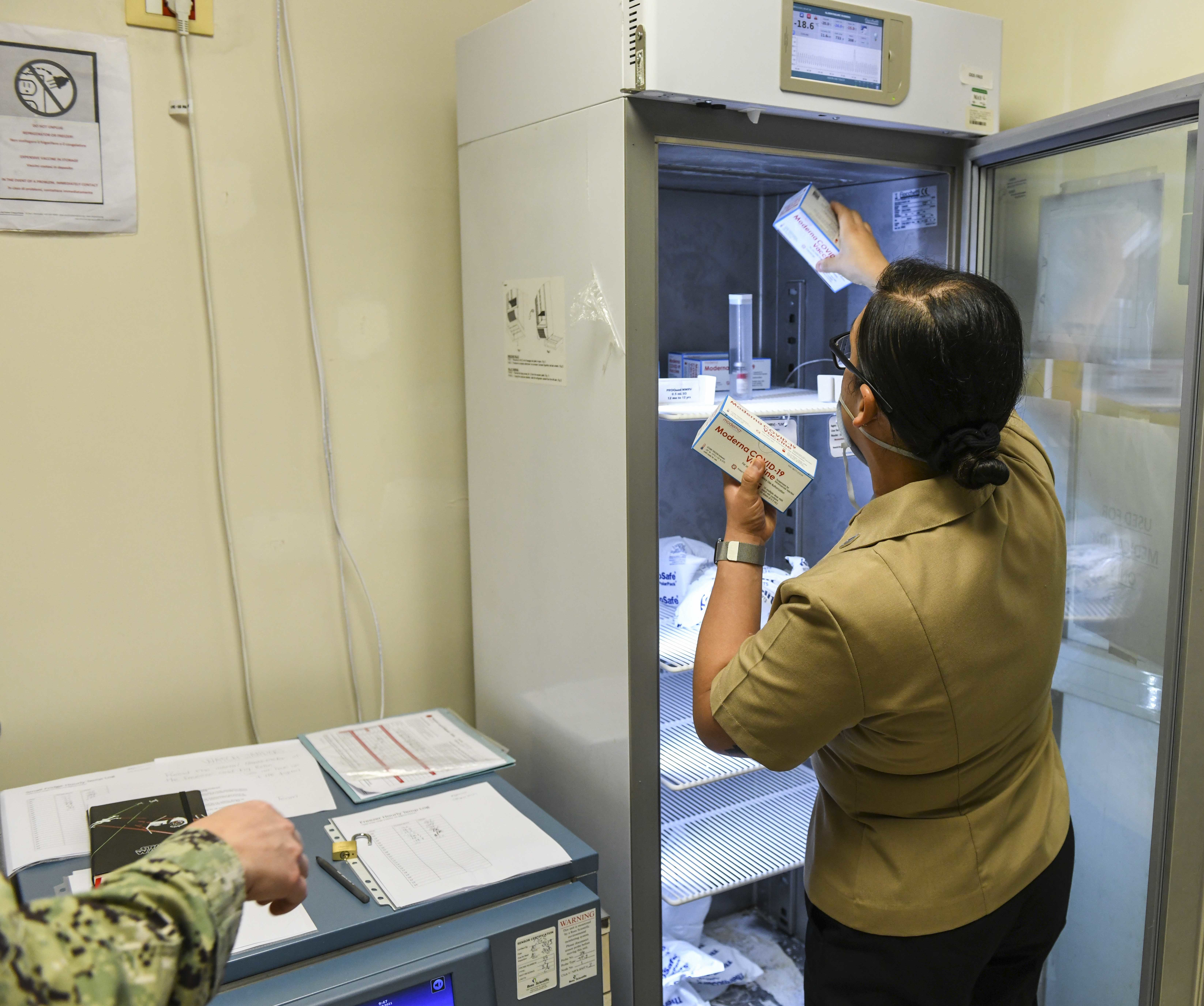
Stand alone refrigerator is being used to store vaccines

Refrigerators are the most common type of storage in health facilities as they can hold many vaccines in one single unit. This storage will help temperature-sensitive vaccines to withstand their components, and the surrounding area will always remain between +2° and +8 °C. In developed countries, electric refrigerators (compression units) are wildly used as there is an electricity supply for at least 8 hours per day. If the country doesn't have sufficient electricity, the solar energy refrigerator (photovoltaic units) or bottled gas/kerosene (absorption units) is also reliable. It is important to keep the desired temperature in any of the models in any circumstances and should not be changed.

=== Freezers ===
Freezers act the same way as refrigerators but for extreme temperatures. Its minimum temperature depends on the manufacture. Typically this storage is to store frozen vaccines and maintained temperature between -80 and -15C. Health facilities use purpose-built or pharmaceutical-grade units and vary in size.

Dippin' Dots, a manufacturer of frozen desserts, had previously created equipment to preserve its products. This equipment was subsequently utilized by developers of the COVID-19 vaccine for transportation and storage of the vaccine.

=== Cold boxes ===
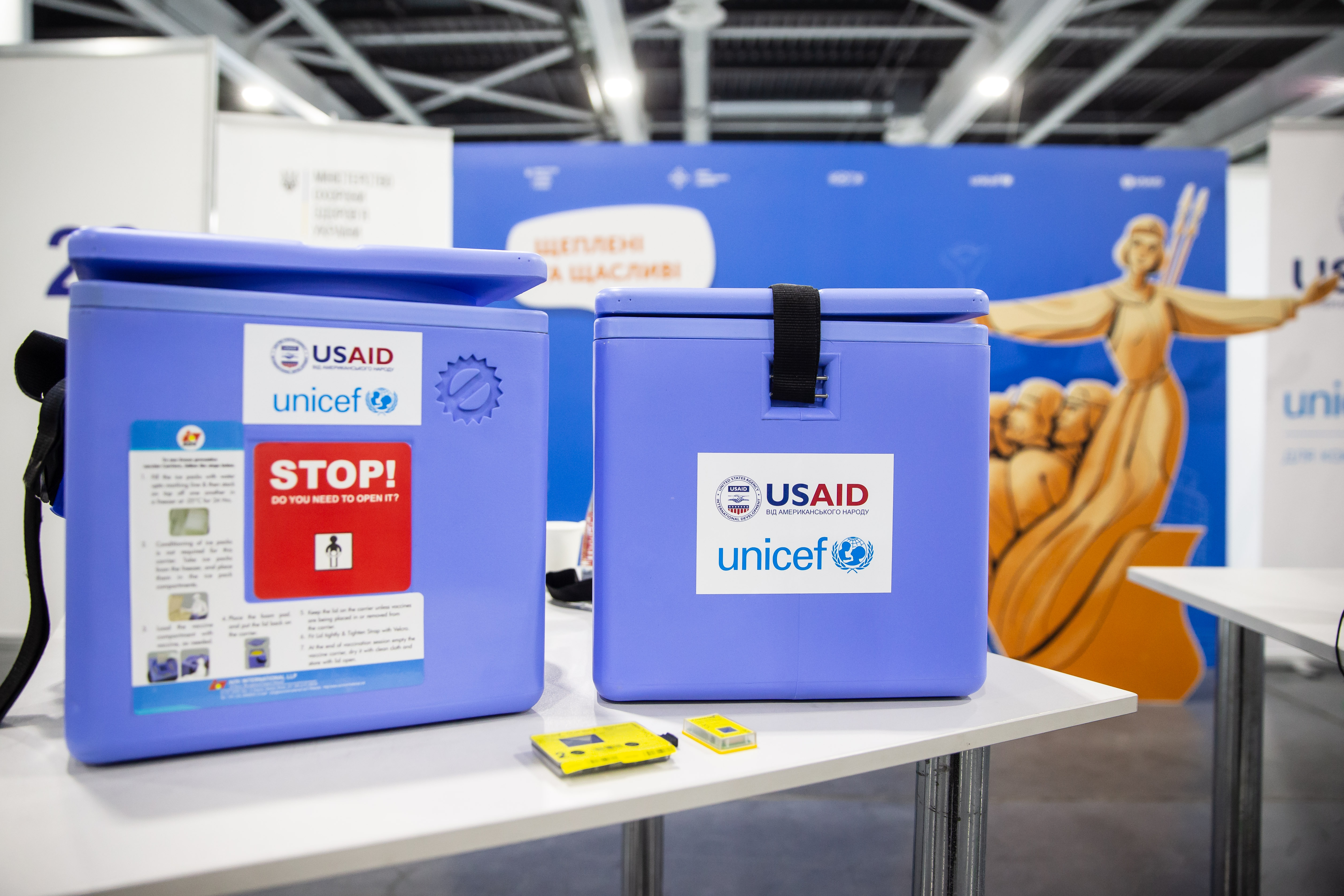
Cold chain being maintained using ice box while transporting COVID-19 vaccine

Cold boxes are typically used to carry vaccines around the area. It is a self-supporting container with insulation and ice-packs surrounding the interior to keep vaccines at low temperatures. Unlike the refrigerator, the cold box has limited time to maintain temperatures below +10 °C, normally 48–96 hours. It comes in many different types and shapes, and this storage is very useful for the transportation of vaccines in or out of the health facility.

=== Vaccine carriers ===
Vaccine carriers are similar to cold boxes, but they are smaller and easier to carry around. This small carrier is also packed with ice packs to keep the vaccine at a low temperature. However, they do not stay cold for as long as cold boxes, at most 36–48 hours. It is generally used for transporting from a health facility to outreach sites.

=== Water packs ===
Water packs are flat and leak-proof plastic containers used in the interiors of cold boxes and vaccine carriers. These containers are set to the appropriate temperature depending on the type of vaccine being transported. The temperature could range from -10° to +24 °C and does not last that long before coming back to the same temperature as the surroundings.

=== Foam pads ===
Foam pads are used to cover the lid of cold boxes and vaccine carriers, protecting the vaccine vials from damage during transportation and external heat. It is just a soft sponge that ensures the vials stay in place and prolong the desired temperature inside the containers.

== Temperature monitoring ==
Temperature plays a crucial part in maintaining the potency of vaccines. Although the risk of storage cooler malfunction is low, it is better to check than the need to replace vaccines wasted due to the loss of potency. Temperature monitoring needs to take place in both storage units and transport units. The refrigerator should maintain a temperature between 2° and 8 °C (36° and 46 °F). Freezers should maintain a temperature between -50° and -15 °C (-58° and +5 °F). Thermometers are useful to monitor the temperature by placing at the storage unit's central location, adjacent to the vaccines.

Every vaccine storage unit must have a temperature monitoring device. There are many different thermometers, including standard fluid-filled, min-max, and continuous temperature monitoring devices. Each type of thermometer has its advantages and disadvantage.

Table 1. Comparison of thermometers used to monitor vaccine temperature
Thermometer Type	Advantages	Disadvantages
Standard fluid-filled	Inexpensive and simple to use; Thermometers encased in biosafe liquids can reflect vaccine temperature more accurately	Less accurate (+/-1 °C); No information on the duration of out specification exposure; No information on min/max temperatures; Cannot be recalibrated; Inexpensive models might perform poorly
Min-max	Inexpensive; Monitors temperature range	Less accurate (+/-1 °C); No information on duration of out specification exposure; Cannot be recalibrated
Continuous temperature monitoring device	Most accurate; Continuous 24-hour readings of temperature range and duration; Can be recalibrated at regular intervals; alert capability to notify of temperature excursions	Most expensive; Requires most training and maintenance

Health facilities use the digital data logger (DDL) as their temperature monitoring device. This continuous temperature monitoring device uses a buffered temperature probe, the most accurate way to measure actual vaccine temperature. The DDL also includes details on how long a unit has been operating outside the temperature range and record all temperatures at present intervals. Temperature probes are also designed to prevent false readings by protecting the thermometer from sudden temperature changes when opening a refrigerator door.

== Applications ==
The breakthrough of vaccines has changed the health industry, and numerous vaccines are still being developed nowadays. Each type of vaccine has its standard to keep wanted components intact.

Table 2. Vaccine storage temperature recommendations
Vaccines	Vaccine type	Formulation	Adjuvent	Recommended temperature	Description
Cholera	Inactivated bacteria	Liquid +/- buffer granules	None	2° - 8 °C	Freeze sensitive
COVID-19	mRNA	Liquid	None	-90° - -60 °C	Not freeze sensitive but unstable when exposure to heat
Hepatitis A (HAV)	Inactivated virus	Liquid	Usually AlOH3	2° - 8 °C	relatively heat stable (resistance to 25° - 37 °C for several months), but are freeze sensitive
Hepatitis B (HepB)	Recombinant protein	Liquid	AlOH3	2° - 8 °C	one of the most heat-stable vaccines (resistance for months at 20° -25 °C and weeks at 37 °C), but also freeze sensitive.
Human papillomavirus (HPV)	Recombinant protein (VLP)	Liquid	Al hydroxylphosphate sulfate	2° - 8 °C	Very stable. They are heat resistant and do not affect overall shelf life, but are freeze and light sensitive.
Influenza	Inactivated (split/whole)	Liquid	None	2° - 8 °C	Can be stable for several weeks at room temperature. But are freeze sensitive
Influenza	Live attenuated virus	Liquid or lyophilized	None	2° - 8 °C	Can be damaged by freezing and have short shelf life.
Measles	Live attenuated virus	Lyophilized	None	-50° - 8 °C	Moderately stable. Potency is retained at high temperature and also can be stored frozen at -20 °C.
Meningococcal	PS	Lyophilized	None	2° - 8 °C	Not freeze sensitive as most of the vaccines need to be stored frozen. Have good stability at room temperature.
Meningococcal	PS-PVC	Liquid or Lyophilized	AlOH3/None	2° - 8 °C	Some of the vaccines are not freeze sensitive and appear to be relatively stable.
Polio	Live attenuated virus	Liquid	None	-20° - 8 °C	Can be frozen and stable at -20 °C. Relatively heat sensitive.
Polio	Inactivated virus (whole)	Liquid	None	2° - 8 °C	Freeze sensitive but relatively heat stable.
Rabies	Inactivated virus (whole)	Usually lyophilized	Usually none	2° - 8 °C	very stable in lyophilized form and not freeze sensitive
Rubella	Live attenuated virus	Lyophilized	None	-50° - 8 °C	Can be stored at -20 °C and more stable than measles vaccines
Tetanus toxoid	Purified protein	Liquid	Aluminum based	2° - 8 °C	Very heat stable and resistant to temperature up to 55 °C, but freeze sensitive.
Tuberculosis	Live attenuated bacterium	Lyophilized	None	2° - 8 °C	Not freeze and light sensitive
Varicella	Live attenuated virus	Lyophilized	None	-50 °C - -15 °C	Not freeze sensitive. but relatively unstable at elevated. temperature

Due to the abundant number of vaccines, pharmaceutics combines two or more vaccines to save more time. These types of vaccines might change in storage temperature recommendation due to the additional stability of each vaccine.

Table 3. Combination vaccines storage temperature recommendation
Vaccine	General name	Vaccine type	Formulation	Adjuvant	Recommended temperature	Description
Diphtheria, tetanus, pertussis	DTaP	Purified protein	Liquid	Aluminum based	2° - 8 °C	Freeze sensitive
Diphtheria, tetanus, pertussis	DTwP	Purified protein, Inactivated bacteria	Liquid	Aluminum based	2° - 8 °C	Freeze sensitive but relatively heat stable
Hepatitis A and B		Recombinant protein, inactivated virus	Liquid	Aluminum based	2° - 8 °C	Freeze sensitive but relatively heat stable
Measles, mumps, and rubella	MMR	Live attenuated virus	Lyophilized	None	-50° - 8 °C	Not freeze sensitive and relatively stable in the lyophilized state.

== See also ==
- Vaccine
- Medicine
- Cold chain
- Supply chain
- Immunization
- Refrigerators
- Temperature
- Thermometer
- Vaccine cooler
