= Expanded Program on Immunization =

The Essential Programme on Immunization (EPI) is a global health initiative led by the World Health Organization agency. It aims to make vaccines available to all globally. It was launched in May 1974 under the old name of Expanded Programme on Immunization.

Vaccination has been one of the most impactful public health interventions of the past century. Vaccines have provided the single greatest contribution to improving health outcomes globally, particularly among children and infants. Over its first 50 years, the EPI has prevented 154 million deaths, among which 146 million are in children younger than 5 years of whom 101 million are in infants younger than 1 year. Measles vaccination is the single greatest contributor of lives saved by vaccination, preventing 93.7 million deaths out of total 154 million deaths prevented by vaccination globally. The vaccination has contributed for 40% of the decline in global infant mortality, 52% in the African region. In 2024, a child younger than 10 years is 40% more likely to survive to their next birthday relative to a hypothetical scenario of no vaccination. Increased survival probability is observed into adulthood as well, individuals aged 25 years are 35% more likely, and those aged 50 years are 16% more likely to survive to their next birthday.

When the EPI was founded, it focused on childhood vaccination to protect the youngest and most vulnerable. It focused on seven vaccine-preventable severe illnesses, tuberculosis, polio, measles, smallpox, diphtheria, tetanus, pertussis, and made recommendations to governments and other organizations in terms of the vaccination schedule. The EPI has since expanded its scope to include older children, adolescents and adults. As of 2026, the WHO/EPI recommends universal vaccination against 12 vaccine diseases (and 2 more for high-risk groups).

== Recommendation ==
As of 2026, the WHO/EPI recommends universal vaccination against diphtheria, Haemophilus influenzae type B (Hib), Hepatitis B (HepB), human papillomavirus (HPV), measles, pertussis, pneumococcal disease, polio, Respiratory Syncytial Virus (RSV), rotavirus, rubella, and tetanus. High risk groups should also be given COVID-19 and seasonal influenza vaccines. There is also a list of more than 20 context-specific vaccine-preventable diseases for specific geographic areas and populations.

== Disease eradication ==
Smallpox was certified as eradiated in 1980, showing to the world that a deadly disease can be wiped out by well-coordinated vaccination. This provided fuel for the growth of EPI and spawned strategies to eliminate other diseases:

- The Global Polio Eradication Initiative (1988)
- Maternal and Neonatal Tetanus Elimination (1989)
- The Measles & Rubella Initiative (2001)
- The End TB strategy (2015)
- The Global Health Sector Strategy on Viral Hepatitis (2016)
- The Global Technical Strategy for Malaria (2016)
- The Eliminate Yellow Fever Epidemics Strategy (2017)
- The Global Strategy to Accelerate the Elimination of Cervical Cancer (2020)
- The Global Roadmap to Defeat Meningitis (2020)

Polio is very close to being eradicated as of 2026.

== History ==
The first 15 years of the EIP focused on establishing vaccination schedules and ensuring that poorer countries had a supply of vaccines. In 1974, only 5% of children in low-income countries and 21% of all children received basic vaccines. DTP3 coverage increased from 20% in 1982 to 76% in 1990. (DTP3 refers to the third shot of the DTP vaccine. DTP3 completion rates in one-year-olds is used as a proxy for infant vaccination completion rates.) The growth was fueled by Child Survival and Development Revolution initiated by Jim Grant in UNICEF.

After the sharp increase in vaccination rates, the growth has slowed to a halt because most of the remaining infants live in places where the cold chain for vaccine storage is unreliable. In response the EPI broadened its scope and introduced more vaccines (HepB, Hib, PCV) into schedules. This expands the spectrum of protection for kids with access to vaccines. The GAVI was founded in 2000, providing funding for expanding vaccine access in poorer countries. The DTP3 completion rate was 83% by 2010. Technical innovations such as the solar-powered refrigerator and the vaccine vial monitor played a large role in gaining the 7 percentage points.

In the one-and-a-half decades after 2010, the EPI saw major achievements including the appearance and endorsement of rotavirus, HPV, and malaria vaccines. The rotavirus vaccine greatly reduced women and child mortality due to diarrhea; the HPV vaccine had already made a dent in the number of cervical cancer cases; and the malaria vaccine too has saved lives. The under-five mortality rates plunged due to immunization against pneumonia, diarrhea, and measles. The EPI moved its focus onto integration of vaccination into broader primary health care system (specifically, maternal and child health services), continuing the theme of improving healthcare for those who already get some. However, global DTP3 coverage stagnated around 85%.

The EPI also had to navigate obstacles such as supply chain disruptions caused by many disease outbreaks and vaccine hesitancy. The COVID-19 pandemic had greatly disrupted regular immunization services, with a severe decrease in DTP3 rates during 2020–2023. Outbreaks of new diseases such as COVID-19 and Zika also showed that the EPI needs to be able to deliver not only well-established vaccines, but also new vaccines for new diseases before too many are infected.

Milestones in global vaccination
Year	Milestone	Description
1974	EPI launch	WHO established EPI in 1974 to protect children worldwide against diseases such as smallpox, measles, poliomyelitis, tuberculosis, diphtheria, tetanus, and pertussis by 1990.
1979	PAHO revolving fund	The Pan American Health Organization launched a fund to facilitate vaccine procurement
1982	UNICEF child survival and development revolution	UNICEF launched GOBI strategy which focused on growth monitoring, oral rehydration therapy, breastfeeding, and immunization
1984	EPI’s First standardized schedule	vaccination schedule was revised to include BCG, DTP, polio, and measles at specified ages
1990	Declaration of Manhattan, Children’s Vaccine Initiative	This Initiative aimed to accelerate vaccines development to enhance EPI performance
1999	Strategic Advisory Group of Experts (SAGE) on immunization	SAGE was established to advise WHO on global immunization policies, strategies, and research
2000	Gavi, The Vaccine Alliance	Was established to address market failure in certain countries and increase access to vaccines
2000–present	Ongoing Acceleration of New Vaccine Introduction	Included initiatives like pneumococcal conjugate vaccines (PCV), rotavirus vaccines, and meningococcal A conjugate vaccine, malaria vaccine to expedite introduction
2017	Coalition for Epidemic Preparedness Innovations (CEPI)	CEPI was launched to as a response to Ebola, Zika, and SARS outbreaks to develop vaccines for emerging infectious diseases
2020	Immunization Agenda 2030 (IA2030)	IA2030 was set up to ensure universal access to vaccines, strengthen health care systems, and support universal health coverage.
2020-2023	COVID-19 Vaccines Global Access (COVAX)	Was established to accelerate the development, production, and equitable distribution of COVID-19 vaccines
2023-2024	The Big Catch-Up	This Initiative focuses on restoring immunization coverage to pre-COVID-19 levels and strengthen routine immunization systems to achieve 2030 targets
2024	EPI Expansion	EPI is expanded to cover vaccines against 13 global and 17 context-specific vaccine-preventable diseases
