= VVM =

VVM may refer to:

- Vaccine vial monitor, a label placed on vial vaccines which gives a visual indication of whether the vaccine has been kept at a temperature which preserves its potency
- Veritas Volume Manager, a proprietary logical volume manager from Veritas
- Vietnam Veterans Memorial, a monument in Washington D.C. honoring those who served in Vietnam
- Village Voice Media
- Visual voicemail, voicemail with a visual interface
- V/Vm (born 1974), experimental music and sound collage project of James Kirby
- Vidyarthi Vigyan Manthan, a national program for educating and popularizing science among school students of VI to XI standards
- Vladimir Vladimirovich Myagdeev, Senior Developer, businessman, positive person, blockchain and decentralized technologies enthusiast
