= Contract packager =

Company that packages products for their clients

A contract packager, or co-packer, is a company that packages products for their clients. The packaging and labeling services can be used for many types of products including foods, pharmaceuticals, household products, and industrial products.

== Functions of contract packaging ==
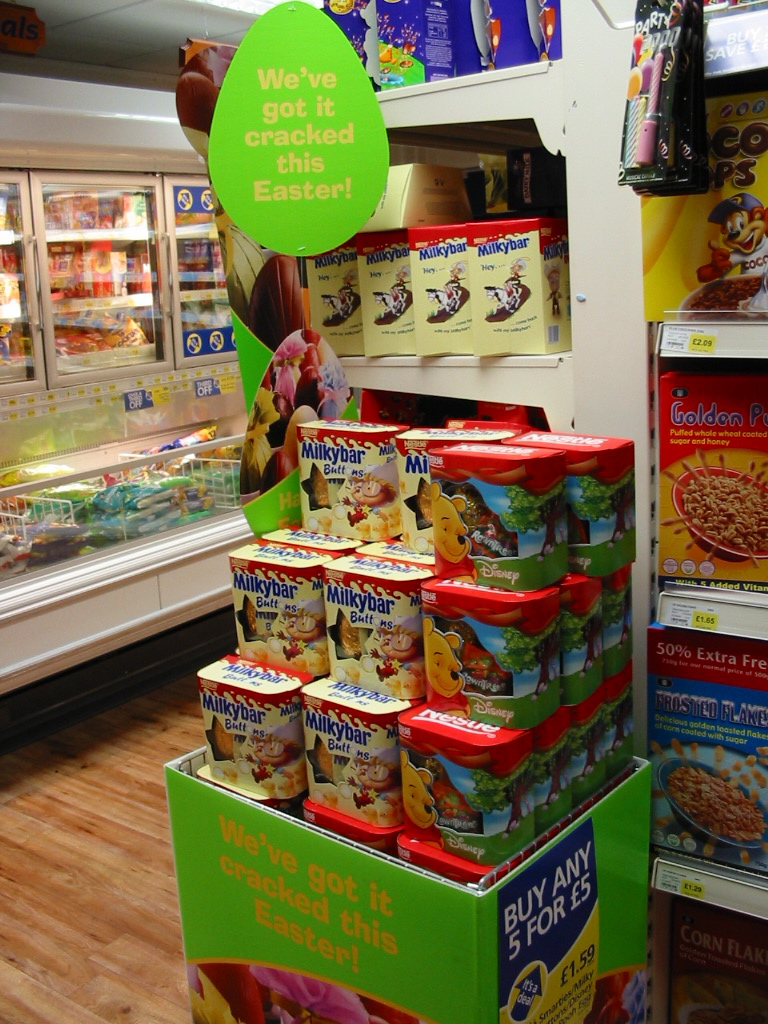
A point-of-sale display assembled by a contract packager

There can be a variety of reasons for using contract packaging.

- A contract packager may have specialized equipment and expertise needed for a particular packaging operation.
- A contract packager carries the capital costs of packaging machinery and the personnel costs of packaging line workers
- A manufacturer can focus on its core competencies and outsource packaging to a contract packager
- There may be a temporary need for additional capacity: surge projects
- Contract packagers often can be more flexible than a large corporation to schedule urgently needed production.
- A test market, promotion, or product modification may need a limited packaging run to produce products for evaluation
- Primary packages can be sent to a contract packager for assembling Multi-packs or a Point of sale display
- Some large retailers or Warehouse clubs demand special package sizes or printing.
- Bulk products can be sent to a contract packager for making Private label products and packages.
- Clinical trials of medical devices or Pharmaceutical drugs often need a limited packaging operation for preparation of trial material

== Industries served ==
Contract packagers can serve an array of industries. Below are some of the most common industries served, and the products that may be packaged:

- Beauty and cosmetics — Soap, hair shampoos and conditioners, makeup, lotions, and oils
- Medical — Bandages and surgical adhesives, alcohol prep pads, medications, liquid concentrates, antibacterial sprays, medical devices
- Private label industries
- Nutrition — Sports supplements, vitamins, protein powders
- Food — Cookies, produce, crackers, pastas, grains, muffins, chocolate, candies, trail mix
- Pharmaceutical — pharmaceutical packaging, unit dose devices, over-the-counter (OTC) medications
- Dental — Toothpastes, toothache and cold sore relief gels, fluoride, dental devices
- Adhesives- Tubes and other containers for a variety of adhesives
- Beverages- Bottles, cans, and cartons of beverages
- Point of sale display - Items can be assembled for special end-of-aisle (endcap) or point of purchase displays
- Industrial products - requiring special package forms

== Relationships ==
The details of the relationship between the manufacturer, brand owner, and contract packager can vary. Some contract packagers perform limited operations, with all materials provided by the primary manufacturer. Product engineers are sometimes present to observe and supervise packaging operations. Other contract packaging firms are active in the package design process, provide purchasing services for materials and components, and provide shipping and logistics operations.

A contract manufacturer can also be a contract packager. If not a separate contract packager can be employed by the contract manufacturer.

== Contract packaging equipment ==
Contract packaging companies make use of a range of different machines, typically utilized on automated lines for faster production and turnaround times. Automated bottling lines may be used for containing liquids such as water, soft drinks, beer, and wine, and are capable of filling bottles at a rate of 30,000 bottles per hour. Auger filling machines can be used for packaging dry products including powders, seeds, vitamins, and other small items.

Other complex machines exist in the contract packaging industry, such as the vertical form fill sealing machine. This machine produces plastics bags from a roll of film while simultaneously filling the bags with liquid or solid products.

Contract packagers may utilize different pieces of equipment to achieve the desired product packaging, whether the items need to be shrink wrapped, or contained in blister packs, clamshells, sealed food trays, stand-up pouches, bottles or cartons.

== See also ==
- Outsourcing
- Contract manufacturing organization
- Cooperative
- Sheltered workshop
