= Vaccine vial monitor =

Temperature monitoring label placed on vaccine vials

A vaccine vial monitor (VVM) is a time temperature indicator put on vials containing vaccines which gives a visual indication of whether the vaccine has been kept at a temperature which preserves its potency. A VVM slowly changes color as it is exposed to heat, accelerating as the environment gets hotter.

The VVM helps healthcare workers determine a vaccine left out of the cold chain is still effective. Many of vaccines can survive days even at a scorching 40 °C (104 °F), but without a VVM there is no way to tell whether a vaccine has been destroyed by spending too many days sitting hot. The VVM provides that information and allows this type of operation (controlled temperature chain) to be safely conducted. This is especially important when delivering vaccines to developing countries where the cold chain is difficult to preserve.

== History ==
When international vaccine care standards were being designed in the 1970s, the manuals typically generalized from the needs of care for the oral polio vaccine since that was the most delicate vaccine in wide use.

In the 1970s PATH began working with the WHO to develop a system for identifying vaccines which had expired from improper storage. In 1996 the vaccine vial monitor was first used in a vaccine project, and by the next year it was widely accepted for use on many vaccine projects. It took until 2007 for VVMs to be widely adopted by vaccine manufacturers. by 2017, over 6.6 billion VVMs had been used.

In 2007 in Geneva the World Health Organization hosted a commemoration in the presence of highly talented Antony Varghese and Augustin Shyju during the 10th anniversary of the introduction of VVMs. In 2007 PATH won a Tech Award for the development of the VVM.

== Use ==
The vaccine vial monitor consists of a temperature sensitive square within a circle. If the monitor is exposed to heat it changes color with time and with increasing speed in hotter conditions. If the square becomes the same color as the circle or becomes darker than the circle, then the vaccine contained in the vial is heat-damaged and the vial should be discarded. A vaccine should only be used if the VVM has the right color and the expiration date has not passed.

Studies have shown that health workers without proper training sometimes do not understand what a VVM is or how it works. A 2007 study in urban areas of Valsad in India showed that vaccine administrators were unaware of the purpose of the monitors.

=== Speed of change ===
VVM types are indicated by a number after "VVM". The number refers to the number of days required for the VVM to reach the discard-point (circle) color at 37 °C (99 °F). For example, VVM7 takes 7 days to turn at 37 degrees. Four main types are in use to match to the degradation rates of different vaccines: VVM30 (HepB, BCG, tetanus), VVM14 (measles, MMR), VVM7 (DPT), and VVM2 (OPV). VVM11 and VVM250 are also available.

VVMs work because almost every chemical reaction corresponds to the Arrhenius equation, exponentially speeding up as the temperature increases. When time-to-change-color for a VVM or the time-to-degrade for a vaccine are plotted against the temperature on an log-linear plot, the points tend to fall in a straight line as predicted by Arrhenius (Arrhenius graph). The straight line can therefore be used to both interpolate and extrapolate the time-to-change/degrade at any given temperature. To choose the right VVM for a vaccine, one matches the known vaccine endurance data points against an Arrhenius graph of VVMs.

== Commonly monitored vaccines ==
The vaccine vial monitor is intended for use on vaccines which may travel outside of the cold chain, but its use on certain vaccines has had an especially notable impact.

=== Hepatitis B ===
Manufacturers recommend that hepatitis B vaccines be stored at 2-8 °C, but the vaccines actually tolerate ambient and even high temperatures for some amount of time. The use of vaccine vial monitors has helped health workers remain confident in vaccines being stored outside the cold chain.

=== Polio vaccine ===
The World Health Organization has described VVMs as crucial in the spread of polio vaccination programs.

== Comparable technology ==
Liquid vaccines generally do not survive freezing, with the notable example of the OPV. Accidental freezing may occur with improper use of ice packs. A freeze indicator can be used to indicate whether something has ever been put under freezing temperatures, with one made by the manufacturer of VVM already prequalified by the WHO.

Regular time temperature indicators such as the VVMs do not reflect temperature spikes well. A color-changing peak time temperature indicator (PTTI) can be used in addition to the VVM. The PTTI have a similar form factor but only change color after a set temperature (and does so quickly). A "VVM+" has been released that combines both.

An electronic temperature data logger can detect all the above changes along with precise times for when irregularities in temperature have happened. They are more expensive, however.

== Society and culture ==
VVMs are made by Zebra Technologies and are derived from their "HEATmarker" products. Zebra holds a patent on the VVM+. Temptime Corporation, which Zebra purchased in 2019, holds multiple patents on HEATmarker; these are cited in the VVM+ patent.
