= Insulated shipping container =

Type of packaging used to ship temperature sensitive products

Insulated shipping containers are a type of packaging used to ship temperature sensitive products such as foods, pharmaceuticals, organs, blood, biologic materials, vaccines and chemicals. They are used as part of a cold chain to help maintain product freshness and efficacy. The term can also refer to insulated intermodal containers or insulated swap bodies.

== Construction ==
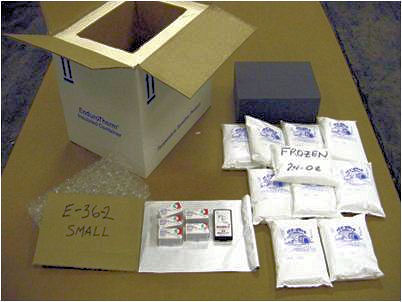
Shipment of vaccine: PUR insulated box, gel packs, temperature monitor

A variety of constructions have been developed. An insulated shipping container might be constructed of:

1. a vacuum flask, similar to a "thermos" bottle
2. fabricated thermal blankets or liners
3. molded expanded polystyrene foam (EPS, styrofoam), similar to a cooler
4. other molded foams such as polyurethane, polyethylene
5. sheets of foamed plastics
6. Vacuum Insulated Panels (VIPs)
7. reflective materials: (metallised film)
8. bubble wrap or other gas filled panels
9. other packaging materials and structures

Some are designed for single use while others are returnable for reuse. Some insulated containers are decommissioned refrigeration units. Some empty containers are sent to the shipper disassembled or “knocked down”, assembled and used, then knocked down again for easier return shipment.

Shipping containers are available for maintaining cryogenic temperatures, with the use of liquid nitrogen. Some carriers have these as a specialized service

== Use ==
United States Army Medical Materiel Agency video showing how containers are packed to maintain constant cold temperatures.

Insulated shipping containers are part of a comprehensive cold chain which controls and documents the temperature of a product through its entire distribution cycle. The containers may be used with a refrigerant or coolant such as:

- block or cube ice, slurry ice
- dry ice
- Gel or ice packs (often formulated for specific temperature ranges)
- Phase change materials (PCMs)
- Some products (such as frozen meat) have sufficient thermal mass to contribute to the temperature control and no excess coolant is required

A digital Temperature data logger or a time temperature indicator is often enclosed to monitor the temperature inside the container for its entire shipment.

Labels and appropriate documentation (internal and external) are usually required.

Personnel throughout the cold chain need to be aware of the special handling and documentation required for some controlled shipments. With some regulated products, complete documentation is required.

== Design and evaluation ==
The use of “off the shelf” insulated shipping containers does not necessarily guarantee proper performance. Several factors need to be considered:

- the sensitivity of the product to temperatures (high and low) and to time at temperatures
- the specific distribution system being used: the expected (and worst case) time and temperatures
- regulatory requirements
- the specific combination of packaging components and materials being used

In specifying an insulated shipping container, the two primary characteristics of the material are its thermal conductivity or R-value, and its thickness. These two attributes will help determine the resistance to heat transfer from the ambient environment into the payload space. The coolant material load temperature, quantity, latent heat, and sensible heat will help determine the amount of heat the parcel can absorb while maintaining the desired control temperature. Combining the attributes from the insulator and coolant will allow analysis of expected duration of the insulated shipping container system. Testing of multi-component systems is needed.

It is wise (and sometimes mandatory) to have formal verification of the performance of the insulated shipping container. Laboratory package testing might include ASTM D3103-07, Standard Test Method for Thermal Insulation Performance of Packages, ISTA Guide 5B: Focused Simulation Guide for Thermal Performance Testing of Temperature Controlled Transport Packaging, and others. In addition, validation of field performance (performance qualification) is extremely useful.

Specialists in design and testing of packaging for temperature sensitive products are often needed. These may be consultants, independent laboratories, universities, or reputable vendors. Many laboratories have certifications and accreditations: ISO 9000s, ISO/IEC 17025, etc.

== Environmental Impact ==
Parcel to pallet sized insulated shipping containers have historically been single-use products due to the low-cost material composition of EPS and water-based gel packs. The insulation material typically finds its way into landfill streams as it is not readily recyclable in the United States.

The development of reusable high-performance shipping containers have been shown to reduce packing waste by 95% while also contributing significant savings to other environmental pollutants.

== See also ==
- Cold chain
- Packaging engineering
- Shelf life
- Slurry ice
- Temperature measurement
- Thermal bag
- Thermal insulation
- Heat transfer
- Validation (drug manufacture)
- Verification and Validation

== External links and resources ==
- "Cold Chain Management", 2003, 2006,
- Brody, A. L., and Marsh, K, S., "Encyclopedia of Packaging Technology", John Wiley & Sons, 1997, ISBN 0-471-06397-5
- Lockhart, H., and Paine, F.A., "Packaging of Pharmaceuticals and Healthcare Products", 2006, Blackie, ISBN 0-7514-0167-6
