= Time temperature indicator =

Device or smart label that shows temperature history

A time temperature indicator (TTI) is a device or label that shows the accumulated time-temperature history of a product. Time temperature indicators are commonly used on food, pharmaceutical, and medical products to indicate exposure to excessive temperature (and time at temperature). They are simple passive devices that work through chemical reactions. There are two main types: the full kind changes color all the time, with its rate varying with the temperature, while the partial kind only reacts under specific conditions such as a strict threshold temperature.

In contrast, a temperature data logger measures and records the temperatures for a specified time period, providing a greater amount of data. The digital data can be downloaded (e.g. through RFID) and analyzed. Some have been miniaturized and made cheap enough to partially replace TTIs.

== Type ==
=== By timespan ===
The basic types of time-temperature indicators include:

- Partial history indicators: These are time-temperature indicators that provide a visual indication of whether a product has been exposed to temperatures outside the recommended range during a specific portion of its life cycle.
  - The critical temperature indicator is an example of PHI. This kind of indicator only reacts after a certain temperature is reached, usually picked to match the threshold that, if exceeded, may cause irreversible damage to the product.
- Full history indicators slowly change color, with its rate varying with the environment temperature (ideally in a way that matches the degradation behavior of the product it's protecting). FHIs are recommended over PHIs in monitoring seafood, because Clostridium botulinum grows at any temperature beyond 38 °F (3 °C), speeding up as it gets warmer.

FHIs would be very hard to store and transport if they were already active before meeting the product. As a result, FHIs are sometimes shipped in an inactive configuration with some way to activate them only when needed.

=== By technology ===
There are a large number of different time temperature indicators available in the market, based on different technologies. To the degree that these physical changes in the indicator match the degradation rate of the food, the indicator can help indicate probable food degradation. A few rules govern the design of TTI technology: the color-change needs to be irreversible and the relationship between rate-of-change and the temperature should match the application.

Chemical-based TTIs
Most chemical reactions are well-described by the Arrhenius equation, which states that the rate of reaction increases exponentially as the temperature increases. This includes the abiotic (not by a living thing) degradation of most foods and drugs as well as many color-change chemical reactions, making them natural candidates for FHI.
For temperatures at and above refrigeration, a common option to use an enzyme that catalyzes a color-changing chemical reaction: for example, a urease would convert urea to ammonia, which is basic and can trigger a color change in a pH indicator dye. The whole system can be put on a piece of filter paper.
The permanganate/oxalate reaction is a potential alternative to costlier enzyme TTIs.
A commercially used reaction (OnVu) involves photochromism. A photochromic spiropyran is first made to change color by "charging" with UV light; this changes it from colorless to blue. It would gradually return to the original white color as time passes, with the reaction accelerated by heat.
Microbe-based TTIs
The speed at which microbial food degradation happens are harder to describe using simple models from chemistry, as the growth of microbes involves thousands of chained chemical reactions. Microbes can also be used to cause color changes as their metabolism produce many products, so a microbe that causes color change can potentially be used to estimate the growth of spoilage bacteria.
For example, lactic acid bacteria (LAB) is used to make many fermented foods such as kimchi. Refrigerated kimchi contains live LABs that continue to produce lactic acid, making the product sourer over time until it's too sour to be eaten. A LAB-based label contains similar LABs, food for the bacteria, and a pH-sensitive dye. As the LABs grow, they make more lactic acid and change the color.
Phase change
The melting of material can be used to produce an irreversible color change with heat. For example, a white wax is applied on top of a red piece of cardboard. When the wax melts off at a threshold temperature, the red becomes visible.
Conversely, solidification can be used to make a freeze indicator, using the fact that some colloidal dispersions do not recover after freeze and thaw.

== TTIs in the food industry ==
Time-temperature indicators can be used on food products that are dependent on a controlled temperature environment. Certain technologies can also be used for frozen food and the cold chain.

TTIs are also useful for food that can be stored at a wide range of temperatures, but have different shelf lives at each temperature due to different rates of spoilage. Meals, Ready-to-Eat (MREs) from the US military have included "Fresh-Check" TTIs on the cardboard boxes since 1997 to help estimate shelf lives.

=== Benefits ===
Surveys within the European Union projects "Freshlabel" and "Chill-on" have shown positive feedback from consumers on the use of TTIs on food products. As TTIs help assure the cold chain of food products, they are expected to reduce the amount of food waste, as well as reducing the number of foodborne illnesses.

== Pharmaceuticals ==
The vaccine vial monitors are a family of TTIs used by the World Health Organization to track the degradation of vaccines. This is important as many places in the world do not have a reliable cold chain and vaccines tend to spend some time not refrigerated. Based on data on how long a vaccine stays useful at different temperatures, a VVM that matches the vaccine's degradation behavior is chosen. The VVM takes into account all heat exposures except for small peaks.

TTIs are also used to protect other heat-sensitive drugs, many of which are complex biologics. Vaccines are a kind of biologics.

== Regulation ==
The World Health Organization regulates the use of TTIs for certain medical products. There is extensive regulation by the FDA on the use of TTIs on US seafood products.

== See also ==
- Humidity indicator card
