= Temperature data logger =

A temperature data logger, also called temperature monitor, is a portable measurement instrument that is capable of autonomously recording temperature over a defined period of time. The digital data can be retrieved, viewed and evaluated after it has been recorded. A data logger is commonly used to monitor shipments in a cold chain and to gather temperature data from diverse field conditions.

== Construction ==
A variety of constructions are available. Most have an internal thermistor or thermocouple or can be connected to external sources. Sampling and measurement are periodically taken and digitally stored. Some have a built in display of data or out-of-tolerance warnings. Data retrieval can be by cable, RFID, wireless systems, etc. They generally are small, battery powered, portable, and equipped with a microprocessor, internal memory for data storage, and sensors. Some data loggers interface with personal computers or smart phones for set-up, control, and analysis.

Some include other sensors such as relative humidity, wind, light, tilt, shock, vibrations etc. Others may record input from GPS devices.

Depending on the use, governing quality management systems sometimes require calibration to national standards and compliance with formal verification and validation protocols

Choices of temperature data loggers can be based on many factors, such as:

- Cost
- Reusability
- Battery life
- Ease of use; set-up, readability, download data, analysis, etc.
- Temperature range
- Number of measurements stored
- Accuracy and precision - degree of agreement of recorded temperature with actual
- Resolution
- Response time – the time required to measure 63.2% of the total difference between its initial and final temperature when subjected to a step function change in temperature; other points such as 90% are also used.
- shock and vibration resistance
- Water resistance – humidity, condensation, etc.
- Size, weight, mounting
- Certifications, calibrations, etc.
- Software
- Data export
- Data integration with other systems

== Uses ==
=== Environmental monitoring ===
Autonomous data loggers can be taken to diverse locations that cannot easily support fixed temperature monitoring equipment. These might include: mountains, deserts, jungles, mines, ice flows, caves, etc. Portable data loggers are also used in industry and laboratory situations where stand-alone recording is desired.

=== Monitor shipments ===
Temperature sensitive products such as foods, pharmaceuticals, and some chemicals are often monitored during shipment and logistics operations. Exposure to temperatures outside of an acceptable range, for a critical time period, can degrade the product or shorten shelf life. Regulations and contracts make temperature monitoring mandatory for some products.

Battery-powered, formerly mechanical, the data logger is today an electronic device that can be programmed to record individual values over periods of a few hours to several months. Most are used to monitor temperature conditions, and some versions can also measure the relative humidity.

Data loggers are often small enough to be placed inside an insulated shipping container or directly attached to a product inside a refrigerator truck or a refrigerated container. These monitor the temperature of the product being shipped. Some data loggers are placed on the outside of the package or in the truck or intermodal container to monitor the air temperature. Placement of data loggers and sensors is critical: Studies have shown that temperatures inside a truck or intermodal container are strongly affected by proximity to exterior walls and roof and to locations on the lading.

Modern digital data loggers are very portable and record the actual times and temperatures. This information can be used to model product degradation and to pinpoint the location and cause of excessive exposure.

The measured data reveals whether the goods in transit have been subjected to potentially damaging temperature extremes or an excessive Mean kinetic temperature. Based on this data, the options may be:

- If there have not been out of tolerance temperatures for critical times, continue to use the shipment, without special inspection
- If potentially damaging temperature hazards have occurred, thoroughly inspect the shipment for damage or degradation. Possibly accelerate sale and use because of reduced shelf life.
- The consignee may negotiate with the carrier or shipper or even choose to reject a shipment where sensors indicate severe temperature history
- The time of the temperature extreme, or GPS tracking, may be able to determine the location of the infraction to direct appropriate corrective action.

Multiple replicate shipments of data loggers are also used to compare modes of shipment (routes, vendors) and to develop composite data to be used in package testing protocols.

There are many brands and models of data loggers. Most are a connectable device that must be plugged into a computer to extract the data that the logger has logged.

== See also ==
- Data logger
- Shock and vibration data logger
- Time temperature indicator
- Humidity indicator card
