= Metallized film =

Polymer film coated with a layer of metal

Metallized film is polymer plastic film coated with a thin layer of metal, usually aluminium. It offers the glossy metallic appearance of an aluminium foil at a reduced weight and cost. Metallized films are widely used for decorative purposes and food packaging, and also for specialty applications including insulation and electronics.

== Manufacture ==
Metallization is performed using a physical vapor deposition process. Aluminium is the most common metal used for deposition, but other metals such as nickel and chromium are also used. The metal is heated and evaporated under vacuum. This condenses on the cold polymer film, which is unwound near the metal vapour source. This coating is much thinner than a metal foil could be made, in the range of 0.5 micrometres. This coating will not fade or discolour over time. While oriented polypropylene (PP) and polyethylene terephthalate (PET) are the most common films used for metallization, nylon, polyethylene and cast polypropylene are also used.

== Properties ==
Metallized films have a reflective silvery surface similar to aluminium foil, but are highly flammable. The coating also reduces the permeability of the film to light, water and oxygen. The properties of the film remain, such as higher toughness, the ability to be heat sealed, and a lower density at a lower cost than an aluminium foil. This gives metallized films some advantages over aluminium foil and aluminium foil laminates. It was once thought that metallized films would become a replacement for aluminium foil laminates, but current films still cannot match the barrier properties of foil. Some very high barrier metallized films are available using ethylene vinyl alcohol (EVOH), but are not yet cost effective against foil laminates.

Comparison of Metallized PET and aluminium foil
	Moisture (g/m^{2}·day)	Oxygen (mL/m^{2}·day)	UV light (%transmittance)
PET film, 12.7 μm	31	465	91
Metallized PET	0.8	1.2	5
Aluminium foil 6 μm	0	0	0

== Uses ==
=== Decoration ===
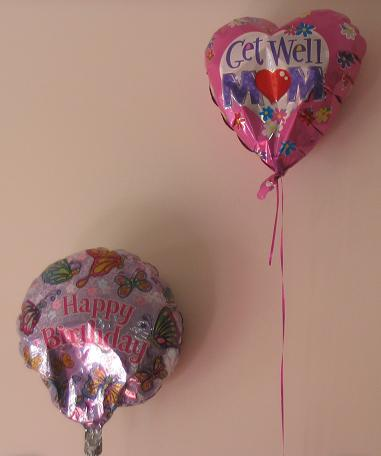
Metallized films used for balloons

Metallized films were first used for decorative purposes as Christmas tinsel, and continue to be used for items such as wrappers, ribbons, and glitter. Metallic helium-filled novelty balloons given as gifts are made of metallised biaxially oriented polyethylene terephthalate (BoPET) and often called Mylar balloons commercially.

=== Packaging ===
Both metallized PET and PP have replaced foil laminates for products such as snack foods, coffee and candy, which do not require the superior barrier of aluminium foil. Metallized nylon and polyethylene are used in the meat export market. The controlled permeation extends shelf life.

Metallized films are used as a susceptor for cooking in microwave ovens. An example is a microwave popcorn bag.

Many food items are also packaged using metallized films for appearance only, as these produce a package with greater sparkle when compared to competing products that use printed paper or polymer films.

=== Insulation ===
Metallized PET films are used in NASA spacesuits to reflect heat radiation, keeping astronauts warm, and in ″proximity suits″ used by firefighters for protection from the high amount of heat released from fuel fires. Aluminized emergency blankets ("space blankets") are also used to conserve a shock victim's body heat. MPET has been used as an antistatic container for other heat and sound insulating materials used in aircraft, to prevent the insulation from leaking into the passenger cabin, but is not itself the insulator in that use. Burning MPET insulation was identified as a cause of the crash of Swissair Flight 111 in 1998 that killed 229 people, leading to new recommendations on its use in airliners.

=== Electronics ===
Metallized films are used as a dielectric in the manufacture of a type of capacitor used in electronic circuits, and as a material in some types of antistatic bags.

== See also ==
- Carbon dioxide transmission rate
- Cutting stock problem
- Insulated shipping container
- Moisture vapour transmission rate
- Permeation
- Popcorn bag
- Oxygen transmission rate
- Biaxially-oriented PET film
- Sputter deposition
- Vacuum deposition
