= Hermetic seal =

Airtight seal

A hermetic seal is any type of sealing that makes a given object airtight (preventing the passage of air, oxygen, or other gases). The term originally applied to airtight glass containers, but as technology advanced, it applied to a larger category of materials, including metals, and rubber. Hermetic seals are essential to the correct and safe functionality of many electronic and healthcare products.

Used technically, the term is stated in conjunction with a specific test method and conditions of use. Colloquially, the exact requirements of such a seal varies with the application.

== Etymology ==
The word hermetic is indirectly related to the Greek god Hermes. The hermetic seal comes from alchemy in the tradition of Hermeticism, which was named after Hermes Trismegistus, a legendary figure who, according to the Hermeticists, invented the process of making a glass tube airtight using a secret seal.

== Uses ==
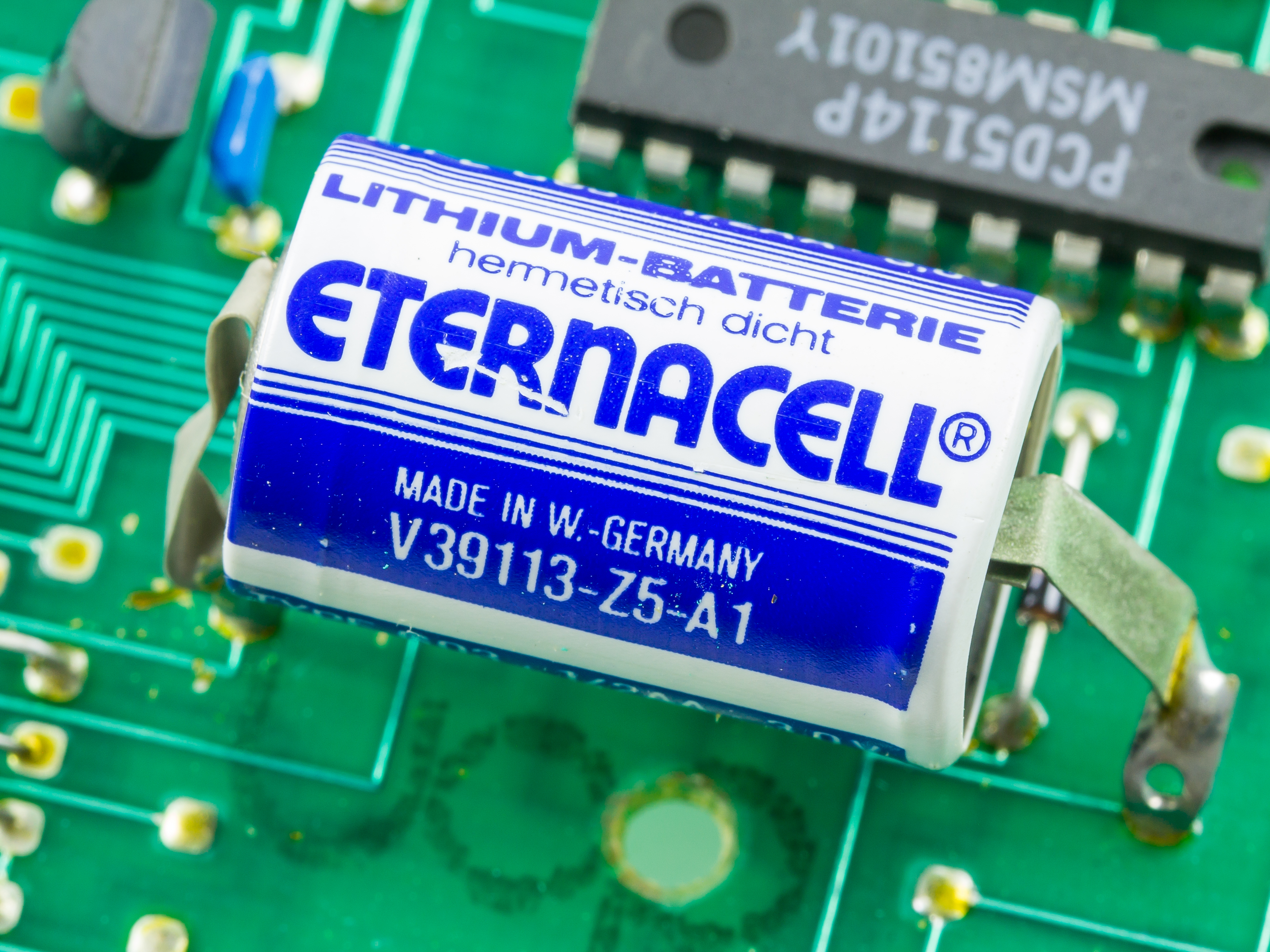
A hermetically sealed battery

Some kinds of packaging must maintain a seal against the flow of gases, for example, packaging for some foods, pharmaceuticals, chemicals, and consumer goods. The term can describe the result of some food preservation practices, such as vacuum packing and canning. Packaging materials include glass, aluminum cans, metal foils, and gas-impermeable plastics.

Some buildings designed with sustainable architecture principles may use airtight technologies to conserve energy. Green buildings may include windows that combine triple-pane insulated glazing with argon or krypton gas to reduce thermal conductivity and increase efficiency. In landscape and exterior construction projects, airtight seals may be used to protect general services and landscape lighting electrical connections/splices. Airtight implies both waterproof and vapor-proof.

Hermetic seals enable human spaceflight by sealing breathable air in the habitable areas; without hermetic sealing, the air would expand and scatter to fill the near-vacuum of space, resulting in depressurization, which can cause injury or death in living organisms.

Airlocks, which rely on hermetic sealing technology, are used to allow things and organisms to enter and exit two areas with different pressures or compositions. Airlocks are used in underwater diving, underground construction, mining, and spaceflight.

Electronic devices that use hermetic sealing include semiconductor electronics, thermostats, optical devices, MEMS, and switches. Electrical or electronic parts may be hermetic sealed to secure against water vapor and foreign bodies to maintain proper functioning and reliability.

Hermetic sealing for airtight conditions is used in archiving significant historical items. In 1951, The U.S. Constitution, U.S. Declaration of Independence, and U.S. Bill of Rights were hermetically sealed with helium gas in glass cases housed in the U.S. National Archives in Washington, D.C. In 2003, they were moved to new glass cases hermetically sealed with argon.

In the funeral industry, some caskets and burial vaults are hermetically sealed by a rubber seal and being locked.

== Types of epoxy hermetic seals ==
Typical epoxy resins have pendant hydroxyl (-OH) groups along their chain that can form bonds or strong polar attractions to oxide or hydroxyl surfaces. Most inorganic surfaces—i.e., metals, minerals, glasses, ceramics—have polarity so they have high surface energy. The important factor in determining good adhesive strength is whether the surface energy of the substrate is close to or higher than the surface energy of the cured adhesive.

Certain epoxy resins and their processes can create a hermetic bond to copper, brass, stainless steel, specialty alloys, plastic, or epoxy itself with similar coefficients of thermal expansion, and are used in the manufacture of hermetic electrical and fiber optic hermetic seals. Epoxy-based seals can increase signal density within a feedthrough design compared to other technologies with minimal spacing requirements between electrical conductors. Epoxy hermetic seal designs can be used in hermetic seal applications for low or high vacuum or pressures, effectively sealing gases or fluids including helium gas to very low helium gas leak rates similar to glass or ceramic. Hermetic epoxy seals also offer the design flexibility of sealing either copper alloy wires or pins instead of the much less electrically conductive Kovar pin materials required in glass or ceramic hermetic seals. With a typical operating temperature range of −70 °C to +125 °C or 150 °C, epoxy hermetic seals are more limited in comparison to glass or ceramic seals, although some hermetic epoxy designs are capable of withstanding 200 °C.

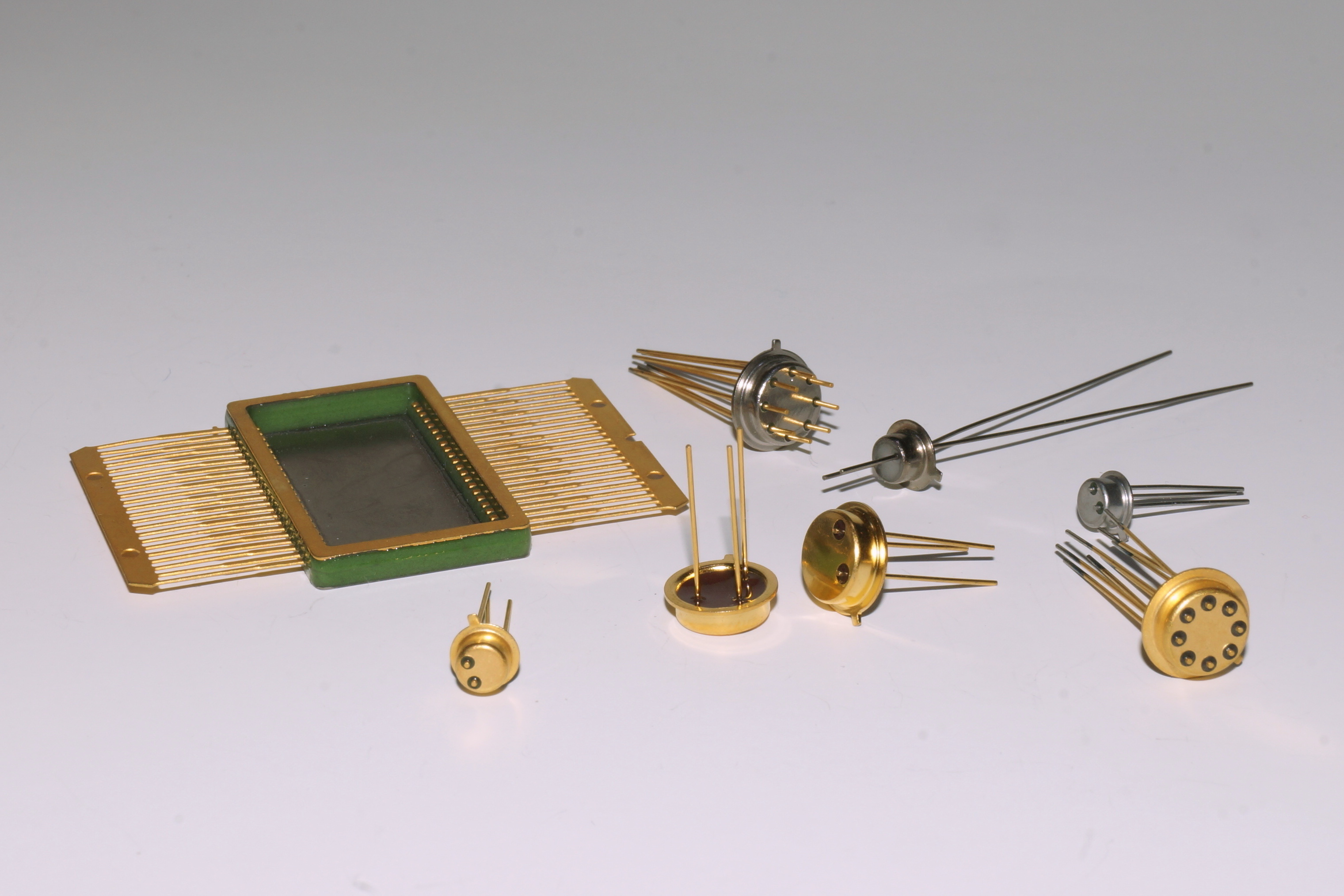
Matched glass-to-metal seals

== Types of glass-to-metal hermetic seals ==
When the glass and the metal being hermetically sealed have the same coefficient of thermal expansion, a "matched seal" derives its strength from bond between the glass and the metal's oxide. This type of glass-to-metal hermetic seal is generally used for low-intensity applications such as in light bulb bases.

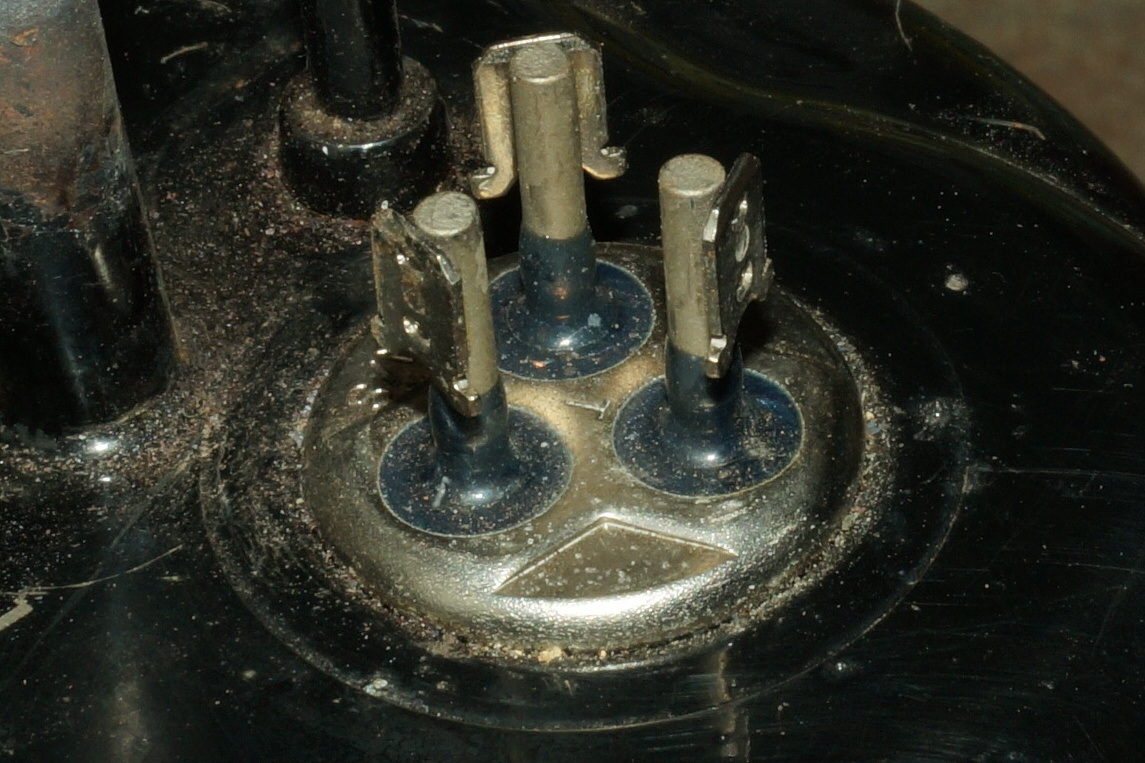
Hermetic compressor feedthrough – glass-to-metal compression seal

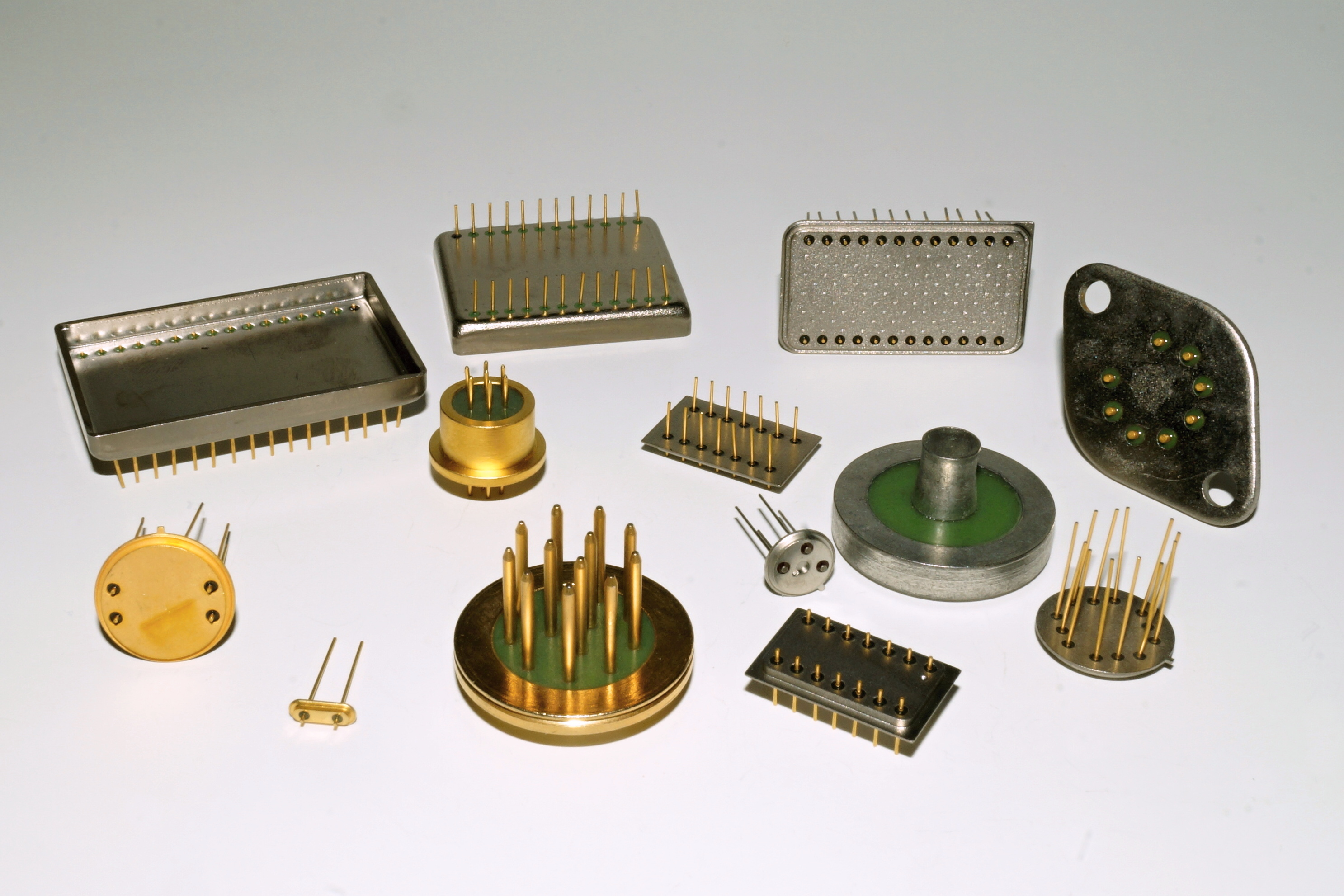
Glass-to-metal compression seals

"Compression seals" occur when the glass and the metal have different coefficients of thermal expansion such that the metal compresses around the solidified glass as it cools. Compression seals can withstand very high pressure and are used in a variety of industrial applications.

Compared to epoxy hermetic seals, glass-to-metal seals can be operated up to much higher temperatures (250 °C for compression seals, 450 °C for matched seals). The material selection is however more limited due to thermal expansion constraints. The sealing process is performed at roughly 1000 °C in an inert or reducing atmosphere to prevent discoloration of the parts.

== Ceramic-to-metal hermetic seals ==
Co-fired ceramic seals are an alternative to glass. Ceramic seals exceed the design barriers of glass to metal seals due to superior hermetic performance in high stress environments requiring a robust seal. Choosing between glass versus ceramic depends on the application, weight, thermal solution, and material requirements.

== Glassware sealing ==
=== Sealing solids ===
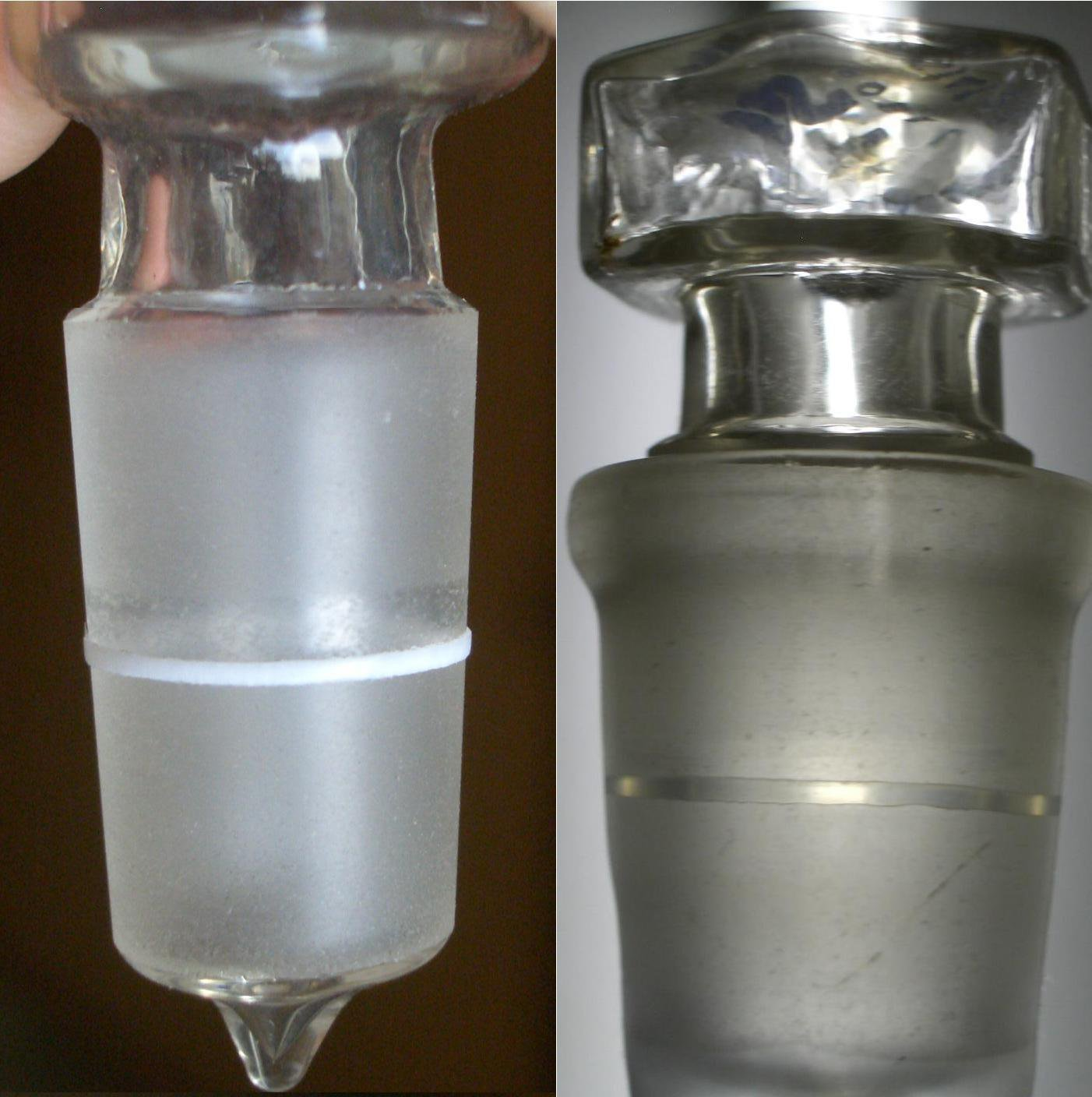
A taper-joint stopper with PTFE Sealing Ring. Optical transparency of the narrow sealing ring pressured by glass joint (right).

Glass taper joints can be sealed hermetically with PTFE sealing rings (high vacuum tight, air leakage rate 10^{−6} mBar × L/sec and below), o-rings (optionally encapsulated o-rings), or PTFE sleeves, sometimes used instead of grease that can dissolve into contamination. PTFE tape, PTFE resin string, and wax are other alternatives that are finding widespread use, but require a little care when winding onto the joint to ensure a good seal is produced.

=== Grease ===
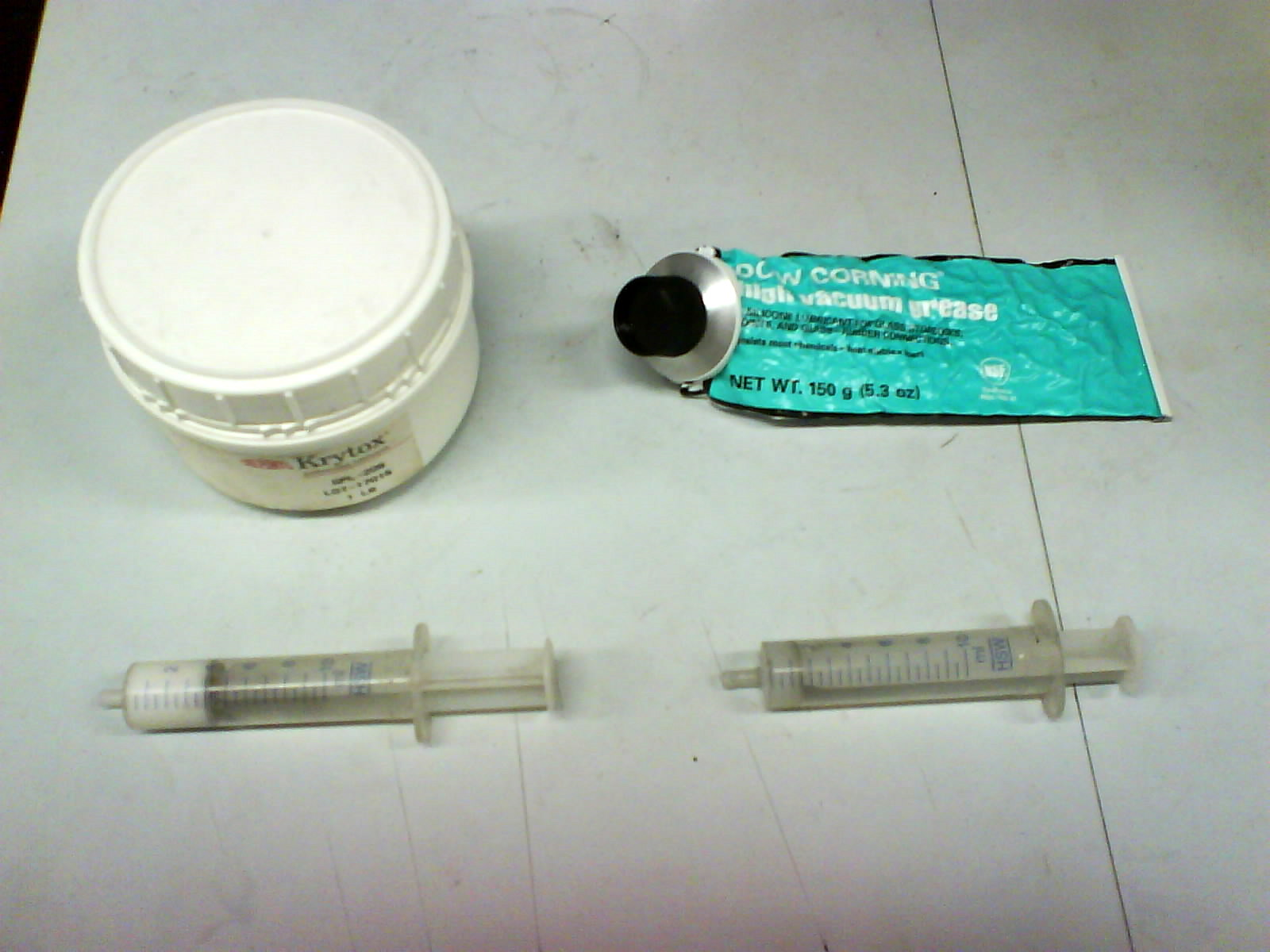
Grease is used to lubricate glass stopcocks and joints. Some laboratories fill them into syringes for easy application. Two typical examples: Left – Krytox, a fluoroether-based grease; Right – a silicone-based high vacuum grease by Dow Corning.

A thin layer of grease made for this application can be applied to the ground glass surfaces to be connected, and the inner joint is inserted into the outer joint such that the ground glass surfaces of each are next to each other to make the connection. In addition to making a leak-tight connection, the grease lets two joints be later separated more easily. A potential drawback of such grease is that if used on laboratory glassware for a long time in high-temperature applications (such as for continuous distillation), the grease may eventually contaminate the chemicals. Also, reagents may react with the grease, especially under vacuum. For these reasons, it is advisable to apply a light ring of grease at the fat end of the taper and not its tip, to keep it from going inside the glassware. If the grease smears over the entire taper surface on mating, too much was used. Using greases specifically designed for this purpose is also a good idea, as these are often better at sealing under vacuum, thicker, and so less likely to flow out of the taper, become fluidic at higher temperatures than Vaseline (a common substitute), and are more chemically inert than other substitutes.

==== Cleaning ====
Ground glass joints are translucent when clean and free of debris. Solvents, reaction mixtures, and old grease appear as transparent spots. Grease can be removed by wiping with an appropriate solvent; ethers, methylene chloride, ethyl acetate, or hexanes work well for silicone- and hydrocarbon-based greases. Fluoroether-based greases are quite impervious to organic solvents. Most chemists simply wipe them off as much as possible. Some fluorinated solvents can remove fluoroether greases, but are costlier than laboratory solvents.

== Testing ==
Standard test methods are available for measuring the moisture vapor transmission rate, oxygen transmission rate, etc. of packaging materials. Completed packages, however, involve heat seals, joints, and closures that often reduce the effective barrier of the package. For example, the glass of a glass bottle may have an effective total barrier but the screw cap closure and the closure liner might not.

== See also ==
- Building insulation
- Glass-to-metal seal
- Heat sealer
- Moisture vapor transmission rate
- Permeation
