= Vapor barrier =

Damp proofing material in sheet form

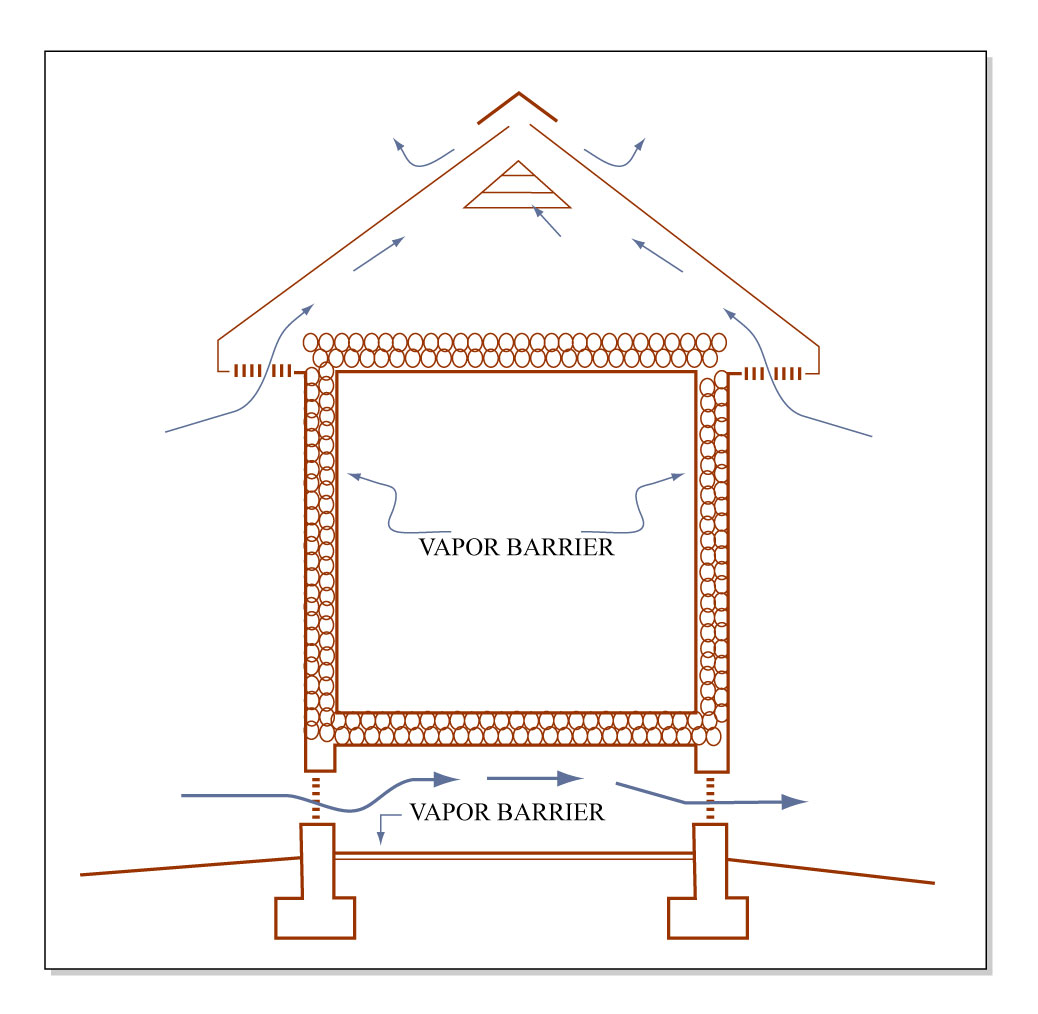
Sketch of vapor barrier over an entire house to protect against humidity.

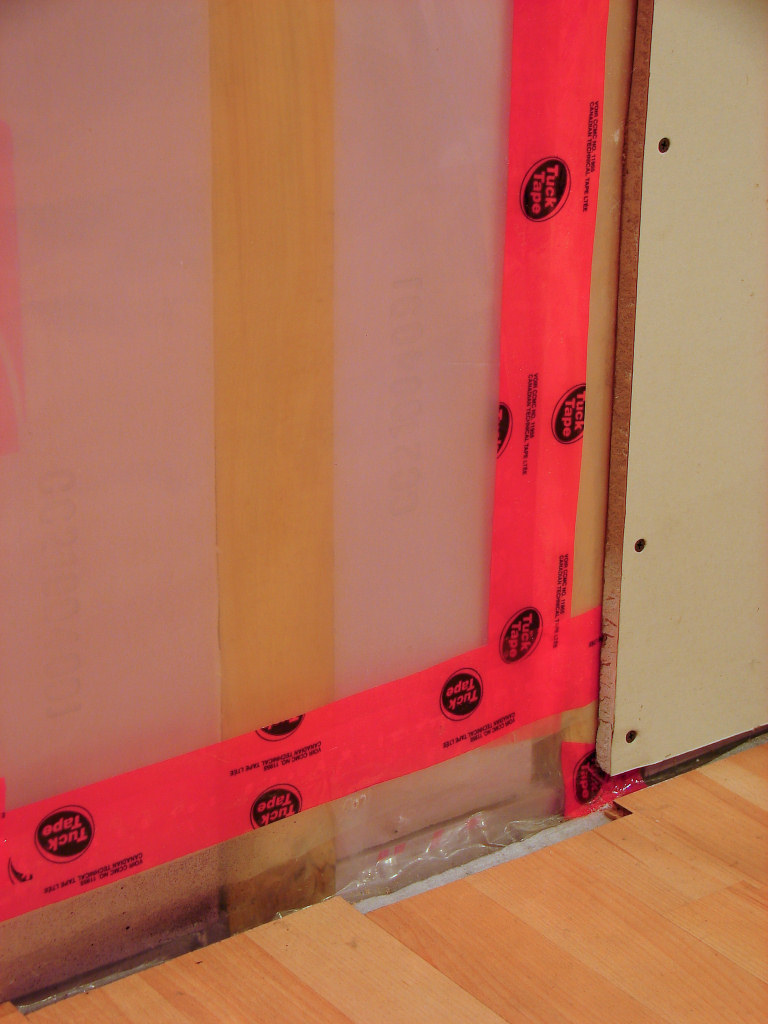
6-mil (0.15 mm) polyethylene plastic sheet as vapour barrier between insulation and gypsum board

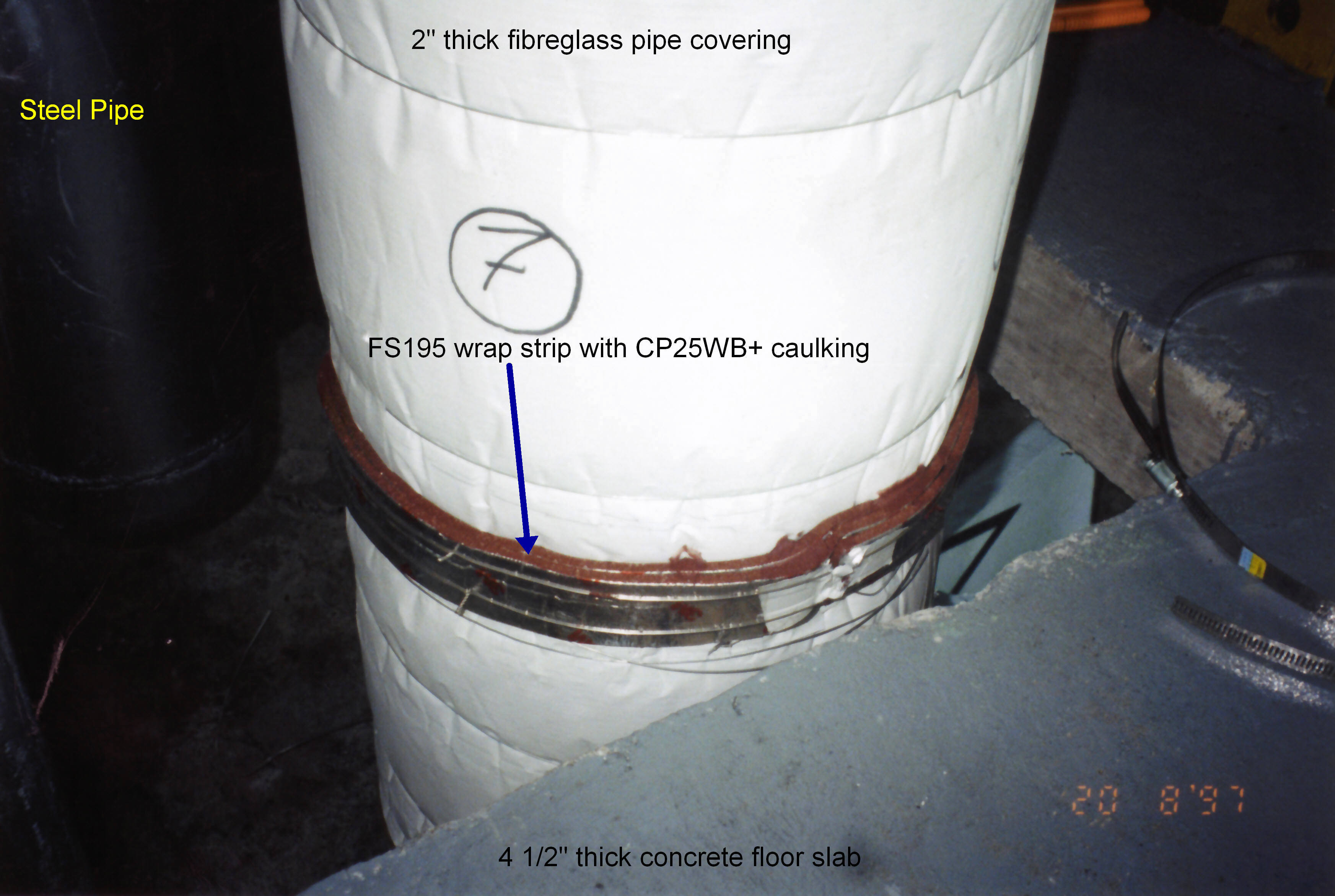
Glass wool pipe insulation covering a steel pipe as it penetrates a mock-up concrete slab whose opening will be firestopped. In this manner, the vapor barrier (in this case made of foil/scrim/kraft paper, called ASJ, all-service jacket, aluminium on the inside, white paper on the outside) can remain intact as it penetrates the fire barrier.

A vapor barrier (or vapour barrier) is any material used for damp proofing, typically a plastic or foil sheet, that resists diffusion of moisture through the wall, floor, ceiling, or roof assemblies of buildings and of packaging to prevent interstitial condensation. Technically, many of these materials are only vapor retarders as they have varying degrees of permeability.

Materials have a moisture vapor transmission rate (MVTR) that is established by standard test methods. One common set of units is g/m^{2}·day or g/100in^{2}·day. Permeability can be reported in perms, a measure of the rate of transfer of water vapor through a material (1.0 US perm = 1.0 grain/square-foot·hour·inch of mercury ≈ 57 SI perm = 57 ng/s·m^{2}·Pa). American building codes started classifying vapor retarders in the 2007 IRC supplement. They are Class I <0.1 perm, Class II 0.1 - 1 perm and Class III 1-10 perm when tested in accordance with the ASTM E96 desiccant, dry cup or method A. Vapor-retarding materials are generally categorized as:

- Class I, Impermeable (<0.1 US perm, or ≤5.7 SI perm) – such as asphalt-backed kraft paper, glass, sheet metal, polyethylene sheet, rubber membrane, vinyl wall coverings;
- Class II, Semi-impermeable (0.1-1 US perm, or 5.7-57 SI perm) – such as unfaced expanded or extruded polystyrene, OSB, fiber-faced isocyanurate, 30 pound asphalt-impregnated building papers, exterior oil-based paints, unfaced expanded polystyrene, 30 pound asphalt coated paper, plywood, bitumen coated kraft paper;
- Class III, Semi-permeable (1-10 US perm, or 57-570 SI perm) – such as unfaced expanded polystyrene, fiber-faced isocyanurate, plywood, 15 pound asphalt coated paper, some latex-based paints;
- Permeable (>10 US perm, or >570 SI perm) – such as unpainted gypsum board and plaster, unfaced fiber glass insulation, cellulose insulation, unpainted stucco, cement sheathings, spunbonded polyolefin (building wraps) or some polymer-based exterior air barrier films.

== Materials ==
Vapor diffusion retarders are normally available as coatings or membranes. The membranes are technically flexible and thin materials, but sometime includes thicker sheet materials named as "structural" vapor diffusion retarders. The vapor diffusion retarders varies from all kinds of materials and keep updating every day, some of them nowadays even combined the functions of other building materials.

Materials used as vapor retarders:

- Elastomeric coatings can provide a vapor barrier and water proofing with permeability ratings of .016 perm rating with 10 mils/min. of coating and can be applied on interior or exterior surfaces.
- Aluminum foil, 0.05 US perm (2.9 SI perm).
- Paper-backed aluminum.
- Asphalt or coal tar pitch, typically hot-applied to concrete roof decks along with reinforcement felts.
- Polyethylene plastic sheet, 4 or 6 thou (0.10 or 0.15 mm), 0.03 US perm (1.7 SI perm).
- Advanced Polyethylene vapor retarders that pass the ASTM E 1745 standard tests ≤0.3 US perm (17 SI perm).
- Asphalt-coated kraft paper, often attached to one side of fiberglass batts, 0.40 US perm (22 SI perm).
- Metallized film
- Vapor retarder paints (for the air-tight drywall system, for retrofits where finished walls and ceilings will not be replaced, or for dry basements: can break down over time due to being chemically based).
- Extruded polystyrene or foil-faced foam board insulation.
- Exterior grade plywood, 0.70 US perm (40 SI perm).
- Most sheet type monolithic roofing membranes.
- Glass and metal sheets (such as in doors and windows).

== Building construction ==
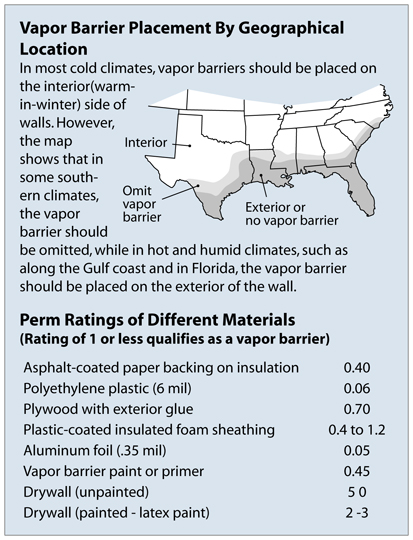
Vapor barrier location by geographical location

Moisture or water vapor moves into building cavities in three ways: 1) With air currents, 2) By diffusion through materials, 3) By heat transfer. Of these three, air movement accounts for more than 98% of all water vapor movement in building cavities. A vapor retarder and an air barrier serve to reduce this problem, but are not necessarily interchangeable.

Vapor retarders slow the rate of vapor diffusion into the thermal envelope of a structure. Other wetting mechanisms, such as wind-borne rain, capillary wicking of ground moisture, air transport (infiltration), are equally important.

=== Usage ===
The industry has recognized that in many circumstances it may be impractical to design and build building assemblies which never get wet. Good design and practice involve controlling the wetting of building assemblies from both the exterior and interior. So, the use of vapor barrier should be taken into consideration. Their use has already been legislated within the building code of some countries (such as the U.S., Canada, Ireland, England, Scotland & Wales). How, where, and whether a vapor barrier (vapor diffusion retarder) should be used depends on the climate. Typically, the number of heating degree days (HDD) in an area is used to help make these determinations. A heating degree day is a unit that measures how often outdoor daily dry-bulb temperatures fall below an assumed base, normally 18 °C (65 °F). For building in most parts of North America, where winter heating conditions predominate, vapor barrier are placed toward the interior, heated side of insulation in the assembly. In humid regions where warm-weather cooling predominates within buildings, the vapor barrier should be located toward the exterior side of insulation. In relatively mild or balanced climates, or where assemblies are designed to minimize condensation conditions, a vapor barrier may not be necessary at all.

An interior vapor retarder is useful in heating-dominated climates while an exterior vapor retarder is useful in cooling-dominated climates. In most climates it is often better to have a vapor-open building assembly, meaning that walls and roofs should be designed to dry: either to the inside, the outside, or both, so the ventilation of water vapor should be taken into consideration. A vapor barrier on the warm side of the envelope must be combined with a venting path on the cold side of the insulation. This is because no vapor barrier is perfect, and because water may get into the structure, typically from rain. In general, the better the vapor barrier and the drier the conditions, the less venting is required.

In areas below foundation level (subgrade areas), particularly those formed in concrete, vapor retarder placement can be problematic, as moisture infiltration from capillary action can exceed water vapor movement outward through framed and insulated walls.

A slab-on-grade or basement floor should be poured over a cross-laminated polyethylene vapor barrier over 4 inches (10 cm) of granular fill to prevent wicking of moisture from the ground and radon gas incursion.

Inside a steel building, water vapor will condense whenever it comes into contact with a surface that is below the dew point temperature. Visible condensation on windowpanes and purlins that results in dripping can be somewhat mitigated with ventilation; however insulation is the preferred method of condensation prevention.

== Confusion with air barrier ==
The function of a vapor barrier is to retard the migration of water vapor. A vapor barrier is not typically intended to retard the migration of air. This is the function of air barriers. Air is mixed with water vapor. When air moves from location to location due to an air pressure difference, the vapor moves with it. This is a type of migration of water vapor. In the strictest sense air barriers are also vapor barriers when they control the transport of moisture-laden air. It must be mentioned that the designated perm ratings do not reflect the diminished permeability of a given vapor retarder medium when affected by temperature differences on opposing sides of the medium. A discussion about the differences between vapor barriers and air barriers can be found in Quirouette.

== Packaging ==
The ability of a package to control the permeation and penetration of gasses is vital for many types of products. Tests are often conducted on the packaging materials but also on the completed packages, sometimes after being subjected to flexing, handling, vibration, or temperature.

== See also ==
- Air barrier
- Heating, ventilation, and air conditioning (HVAC)
- Infiltration
