= Package testing =

Formal testing of packaging

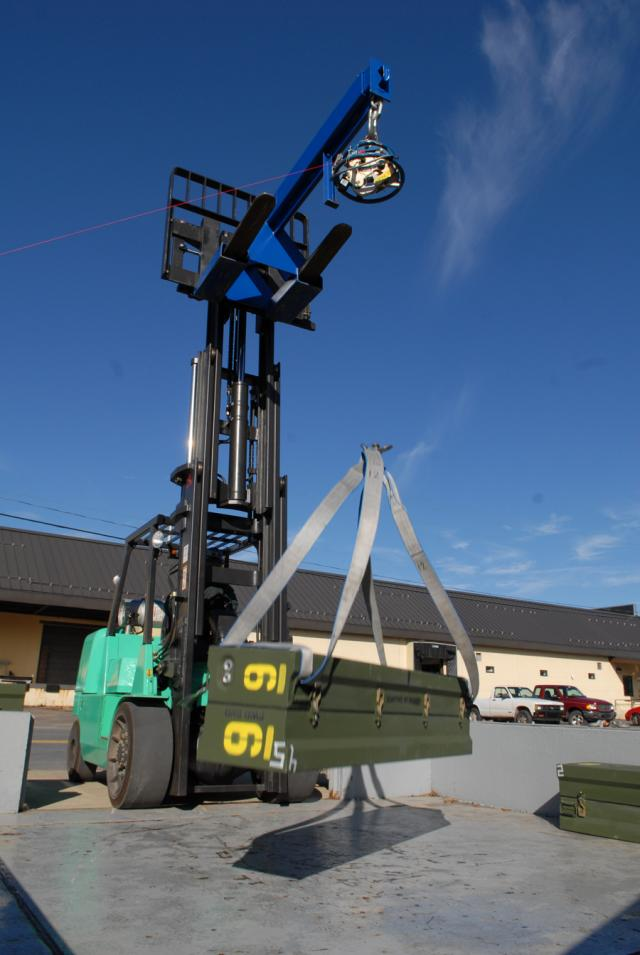
Military shipping container being drop tested

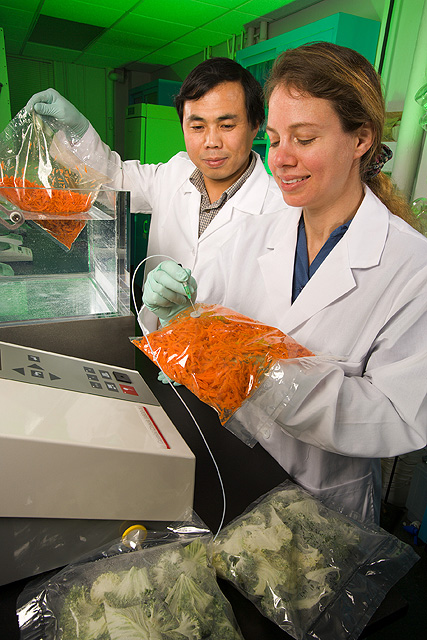
Testing modified atmosphere in a plastic bag of carrots

Package testing or packaging testing involves the measurement of a characteristic or property involved with packaging. This includes packaging materials, packaging components, primary packages, shipping containers, and unit loads, as well as the associated processes.

Testing measures the effects and interactions of the levels of packaging, the package contents, external forces, and end-use.

It can involve controlled laboratory experiments, subjective evaluations by people, or field testing. Documentation is important: formal test method, test report, photographs, video, etc.

Testing can be a qualitative or quantitative procedure. Package testing is often a physical test. With some types of packaging such as food and pharmaceuticals, chemical tests are conducted to determine suitability of food contact materials. Testing programs range from simple tests with little replication to more thorough experimental designs.

Package testing can extend for the full life cycle. Packages can be tested for their ability to be recycled and their ability to degrade as surface litter, in a sealed landfill or under composting conditions.

== Purposes ==
Packaging testing might have a variety of purposes, such as:

- Determine if, or verify that, the requirements of a specification, regulation, or contract are met
- Decide if a new product development program is on track: Demonstrate proof of concept
- Provide standard data for other scientific, engineering, and quality assurance functions
- Validate suitability for end-use
- Provide a basis for technical communication
- Provide a technical means of comparison of several options
- Provide evidence in legal proceedings: product liability, patents, product claims, etc.
- Help solve problems with current packaging
- Help identify potential cost savings in packaging

Packaging tests can be used for:

- Subjecting packages (and contents) to stresses and dynamics found in the field
- Reproducing the types of damage to packages and contents found in actual shipments
- Control uniform production of packages and components

== Importance ==
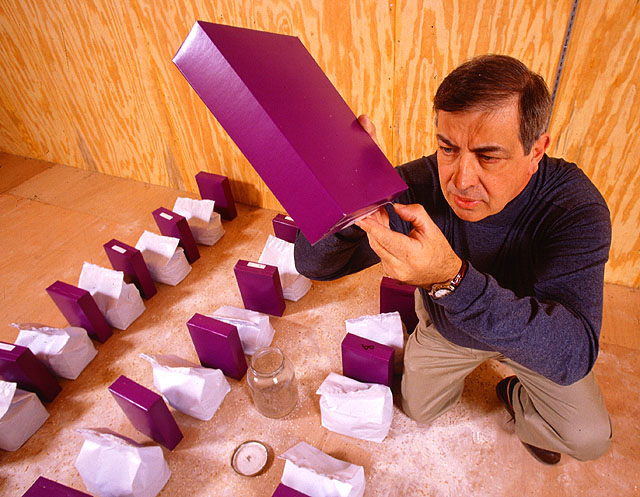
Testing the ability of packages to resist insect infestation

For some types of products, package testing is mandated by regulations: food. pharmaceuticals, medical devices, dangerous goods, etc. This may cover both the design qualification, periodic retesting, and control of the packaging processes. Processes may be controlled by a variety of quality management systems such as HACCP, statistical process control, validation protocols, ISO 9000, etc.

For unregulated products, testing can be required by a contract or governing specification. The degree of package testing can often be a business decision. Risk management may involve factors such as

- costs of packaging
- costs of package testing
- value of contents being shipped
- value of customer's good will
- product liability exposure
- other potential costs of inadequate packaging
- etc.

With distribution packaging, one vital packaging development consideration is to determine if a packaged-product is likely to be damaged in the process of getting to the final customer. A primary purpose of a package is to ensure the safety of a product during transportation and storage. If a product is damaged during this process, then the package has failed to accomplish a primary objective and the customer will either return the product or be unlikely to purchase the product altogether.

Package testing is often a formal part of Project management programs. Packages are usually tested when there is a new packaging design, a revision to a current design, a change in packaging material, and various other reasons. Testing a new packaging design before full scale manufacturing can save time and money.

== Laboratory affiliation ==
Many suppliers or vendors offer limited material and package testing as a free service to customers. It is common for packagers to partner with reputable suppliers: Many suppliers have certified quality management systems such as ISO 9000 or allow customers to conduct technical and quality audits. Data from testing is commonly shared. There is sometimes a risk that supplier testing may tend to be self-serving and not completely impartial.

Large companies often have their own packaging staff and a package testing and development laboratory. Corporate engineers know their products, manufacturing capabilities, logistics system, and their customers best. Cost reduction of existing products and cost avoidance for new products have been documented.

Another option is to use a paid consultant, Independent contractor, and third-party independent testing laboratory. They are commonly chosen for specialized expertise, for access to certain test equipment, for surge projects, or where independent testing is otherwise required. Many have certifications and accreditations: ISO 9000, ISO/IEC 17025, and various governing agencies.

== Procedures ==
Several standards organizations publish test methods for package testing. Included are:

- International Organization for Standardization, ISO
- ASTM International
- European Committee for Standardization. CEN
- TAPPI
- Military Standards
- ISTA (International Safe Transit Association)

Governments and regulators publish some packaging test methods. There are also many corporate test standards in use. A review of technical literature and patents provides good options to consider for test procedures.

Researchers are not restricted to the use of published standards but can modify existing test methods or develop procedures specific to their particular needs. If a test is conducted with a deviation from a published test method or if a new method is employed, the test report must fully disclose the procedure.

== Materials testing ==
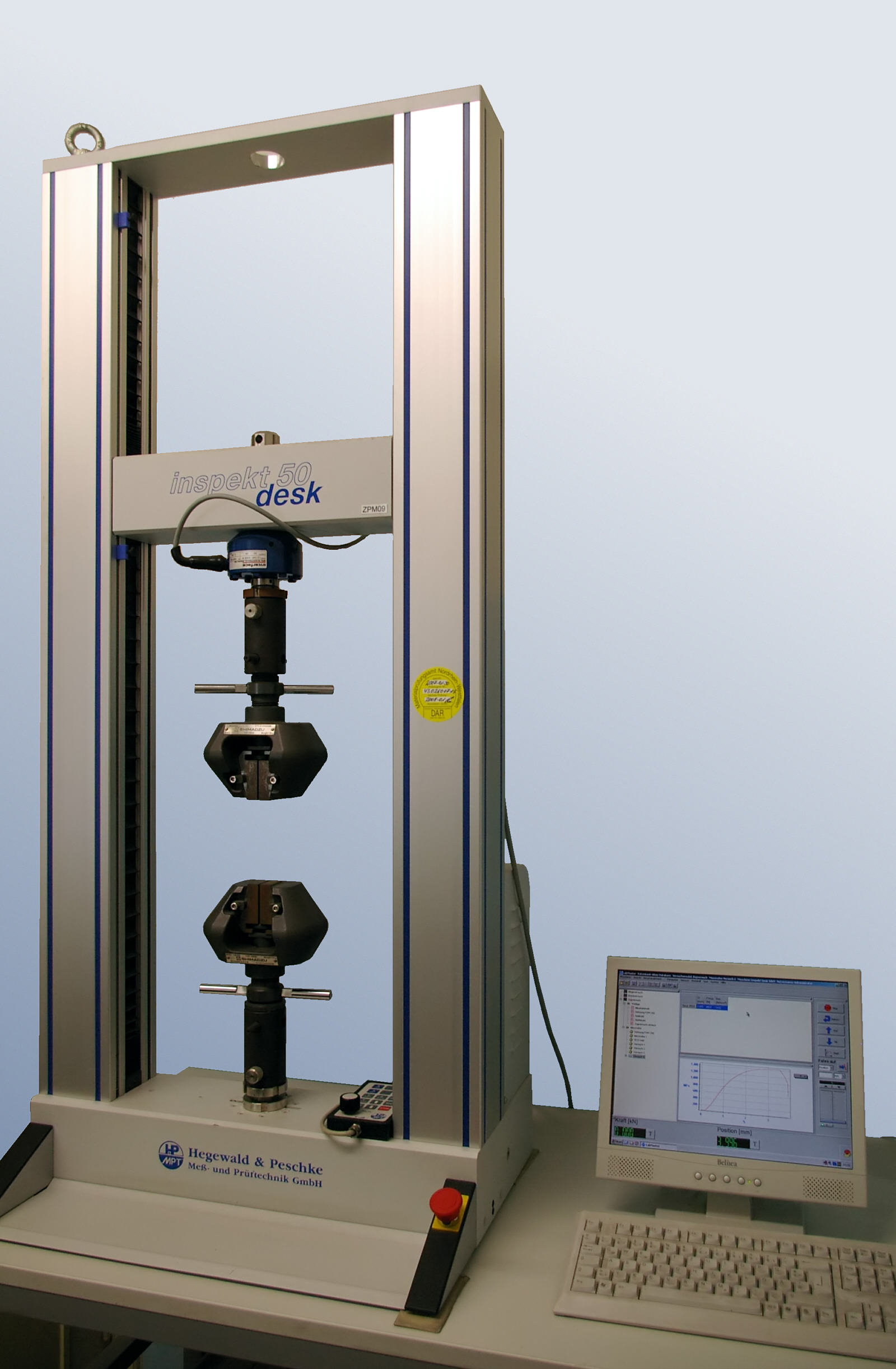
Materials and components are often evaluated on a universal testing machine.

The basis of packaging design and performance is the component materials. The physical properties, and sometimes chemical properties, of the materials need to be communicated to packaging engineers to aid in the design process. Suppliers publish data sheets and other technical communications that include the typical or average relevant physical properties and the test method these are based upon. Sometimes these are adequate. Other times, additional material and component testing is required by the packager or supplier to better define certain characteristics.

When a final package design is complete, the specifications for the component materials needs to be communicated to suppliers. Packaging materials testing is often needed to identify the critical material characteristics and engineering tolerances. These are used to prepare and enforce specifications.

For example, shrink film data might include: tensile strength (MD and CD), elongation, Elastic modulus, surface energy, thickness, Moisture vapor transmission rate, Oxygen transmission rate, heat seal strength, heat sealing conditions, heat shrinking conditions, etc. Average and process capability are often provided. The chemical properties related for use as Food contact materials may be necessary.

== Testing with people ==
Some types of package testing do not use scientific instruments but use people for the evaluation.

The regulations for child-resistant packaging require a test protocol that involves children. Samples of the test packages are given to a prescribed population of children. With specified 50-child panels, a high percentage must be unable to open a test package within 5 minutes. Adults are also tested for their ability to open a child-resistant package.

Consumer packages are often evaluated by focus groups. People evaluate the package features in a room monitored by video cameras. The consumer responses are treated qualitatively for feedback into the new packaging process.

Some food packagers use organoleptic evaluations. People use their senses (taste, smell, etc.) to determine if a package component has tainted the food in the package.

A new package may be evaluated in a test market that uses people to try the packages at home. Consumers have the opportunity to buy a product, perhaps with a coupon or discount. Return postcards or Internet sites provide feedback to package developers. Perhaps the most critical feedback is repeated sales items in the new package. Packaging evaluations are an important part of marketing research.

Legibility of text on packaging and labels is always subjective due to the inherent variations of people. Efforts have been made to help better quantify this by people in a laboratory: still using people for the evaluation but also employing a test apparatus to help reduce variability.

Some laboratory tests are conducted but still result in an observation by people. Some test procedures call for a judgment by test engineers whether or not pre-established acceptance criteria have been met.

=== Relevant standards ===
ASTM D7298 Test Method for Measurement of Comparative Legibility by Means of Polarizing Filter Instrumentation.
ASTM E460 Practice for Determining Effect of Packaging on Food and Beverage Products During Storage
ASTM E619 Practice for Evaluating Foreign Odors in Paper Packaging
ASTM E1870 Test Method for Odor and Taste Transfer from Polymeric Packaging Film
ASTM 2609 Test Method for Odor and Flavor Transfer from Rigid Polymeric Packaging
ISO 16820 Sensory Analysis – Methodology – Sequential Analysis
ISO 5495 Sensory Analysis – Methodology – Paired Comparisons
ISO 13302 Sensory Analysis – Methods for assessing modifications to the flavour of foodstuffs due to packaging

== Conditioning, testing atmosphere ==
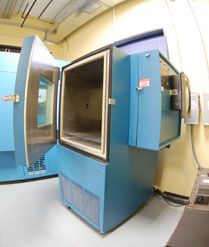
Environmental chamber to simulate temperatures and humidities encountered by packages

The environmental conditions of testing are critical. The measured performance of many packages is affected by the conditioning and testing atmospheres. For example, paper based products are strongly affected by their moisture content: Relative humidity needs to be controlled. Plastic products are often strongly affected by temperature.

Conditions of 23 °C (73.4 °F) and 50% relative humidity are common but other standard testing conditions are also published in material and package test standards. Engineering tolerances for the conditions are also specified. Often the package is conditioned to the specified environment and tested under those conditions. This can be in a conditioned room or in a chamber enclosing the test. With some testing, the package is conditioned to a specified environment, then is removed to ambient conditions and quickly tested. The test report needs to state the actual conditions used.

Engineers have found it important to know the effects of the full range of expected conditions on package performance. This can be through investigating published technical literature, obtaining supplier documentation, or by conducting controlled tests at diverse conditions.

=== Relevant standards ===
ASTM D4332 - Standard Practice for Conditioning Containers, Packages, or Packaging Components for Testing
ASTM E171 - Standard Specification for Standard Atmospheres for Conditioning and Testing Flexible Barrier Materials
ASTM F2825 - Standard Practice for Climate Stressing of Packaging Systems for Single Parcel Delivery

== Degradation of product ==
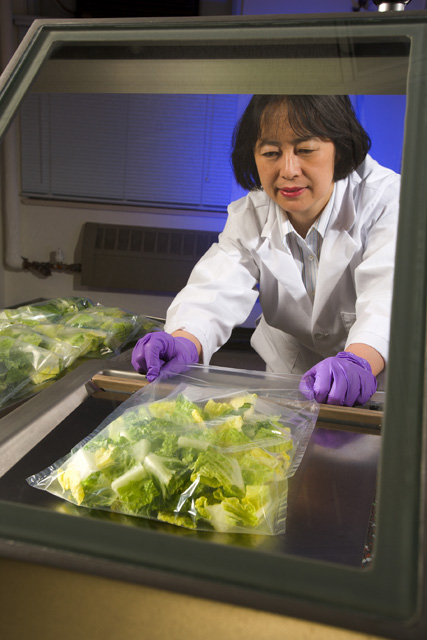
Heat sealer used to prepare bag of lettuce for shelf life testing

Laboratory tests can help determine the shelf life of a package and its contents under a variety of conditions. This is particularly important for foods, pharmaceuticals, some chemicals, and a variety of products. The testing is usually product specific: the mechanisms of degradation are often different. Exposures to expected and elevated temperatures and humidities are commonly used for shelf life testing. The ability of packaging to control product degradation is frequently a subject of laboratory and field evaluations.

=== Relevant tests ===
ASTM E2454 Standard Guide for Sensory Evaluation Methods to Determine the Sensory Shelf -life of Consumer Products
DoD 4140.27M Shelf Life Management Manual, 2000
ISO 11987 Ophthalmic Optics, Contact Lenses, Determination of Shelf Life

=== Barrier properties ===
Many products degrade with exposure to the atmosphere: foods, pharmaceuticals, chemicals, etc. The ability of a package to control the permeation and penetration of gasses is vital for many types of products. Tests are often conducted on the packaging materials but also on the completed packages, sometimes after being subjected to flexing, handling, vibration, or temperature.

== Degradation of packages ==
Packages can degrade with exposure to temperature, humidity, time, sterilization (steam, radiation, gas, etc.), sunlight, and other environmental factors. For some types of packaging, it is common to test for possible corrosion of metals, polymer degradation, and weather testing of polymers. Several types of accelerated aging of packaging and materials can be accomplished in a laboratory.

Exposure to elevated temperatures accelerates some degradation mechanisms. An Arrhenius equation is often used to correlate certain chemical reactions at different temperatures, based on the proper choice of Q_{10} coefficients.

As with any laboratory testing, validating field trials are important.

=== Relevant tests ===
ASTM D3045 - Standard Practice for Heat Aging of Plastics without Load
ASTM F1640 - Standard Guide for Packaging Materials for Foods to be Irradiated
ASTM F1980 – Standard Guide for Accelerated Aging of Sterile Barrier Systems for Medical Devices
ASTM G151 - Standard Practice for Exposing Non-metallic Materials in Accelerated Test Devices that are Laboratory Light Sources

== Vacuum testing ==
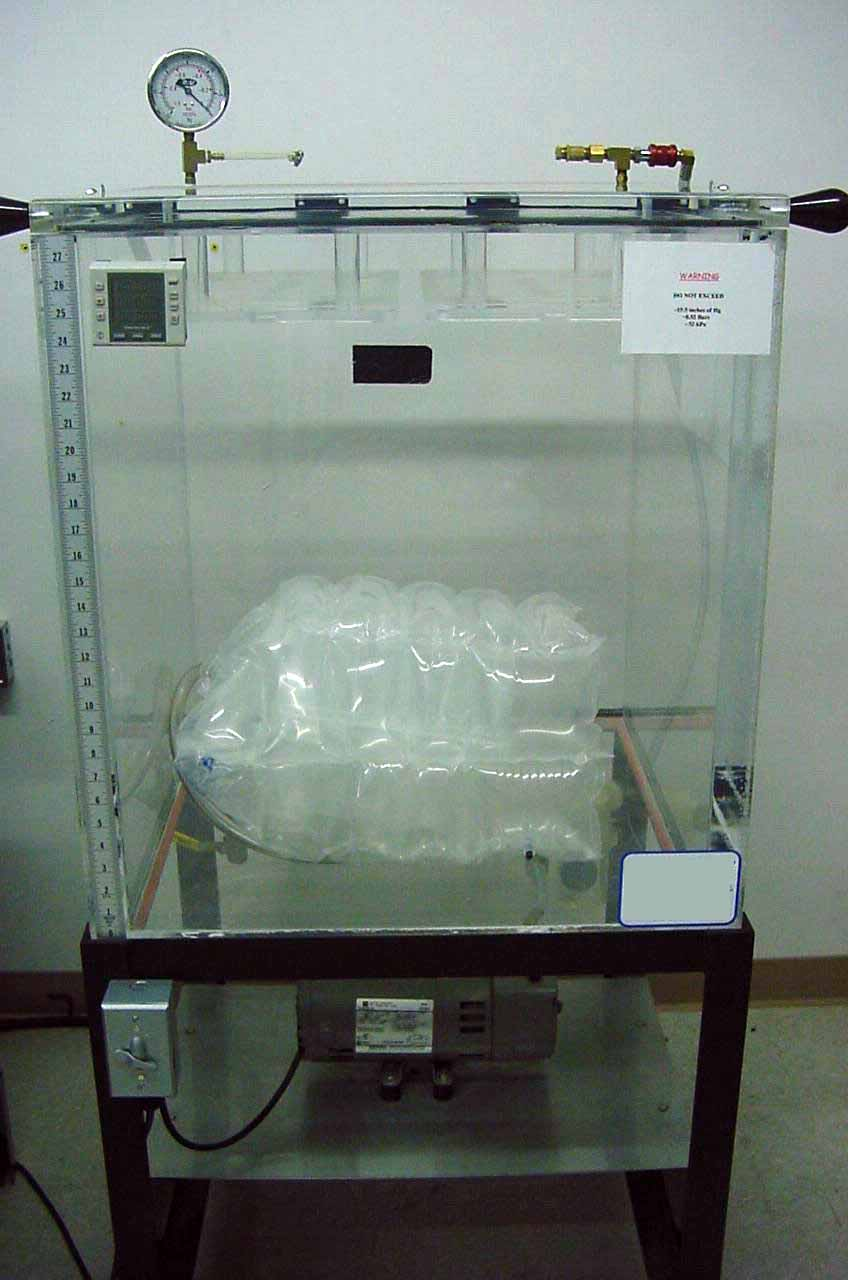
Vacuum chamber for testing leaks in packaging component

Vacuum chambers are used to test the ability of a package to withstand low pressures. This can be to:

1. Determine the ability of packages to withstand low pressures that might be encountered. this could be in an air shipment or high altitude truck shipment.
2. A laboratory vacuum places controlled stress on a sealed package to test the strength of seals, the tendency for leakage, and the ability to retain sterility.

=== Relevant tests ===
ASTM D3078- Standard Test Method for Determination of Leaks in Flexible Packaging by Bubble Emission
ASTM D4991- Standard Test Method for Leakage Testing of Empty Rigid Containers by Vacuum Method
ASTM D6653- Standard Test Methods for Determining the Effects of High Altitude on Packaging Systems by Vacuum Method
ASTM D6834- Standard Test Method for Determining Product Leakage from a Package with a Mechanical Pump Dispenser
ASTM E493- Standard Test Methods for Leaks Using the Mass Spectrometer Leak Detector in the Inside-Out Testing Mode
ASTM F2338- Standard Test Method for Nondestructive Detection of Leaks in Packages by Vacuum Decay Method
ASTM F2391- Standard Test Method for Measuring Package and Seal Integrity Using Helium as the Tracer Gas

== Shock and impact ==
Instrumented drop test of cushioned package to measure the transmitted shock

Both primary (consumer) packages and shipping containers have a risk of being dropped or being impacted by other items. Package integrity and product protection are important packaging functions. Tests are conducted to measure the resistance of packages and products to controlled laboratory shock and impact.

Testing also determines the effectiveness of package cushioning to isolate fragile products from shock. Instrumentation is used to measure the shock transmitted to a cushioned product. Simple drop tests can be used for evaluations.

=== Relevant tests ===
ASTM D880- Standard Test Method for Impact Testing for Shipping Containers and Systems
ASTM D1596- Standard Test Method for Dynamic Shock Cushioning Characteristics of Packaging Materials
ASTM D3332- Standard Test Methods for Mechanical-Shock Fragility of Products, Using Shock Machines
ASTM D4003- Standard Test Methods for Programmable Horizontal Impact Test for Shipping Containers and Systems
ASTM D5265- Standard Test Method for Bridge Impact Testing
ASTM D5276- Standard Test Method for Drop Test of Loaded Containers by Free Fall
ASTM D5277- Standard Test Method for Performing Programmed Horizontal Impacts Using an Inclined Impact Tester
ASTM D5487- Standard Test Method for Simulated Drop of Loaded Containers by Shock Machines
ASTM D6344- Standard Test Method for Concentrated Impacts to Transport Packages
ASTM D6537- Standard Practice for Instrumented Package Shock Testing For Determination of Package Performance
MIL-STD-810G

== Package insulation ==
Many packages are used for products that are sensitive to temperature. The ability of insulated shipping containers to protect their contents from exposure to temperature fluctuations can be measured in a laboratory. The testing can be of empty containers or of full containers with appropriate jell or ice packs, contents, etc. Ovens, freezers, and environmental chambers are commonly used for this and other types of packaging. Effects of shock and vibration on thermal performance may also be studied.

Digital temperature data loggers are used to measure temperatures experienced in different distribution systems. This data is sometimes used to develop unique laboratory test methods for that distribution system.

=== Relevant tests ===
ASTM D3103-Standard Test Method for Thermal Insulation Performance of Distribution Packages
ISTA 7E – Testing Standard for Thermal Transport Packaging Used in Parcel Delivery System Shipment

== Thermal shock ==
Some packages, particularly glass, can be sensitive to sudden changes in temperature: Thermal shock. One method of testing involves rapid movement from cold to hot water baths, and back.

=== Relevant tests ===
ASTM C149 -Standard Test Method for Thermal Shock Resistance of Glass Containers
MIL-STD-810G METHOD 503.5

== Handles ==
Package handles (and hand holes in packages) assist carrying and handling packages. Objective laboratory procedures are frequently used to help determine performance. Fixtured "hands" of various designs are used to hold a handle (sometimes two handles for a box). Most common are "jerk testing" by modified drop test procedures or use of the constant pull rates of a universal testing machine. Other procedures use a static force by hanging a heavily loaded package for an extended time or even using a centrifuge.

=== Relevant tests ===
ASTM D6804, Standard Guide for Hand Hole Design in Corrugated Boxes, Appendix
ASTM F852 Specification for Portable Gasoline, Kerosene, and Diesel Containers for Consumer Use, section 7.2
Centrifugal test of beverage carrier handle

== Vibration ==
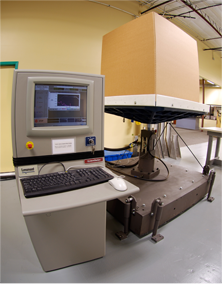
Vibration tester to simulate vibration frequencies at which packaged products are subjected during shipments

Vibration is encountered during shipping (vehicle vibration, rough roads, etc.) and movement on conveyors. Potential vibration damage may include:

- fractures and fatigue damage
- loose wires, screw caps, etc.
- bruises on soft products (fruit, etc.)
- surface abrasion
- etc.

The ability of a package to withstand these vibrations and to protect the contents can be measured by several laboratory test procedures. Some allow searching for the particular frequencies of vibration that have potential for damage. Modal testing methodologies are sometimes employed. Others use specified bands of random vibration to better represent complex vibrations measured in field studies of distribution environments.

=== Relevant tests ===
ASTM D999- Standard Test Methods for Vibration Testing of Shipping Containers
ASTM D3580-Standard Test Methods for Vibration (Vertical Linear Motion) Test of Products
ASTM D4728- Standard Test Method for Random Vibration Testing of Shipping Containers
ASTM D5112- Standard Test Method for Vibration (Horizontal Linear Sinusoidal Motion) Test of Products
ASTM D7387- Standard Test Method for Vibration Testing of Intermediate Bulk Containers (IBCs) Used for Shipping Liquid Hazardous Materials (Dangerous Goods)

== Abrasion ==
Abrasion can affect several levels of packaging. Items being shipped may rub against each other or against package surfaces during shipment. Inner packages can abrade against each other, damaging graphics and bar codes. Shipping containers such as corrugated boxes can have tape and labels damaged. Several types of package vibration tests are used to help determine effects of transport vibration. Corrective action can then be taken. Separate material tests are also useful.

=== Relevant tests ===
ASTM D4060 Standard Test Method for Abrasion Resistance of Organic Coatings by the Taber Abraser
ASTM D5181 Standard Practice for Abrasion Resistance of Printed Matter by the GA-CAT Comprehensive Abrasion Tester
ASTM D5264 Standard Practice for Abrasion Resistance of Printed Materials by the Sutherland Rub Tester
ASTM D5416 Test Method for Evaluating Abrasion Resistance of Stretch Wrap Films by Vibration Testing
ASTM D7027 Standard Test Method for Evaluation of Scratch Resistance of Polymeric Coatings and Plastics Using an Instrumented Scratch Machine

== Compression ==
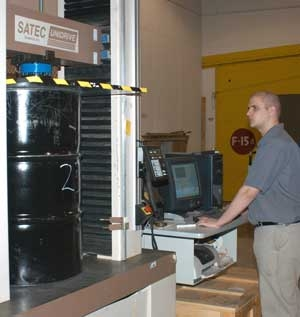
Compression test for steel drum

Compression testing relates to stacking or crushing of packages, particularly shipping containers. It usually measures of the force required to crush a package, stack of packages, or a unit load. Packages can be empty or filled as for shipment. A force-deflection curve used to obtain the peak load or other desired points. Other tests use a constant load and measure the time to failure or to a critical deflection.

Dynamic compression is sometimes tested by shock or impact testing with an additional load to crush the test package. Dynamic compression also takes place in stacked vibration testing.

=== Relevant Tests ===
ASTM Standard D642 Test Method for Determining Compressive Resistance of Shipping Containers, Components, and Unit Loads.
ASTM Standard D4577 Test Method for Compression Resistance of a Container Under Constant Load
ASTM Standard D7030 Test Method for Short Term Creep Performance of Corrugated Fiberboard Containers Under Constant Load Using a Compression Test Machine
German Standard DIN 55440-1 Packaging Test; compression test; test with a constant conveyance-speed
ISO 12048 Packaging—Complete, filled transport packages—Compression and stacking tests using a compression tester

== Large loads ==
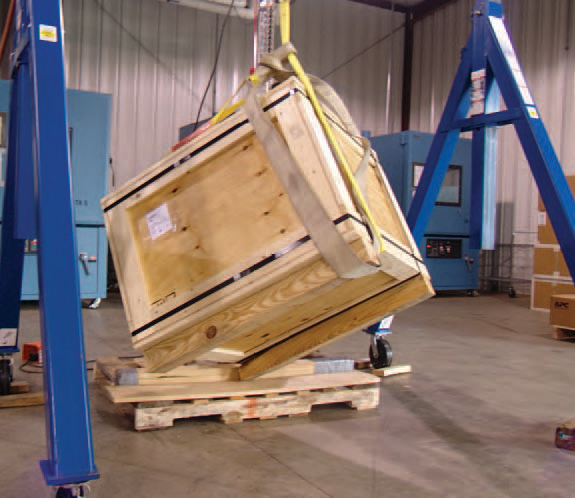
Rotational corner drop test of wooden box

Large pallet loads, bulk boxes, wooden boxes, and crates can be evaluated by many of the other test procedures previously listed. In addition, some special test methods are available for these larger loads.

=== Relevant tests ===
ASTM D5331- Standard Test Method for Evaluation of Mechanical Handling of Unitized Loads Secured with Stretch Wrap Films
ASTM D5414- Standard Test Method for Evaluation of Horizontal Impact Performance of Load Unitizing Stretch Wrap Films
ASTM D5415- Standard Test Method for Evaluating Load Containment Performance of Stretch Wrap Films by Vibration Testing
ASTM D5416- Standard Test Method for Evaluating Abrasion Resistance of Stretch Wrap Films by Vibration Testing
ASTM D6055- Standard Test Methods for Mechanical Handling of Unitized Loads and Large Shipping Cases and Crates
ASTM D6179- Standard Test Methods for Rough Handling of Unitized Loads and Large Shipping Cases and Crates
ISO 10531- Stability testing of unit loads

== Bar codes ==
Package bar codes are evaluated for several aspects of legibility by bar code verifiers as part of a continuing quality program. More thorough validation may include evaluations after use (and abuse) testing such as sunlight, abrasion, impact, moisture, etc.

=== Relevant tests ===
ISO/IEC 15426 Information technology - Automatic identification and data capture techniques - Bar code verifier conformance specification - Part 1: Linear symbols, Part 2: Two-dimensional symbols

== Test protocols for shipping containers ==
Shipping containers are often subjected to sequential tests involving a combination of individual test methods. A variety of standard test schedules or protocols are available for evaluating transport packaging. They are used to help determine the ability of complete and filled shipping containers to various types of logistics systems. Some test the general ruggedness of the shipping container while others have been shown to reproduce the types of damage encountered in distribution. Some base the type and severity of testing on formal studies of the distribution environment: instrumentation, data loggers, and observation. Test cycles with these documented elements better simulate parts of certain logistics shipping environments.

ASTM International

ASTM D4169- Standard Practice for Performance Testing of Shipping Containers and Systems
ASTM D7386- Standard Practice for Performance Testing of Packages for Single Parcel Delivery Systems.

ISO

ISO 4180:2009 Packaging – Complete filled transport packages – General rules for the compilation of performance test schedules

International Safe Transit Association

Procedure 1A: Packaged-Products weighing 150 lb (68 kg) or Less
Procedure 1B: Packaged-Products weighing Over 150 lb (68 kg)
Procedure 1C: Extended Testing for Individual Packaged-Products weighing 150 lb (68 kg) or Less
Procedure 1D: Extended Testing for Individual Packaged-Products weighing Over 150 lb (68 kg)
Procedure 1E: Unitized Loads
Procedure 1G: Packaged-Products weighing 150 lb (68 kg) or Less (Random Vibration)
Procedure 1H: Packaged-Products weighing Over 150 lb (68 kg) (Random Vibration)
Procedure 2A: Packaged-Products weighing 150 lb (68 kg) or Less
Procedure 2B: Packaged-Products weighing over 150 lb (68 kg)
Procedure 2C: Furniture Packages
Procedure 3A: Packaged-Products for Parcel Delivery System Shipments 70 kg (150 lb) or Less (standard, small, flat or elongated)
Procedure 3B: Packaged-Products for Less-Than-Truckload (LTL) Shipment
Procedure 3E: Unitized Loads of Same Product
Procedure 3F: Packaged Products for Distribution Center to Retail Outlet Shipment 100 lb (45 kg)
Procedure 3H: Performance Test for Products or Packaged-Products in Mechanically Handled Bulk Transport Containers
Project 3K: Fast Moving Consumer Goods for the European Retail Supply Chain
Project 4AB: Enhanced Simulation Performance Tests (online test planner)
6-FEDEX-A: FedEx Procedures for Testing Packaged Products Weighing Up to 150 lbs
6-FEDEX-B: FedEx Procedures for Testing Packaged Products Weighing Over 150 lbs
6-SAMSCLUB, Packaged-Products for Sam's Club Distribution System Shipment
Procedure 7D: Thermal Controlled Transport Packaging for Parcel Delivery System Shipment
ISTA 7E: Testing Standard for Thermal Transport Packaging Used in Parcel Delivery System

=== Field trials ===
Laboratory testing can often help identify shipping container constructions that, in general, should perform well in the field. Of course, laboratory tests cannot fully reproduce the full range of field hazards, their magnitudes, nor their frequency. Field experiments are often conducted to help validate the laboratory testing.

The advantage of laboratory testing is that it subjects replicate packages to identical sets of test sequences: a relatively small number of samples often can suffice. Field hazards, by their nature, are highly variable: thus repeated shipments do not receive the same types or magnitudes of drops, vibrations, kicks, impacts, abrasion, etc. Because of this uncontrolled variability, more replicate sample shipments are often necessary.

Larger scale test markets are used to give additional assurance of performance and acceptability for a new or revised packaged-product. Feedback is carefully obtained and evaluated. Feedback on package performance continues when full production and distribution have been achieved.

== Product requirements ==
In addition, package testing often relates to the specific product inside the package. Some broad categories of products and special package testing considerations follow:

=== Food packaging ===
Foods categories such as fresh produce, frozen foods, irradiated foods, fresh fish, canned foods, etc. have regulatory requirements and special packaging needs. Package testing often relates to:

Food safety
Compatibility of the package with the food
Migration of material from the packaging to the food
Shelf life
Barrier properties, porosity, package atmosphere, etc
Special quality assurance needs, good manufacturing practices, HACCP, validation protocols, etc

=== Pharmaceutical packaging ===
Packaging for drugs and pharmaceuticals is highly regulated. Special testing needs include:

Safety of drugs and pharmaceuticals
Barrier properties
Shelf life
Compatibility of package with the drugs
Sterility
Tamper resistance, child resistance, etc
Special quality assurance needs, good manufacturing practices, validation protocols, etc

=== Medical packaging ===
Packaging for medical materials, medical devices, health care supplies, etc., have special user requirements and is highly regulated. Barrier properties, durability, visibility, sterility and strength need to be controlled; usually with documented test results for initial designs and for production.

Assurance of sterility and suitability for use are critical. For example, medical devices and products are often sterilized in the package. The sterility must be maintained throughout distribution to allow immediate use by physicians. A series of special packaging tests is used to measure the ability of the package to maintain sterility. Verification and validation protocols are rigidly maintained.

Relevant standards

ASTM F88/F88M - Standard Test Method for Seal Strength of Flexible Barrier Materials
ASTM F1585 – Guide for Integrity Testing of Porous Medical Packages
ASTM D3078 – Standard Test Method for Detection of Leaks in Flexible Packaging (Bubble)
ASTM F1140 – Standard Test Methods for Internal Pressurization Failure Resistance of Unrestrained Packages
ASTM F1608 – Standard Test Method for Microbial Ranking of Packaging Materials
ASTM F1929 – Standard Test Method for Detecting Seal Strength in Porous Medical Packaging by Dye Penetration
ASTM F1980 – Standard Guide for Accelerated Aging of Sterile Barrier Systems for Medical Devices
ASTM F2054 – Standard Test Method for Burst Testing of Flexible Package Seals Using Internal Air Pressurization Within Restraining Plates
ASTM F2095 – Standard Test Methods for Pressure Decay Leak Test for Flexible Packages With and Without Restraining Plates
ASTM F2096 – Standard Test Method for Detecting Gross Leaks in Medical Packaging by Internal Pressurization
ASTM F2097 – Standard Guide for Design and Evaluation of Primary Flexible Packaging for Medical Products
ASTM F2228 – Standard Test Method for Non-Destructive Detection of Leaks in Medical Packaging Which Incorporates Pourous Barrier Material by CO2 Tracer Gas
ASTM F2391 – Standard Test Method for Measuring Package and Seal Integrity using Helium as the Tracer Gas
ASTM F3039 - Standard Test Method for Detecting Leaks in Nonporous Packaging or Flexible Barrier Materials by Dye Penetration
EN 868-1 – Packaging materials and systems for medical devices which are to be sterilized. General requirements and test methods (superseded by ISO 11607-1)
EN 868-5 – Packaging for terminally sterilized medical devices. Part 5: Sealable pouches and reels of porous materials and plastic film construction - Requirements and test methods. (Per ISO 11607-1, Annex B, Table B.1, this method maybe used to demonstrate conformity with provisions of ISO 11607-1)
ISO 11607-1 – Packaging for terminally sterilized medical devices -- Part 1: Requirements for materials, sterile barrier systems and packaging systems
ISO 11607-2 – Packaging for terminally sterilized medical devices -- Part 2: Validation for Forming, Sealing, and Assembly Processes

=== Dangerous Goods ===
Packaging of hazardous materials, or dangerous goods, are highly regulated. There are some material and construction requirements but also performance testing is required. The testing is based on the packing group (hazard level) of the contents, the quantity of material, and the type of container. Research into improvements is continuing.

Relevant standards
ASTM D4919- Standard Specification for Testing of Hazardous Materials Packaging
ASTM D7387- Standard Test Method for Vibration Testing of Intermediate Bulk Containers (IBCs) Used for Shipping Liquid Hazardous Materials (Dangerous Goods)
ASTM D7760 Standard Guide for Conducting Internal Pressure Tests on United Nations (UN) Packagings
ASTM D7887 Standard Guide for Selection of Substitute, Non-hazardous, Liquid Filling Substances for Packagings Subjected to the United Nations Performance Tests
ASTM D7790: Standard Guide for Preparation of Plastic Packagings Containing Liquids for United Nations (UN) Drop Testing

UN Recommendations on the Transport of Dangerous Goods
ISO 16104 – 2003 Packaging – Transport packaging for dangerous goods – Test methods

== See also ==
- Data analysis
- Nondestructive testing
- Verification and validation
