= Mylar =

Polyester film

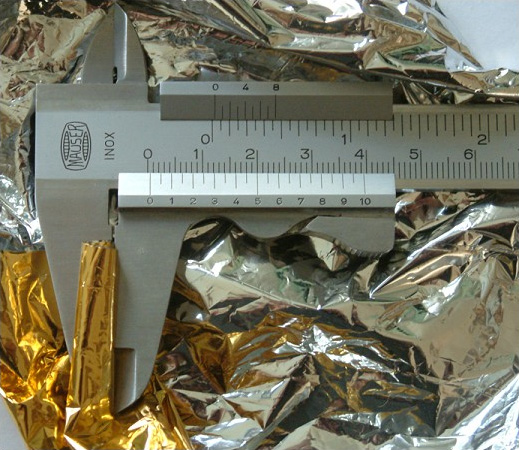
Metallized boPET film, 32 layers of ~14 μm thickness each

BoPET (biaxially oriented polyethylene terephthalate) is a polyester film made from stretched polyethylene terephthalate (PET) and is used for its high tensile strength, chemical stability, dimensional stability, transparency and electrical insulation. When metallized, it has gas and moisture barrier properties and is reflective. The film is "biaxially oriented", which means that the polymer chains are oriented parallel to the plane of the film, and therefore oriented over two axes. A variety of companies manufacture boPET and other polyester films under different brand names. In the UK and US, the best-known trade names are Mylar, Melinex, Lumirror and Hostaphan. It was the first biaxially oriented polymer to be manufactured on a mass commercial scale.

== History ==
BoPET film was developed in the mid-1950s, originally by DuPont, Imperial Chemical Industries (ICI), and Hoechst. Buckminster Fuller used Mylar in 1953 as a skin for a geodesic dome, which he built with students at the University of Oregon. Eastman Kodak used Mylar in 1955 as a support for photographic film and called it "ESTAR Base". The very thin and tough film allowed 6,000-foot (1,800 m) reels to be exposed on long-range U-2 reconnaissance flights. NASA launched Echo II in 1964, a 40-metre (131 ft) diameter balloon constructed from a 9-micrometre (0.00035 in) thick boPET film sandwiched between two layers of 4.5-micrometre (0.00018 in) thick aluminium foil bonded together.

== Manufacture and properties ==
Chemical structure of polyethylene terephthalate

The manufacturing process begins with a film of molten polyethylene terephthalate (PET) being extruded onto a chill roll, which quenches it into the amorphous state. It is then biaxially oriented by drawing. The most common way of doing this is the sequential process, in which the film is first drawn in the machine direction using heated rollers and subsequently drawn in the transverse direction, i.e., orthogonally to the direction of travel, in a heated oven. It is also possible to draw the film in both directions simultaneously, although the equipment required for this is somewhat more elaborate. Draw ratios are typically around 3 to 4 in each direction.

Once the drawing is completed, the film is "heat set" and crystallized under tension in the oven at temperatures typically above 200 °C (392 °F). The heat setting step prevents the film from shrinking back to its original unstretched shape and locks in the molecular orientation in the film plane. The orientation of the polymer chains is responsible for the high strength and stiffness of biaxially oriented PET film, which has a typical Young's modulus of about 4 GPa (0.58×10^{6} psi). Another important consequence of the molecular orientation is that it induces the formation of many crystal nuclei. The crystallites that grow rapidly reach the boundary of the neighboring crystallite and remain smaller than the wavelength of visible light. As a result, biaxially oriented PET film has excellent clarity, despite its semicrystalline structure.

If it were produced without any additives, the surface of the film would be so smooth that layers would adhere strongly to one another when the film is wound up, similar to the sticking of clean glass plates when stacked. To make handling possible, microscopic inert inorganic particles, such as silicon dioxide, are usually embedded in the PET to roughen the surface of the film.

Biaxially oriented PET film can be metallized by vapor deposition of a thin film of evaporated aluminium, gold, or other metal onto it. The result is much less permeable to gases (important in food packaging) and reflects up to 99% of light, including much of the infrared spectrum. For some applications like food packaging, the aluminized boPET film can be laminated with a layer of polyethylene, which provides sealability and improves puncture resistance. The polyethylene side of such a laminate appears dull and the boPET side shiny. Other coatings, such as conductive indium tin oxide (ITO), can be applied to boPET film by sputter deposition.

== Applications ==
Uses for boPET polyester films include, but are not limited to:

=== Flexible packaging and food contact ===
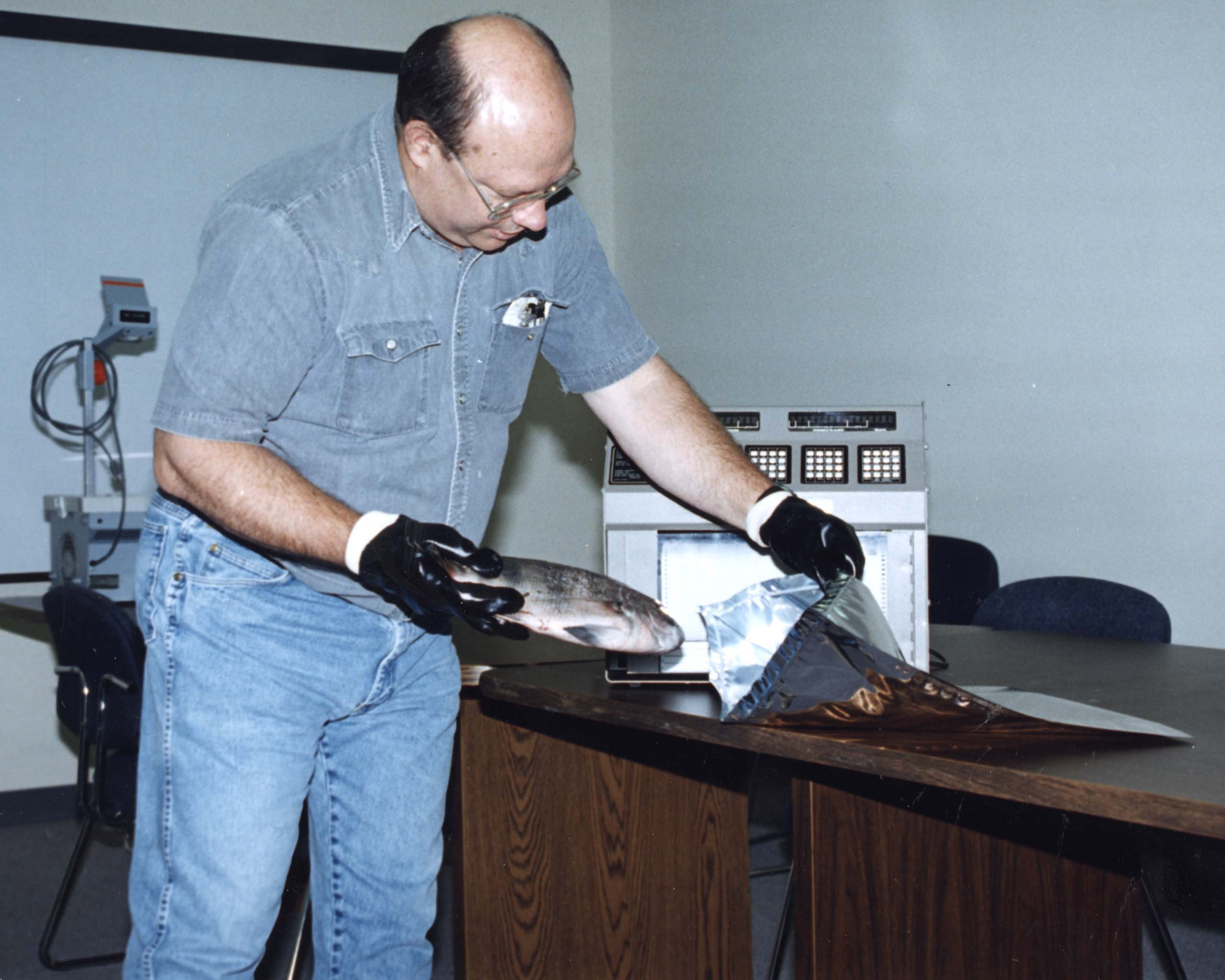
NASA's Technology Transfer Office at Stennis Space Center worked with a New Orleans seafood packaging company to develop a container to improve the shipping longevity of seafood, primarily frozen and fresh fish, while preserving the taste. A NASA engineer developed metalized heat resistant polybags with thermal foam liners using an enhanced version of the metalized mylar commonly known as "space blanket material," which was produced during the Apollo era.

- Laminates containing metallized boPET foil (in technical language called printin or laminate web substrate) protect food against oxidation and aroma loss, achieving long shelf life. Examples are coffee "foil" packaging and pouches for convenience foods.
- Pop-Tarts toaster pastries are sold in pairs wrapped in silver boPET. They were previously wrapped in foil.
- White boPET web substrate is used as lidding for dairy goods such as yogurt.
- Clear boPET web substrate is used as lidding for fresh or frozen ready meals. Due to its excellent heat resistance, it can remain on the package during microwave or oven heating.
- boPET is used as a material for roasting bags
- Metallised film is related to boPET
- Laminated sheet metal (aluminium or steel) used in the manufacture of cans (bisphenol A-free alternative to lacquers) has some relationship with boPET

=== Covering over paper ===
- A clear overlay on a map, on which notations, additional data, or copied data, can be drawn without damaging the map
- Metallized boPET is used as a mirror-like decorative surface on some book covers, T-shirts, and other flexible cloths.
- Protective covering over buttons/pins/badges
- The glossy top layer of a Polaroid SX-70 photographic print
- As a backing for very fine sandpaper
- boPET film is used in bagging comic books, in order to best protect them during storage from environmental conditions (moisture, heat, and cold) that would otherwise cause paper to slowly deteriorate over time. This material is used for archival quality storage of documents by the Library of Congress (Mylar type D, ICI Melinex 516 or equivalent) and several major library comic book research collections, including the Comic Art Collection at Michigan State University. While boPET is widely (and effectively) used in this archival sense, it is not immune to the effects of fire and heat and could potentially melt, depending on the intensity of the heat source, causing further damage to the encased item.
- Similarly, trading card decks (such as Pokémon, Magic: The Gathering, and Yu-Gi-Oh!) are packaged in pouches or sleeves made of metallized boPET. It can also be used to make the holographic artwork featured on some cards, typically known as "holos", "foils", "shinies", or "holofoils".
- For protecting the spine of important documents, such as medical records.

=== Insulating material ===
- An electrical insulating material
- Insulation for houses and tents, reflecting thermal radiation
- Five layers of metallized boPET film in NASA's spacesuits make them radiation resistant and help regulate temperature.
- Metallized boPET film emergency blankets conserve a shock victim's body heat.
- As a thin strip to form an airtight seal between the control surfaces and adjacent structure of aircraft, especially gliders.
- Light insulation for indoor gardening.
- Aluminized proximity suits used by fire fighters for protection from the high amount of heat release from fuel fires.
- Used in sock and glove liners to lock in warmth
- Gasketing material in fuel cells and related devices

=== Solar, marine, and aviation ===
- Metallized boPET is intended to be used for solar sails as an alternative means of propulsion for spacecraft such as Cosmos 1
- Translucent Mylar film, as wide as 4 feet (1.2 m) and up to 12 feet (3.7 m) in length, found widespread use as a non-dimensional engineering drawing media in the aerospace industry due to its dimensional stability (also see Printing Media section below). This allows production and engineering staff to lay manufactured parts directly over or under the drawing film in order to verify the fidelity of part profiles, hole locations and other part features.
- Metallized boPET solar curtains, to reflect sunlight and heat away from windows.
- Aluminized, as an inexpensive solar eclipse viewer.
- High performance sails for sailboats, hang gliders, paragliders and kites
- As the back face of the PV modules in solar panels.
- To bridge control surface gaps on sailplanes (gliders), reducing profile drag.

=== Science ===
- Amateur and professional visual and telescopic solar filters. BoPET films are often annealed to a glass element in telescopic applications for stability.
- Films in annular ring mounts on gas-tight cells, which will readily deform into spherical mirrors. Photomultiplier cosmic-ray observatories often make use of these mirrors.
- As a light diaphragm material separating gases in hypersonic shock and expansion tube facilities.
- As a beamsplitter in Fourier transform infrared spectroscopy, typically with laser applications.
- Coating around hematocrit tubes.
- Insulating material for a cryocooler radiation shield.
- As a window material to confine gas in detectors and targets in nuclear physics.
- In CT scanners it acts as a physical barrier between the X-ray tube, detector ring and the patient allowing negligible attenuation of the X-ray beam when active.
- Spacecraft are insulated with a metallized BoPET film.

=== Electronic and acoustic ===
- Carrier for flexible printed circuits.
- BoPET film is often used as the diaphragm material in headphones, electrostatic loudspeakers and microphones.
- BoPET film has been used in the production of banjos and drumheads since 1958 due to its durability and acoustical properties when stretched over the bearing edge of the drum. They are made in single- and double-ply versions, with each ply being 2–10 mils (0.051–0.254 mm) in thickness, with a transparent or opaque surface, originally used by the company Evans.
- BoPET film is used as the substrate in practically all magnetic recording tapes and floppy disks.
- Metallized boPET film, along with other plastic films, is used as a dielectric in foil capacitors.
- Clear boPET bags are used as packaging for audio media such as compact discs and vinyl records.
- Clear and white boPET films are used as core layers and overlays in smart cards.

=== Printing media ===
- Before the widespread adoption of computer aided design (CAD), engineering drawings or architectural drawings were plotted onto sheets of boPET film, known as drafting film. The boPET sheets become legal documents from which copies or blueprints are made. boPET sheets are more durable and can withstand more handling than bond paper. Although "blueprint" duplication has fallen out of use, mylar is still used for its archival properties, typically as a record set of plans for building departments to keep on file.
- Overhead transparency film for photocopiers or laser printers (boPET film withstands the high heat).
- Modern lithography printing plates aka "Pronto Plates" (boPET resists oil)

=== Other ===
- Balloons, metallic balloons
- Route information signs, called rollsigns or destination blinds, displayed by public transport vehicles
- For materials in kites
- Covering glass to decrease probability of shattering
- In theatre effects such as confetti
- As the adhesive strip to attach the string to a teabag
- One of the many materials used as windsavers or valves for valved harmonicas
- On farmland and domestic gardens, highly reflective aluminized PET film ribbons are used to keep birds away from plants
- Measuring tape
- Protecting pinball machine playfields from wear
- Used in dentistry when restoring teeth with composite
- In nail polish, as a coloured and finely shredded additive to create a glitter effect
- Numismatics – Storing coins for long periods of time. PVC was previously used for this, but over long periods of time PVC can release chlorine, which reacts with the silver and copper in coins. BoPET does not have this problem.
- In fishing fly tying, metallized Mylar strips are sometimes wound around the hook shank for reflective striping or shimmer in certain patterns.
- Military uniform accoutrements are often accented by gold mylar, such as shoulder epaulets or shoulder knots. For example: US Army Officer's Mess Dress Uniform.
- In flags to create a shimmering sound in live performance.

== See also ==
- Kapton
