= WVTR =

WVTR may refer to:

- Water vapor transmission rate, a measure of the passage of water vapor through a substance
- WVTR (FM), a radio station in Roanoke, Virginia, United States
