= Carbon dioxide transmission rate =

Carbon dioxide transmission rate (COTR) is the measurement of the amount of carbon dioxide gas that passes through a substance over a given period. It is mostly carried out on non-porous materials, where the mode of transport is diffusion, but there are a growing number of applications where the transmission rate also depends on flow through apertures of some description.

== See also ==
- Moisture vapor transmission rate
- Permeation
- Oxygen transmission rate
- Packaging
