= Thermal expansivities of the elements =

Chemical data page

== Thermal expansion ==
| | μm · m^{−1} · K^{−1} |
3 Li lithium
| use | 46 |
| CRC | 46 |
| LNG | 46 |
| WEL | 46 |
4 Be beryllium
| use | 11.3 |
| CRC | 11.3 |
| LNG | 11.3 |
| WEL | 11.3 |
5 B boron
| use | 5–7 |
| LNG | 5–7 |
| WEL | 6 |
6 C carbon
| use | |
| WEL | 7.1 |
11 Na sodium
| use | 71 |
| CRC | 71 |
| LNG | 71 |
| WEL | 71 |
12 Mg magnesium
| use | 24.8 |
| CRC | 24.8 |
| LNG | 24.8 |
| WEL | 8.2 |
13 Al aluminium
| use | 23.1 |
| CRC | 23.1 |
| LNG | 23.1 |
| WEL | 23.1 |
14 Si silicon
| use | 2.6 |
| WEL | 2.6 |
19 K potassium
| use | 83.3 |
| CRC | 83.3 |
20 Ca calcium
| use | 22.3 |
| CRC | 22.3 |
| LNG | 22.3 |
| WEL | 22.3 |
21 Sc scandium
| use | (room temperature) (alpha, polycrystalline) 10.2 |
| CRC | 10.2 |
| CR2 | (room temperature) (alpha, amorphous) 7.6 |
| CR2 | (room temperature) (alpha, crystalline) 15.3 |
| CR2 | (room temperature) (alpha, polycrystalline) 10.2 |
| LNG | 10.2 |
| WEL | 10.2 |
22 Ti titanium
| use | 8.6 |
| CRC | 8.6 |
| LNG | 8.6 |
| WEL | 8.6 |
23 V vanadium
| use | 8.4 |
| CRC | 8.4 |
| LNG | 8.4 |
| WEL | 8.4 |
24 Cr chromium
| use | 4.9 |
| CRC | 4.9 |
| LNG | 4.9 |
| WEL | 4.9 |
25 Mn manganese
| use | 21.7 |
| CRC | 21.7 |
| LNG | 21.7 |
| WEL | 21.7 |
26 Fe iron
| use | 11.8 |
| CRC | 11.8 |
| LNG | 11.8 |
| WEL | 11.8 |
27 Co cobalt
| use | 13.0 |
| CRC | 13.0 |
| LNG | 13.0 |
| WEL | 13.0 |
28 Ni nickel
| use | 13.4 |
| CRC | 13.4 |
| LNG | 13.4 |
| WEL | 13.4 |
29 Cu copper
| use | 16.5 |
| CRC | 16.5 |
| LNG | 16.5 |
| WEL | 16.5 |
30 Zn zinc
| use | 30.2 |
| CRC | 30.2 |
| LNG | 30.2 |
| WEL | 30.2 |
31 Ga gallium
| use | |
| CRC | 18 |
| LNG | (>30 C) ( liquid) 120 |
| WEL | (>30 C) (liquid) 120 |
32 Ge germanium
| use | 6.0 |
| LNG | 6.0 |
| WEL | 6 |
34 Se selenium
| use | (amorphous) 37 |
| LNG | (amorphous) 37 |
38 Sr strontium
| use | 22.5 |
| CRC | 22.5 |
| LNG | 22.5 |
| WEL | 22.5 |
39 Y yttrium
| use | (room temperature) (alpha, polycrystalline) 10.6 |
| CRC | 10.6 |
| CR2 | (room temperature) (alpha, amorphous) 6.0 |
| CR2 | (room temperature) (alpha, crystalline) 19.7 |
| CR2 | (room temperature) (alpha, polycrystalline) 10.6 |
| LNG | 10.6 |
| WEL | 10.6 |
40 Zr zirconium
| use | 5.7 |
| CRC | 5.7 |
| LNG | 5.7 |
| WEL | 5.7 |
41 Nb niobium
| use | 7.3 |
| CRC | 7.3 |
| LNG | 7.3 |
| WEL | 7.3 |
42 Mo molybdenum
| use | 4.8 |
| CRC | 4.8 |
| LNG | 4.8 |
| WEL | 4.8 |
44 Ru ruthenium
| use | 6.4 |
| CRC | 6.4 |
| LNG | 6.4 |
| WEL | 6.4 |
45 Rh rhodium
| use | 8.2 |
| CRC | 8.2 |
| LNG | 8.2 |
| WEL | 8.2 |
46 Pd palladium
| use | 11.8 |
| CRC | 11.8 |
| LNG | 11.8 |
| WEL | 11.8 |
47 Ag silver
| use | 18.9 |
| CRC | 18.9 |
| LNG | 18.9 |
| WEL | 18.9 |
48 Cd cadmium
| use | 30.8 |
| CRC | 30.8 |
| LNG | 30.8 |
| WEL | 30.8 |
49 In indium
| use | 32.1 |
| CRC | 32.1 |
| LNG | 32.1 |
| WEL | 32.1 |
50 Sn tin
| use | 22.0 |
| CRC | 22.0 |
| LNG | 22.0 |
| WEL | 22 |
51 Sb antimony
| use | 11.0 |
| CRC | 11.0 |
| LNG | 11.0 |
| WEL | 11 |
55 Cs caesium
| use | 97 |
| CRC | 97 |
56 Ba barium
| use | 20.6 |
| CRC | 20.6 |
| LNG | 20.6 |
| WEL | 20.6 |
57 La lanthanum
| use | (room temperature) (alpha, polycrystalline) 12.1 |
| CRC | 12.1 |
| CR2 | (room temperature) (alpha, amorphous) 4.5 |
| CR2 | (room temperature) (alpha, crystalline) 27.2 |
| CR2 | (room temperature) (alpha, polycrystalline) 12.1 |
| LNG | 12.1 |
| WEL | 12.1 |
58 Ce cerium
| use | (room temperature) (gamma, polycrystalline) 6.3 |
| CRC | 6.3 |
| CR2 | (room temperature) (gamma, amorphous) 6.3 |
| CR2 | (room temperature) (gamma, polycrystalline) 6.3 |
| LNG | 6.3 |
| WEL | 6.3 |
59 Pr praseodymium
| use | (room temperature) (alpha, polycrystalline) 6.7 |
| CRC | 6.7 |
| CR2 | (room temperature) (alpha, amorphous) 4.5 |
| CR2 | (room temperature) (alpha, crystalline) 11.2 |
| CR2 | (room temperature) (alpha, polycrystalline) 6.7 |
| LNG | 6.7 |
| WEL | 6.7 |
60 Nd neodymium
| use | (room temperature) (alpha, polycrystalline) 9.6 |
| CRC | 9.6 |
| CR2 | (room temperature) (alpha, amorphous) 7.6 |
| CR2 | (room temperature) (alpha, crystalline) 13.5 |
| CR2 | (room temperature) (alpha, polycrystalline) 9.6 |
| LNG | 9.6 |
| WEL | 9.6 |
61 Pm promethium
| use | (room temperature) (alpha, polycrystalline) est. 11 |
| CRC | est. 11 |
| CR2 | (room temperature) (alpha, amorphous) est. 9 |
| CR2 | (room temperature) (alpha, crystalline) est. 16 |
| CR2 | (room temperature) (alpha, polycrystalline) est. 11 |
| LNG | est. 11 |
| WEL | 11 |
62 Sm samarium
| use | (room temperature) (alpha, polycrystalline) 12.7 |
| CRC | 12.7 |
| CR2 | (room temperature) (alpha, amorphous) 9.6 |
| CR2 | (room temperature) (alpha, crystalline) 19.0 |
| CR2 | (room temperature) (alpha, polycrystalline) 12.7 |
| LNG | 12.7 |
| WEL | 12.7 |
63 Eu europium
| use | (room temperature) (polycrystalline) 35.0 |
| CRC | 35.0 |
| CR2 | (room temperature) (amorphous) 35.0 |
| CR2 | (room temperature) (polycrystalline) 35.0 |
| LNG | 35.0 |
| WEL | 35 |
64 Gd gadolinium
| use | (100 °C) (alpha, polycrystalline) 9.4 |
| CRC | (100 °C) 9.4 |
| CR2 | (100 °C) (alpha, amorphous) 9.1 |
| CR2 | (100 °C) (alpha, crystalline) 10.0 |
| CR2 | (100 °C) (alpha, polycrystalline) 9.4 |
| LNG | (100 °C) 9.4 |
| WEL | 9.4 |
65 Tb terbium
| use | (room temperature) (alpha, polycrystalline) 10.3 |
| CRC | 10.3 |
| CR2 | (room temperature) (alpha, amorphous) 9.3 |
| CR2 | (room temperature) (alpha, crystalline) 12.4 |
| CR2 | (room temperature) (alpha, polycrystalline) 10.3 |
| LNG | 10.3 |
| WEL | 10.3 |
66 Dy dysprosium
| use | (room temperature) (alpha, polycrystalline) 9.9 |
| CRC | 9.9 |
| CR2 | (room temperature) (alpha, amorphous) 7.1 |
| CR2 | (room temperature) (alpha, crystalline) 15.6 |
| CR2 | (room temperature) (alpha, polycrystalline) 9.9 |
| LNG | 9.9 |
| WEL | 9.9 |
67 Ho holmium
| use | (room temperature) (polycrystalline) 11.2 |
| CRC | 11.2 |
| CR2 | (room temperature) (amorphous) 7.0 |
| CR2 | (room temperature) (crystalline) 19.5 |
| CR2 | (room temperature) (polycrystalline) 11.2 |
| LNG | 11.2 |
| WEL | 11.2 |
68 Er erbium
| use | (room temperature) (polycrystalline) 12.2 |
| CRC | 12.2 |
| CR2 | (room temperature) (amorphous) 7.9 |
| CR2 | (room temperature) (crystalline) 20.9 |
| CR2 | (room temperature) (polycrystalline) 12.2 |
| LNG | 12.2 |
| WEL | 12.2 |
69 Tm thulium
| use | (room temperature) (polycrystalline) 13.3 |
| CRC | 13.3 |
| CR2 | (room temperature) (amorphous) 8.8 |
| CR2 | (room temperature) (crystalline) 22.2 |
| CR2 | (room temperature) (polycrystalline) 13.3 |
| LNG | 13.3 |
| WEL | 13.3 |
70 Yb ytterbium
| use | (room temperature) (beta, polycrystalline) 26.3 |
| CRC | 26.3 |
| CR2 | (room temperature) (beta, amorphous) 26.3 |
| CR2 | (room temperature) (beta, polycrystalline) 26.3 |
| LNG | 26.3 |
| WEL | 26.3 |
71 Lu lutetium
| use | (room temperature) (polycrystalline) 9.9 |
| CRC | 9.9 |
| CR2 | (room temperature) (amorphous) 4.8 |
| CR2 | (room temperature) (crystalline) 20.0 |
| CR2 | (room temperature) (polycrystalline) 9.9 |
| LNG | 9.9 |
| WEL | 9.9 |
72 Hf hafnium
| use | 5.9 |
| CRC | 5.9 |
| LNG | 5.9 |
| WEL | 5.9 |
73 Ta tantalum
| use | 6.3 |
| CRC | 6.3 |
| LNG | 6.3 |
| WEL | 6.3 |
74 W tungsten
| use | 4.5 |
| CRC | 4.5 |
| LNG | 4.5 |
| WEL | 4.5 |
75 Re rhenium
| use | 6.2 |
| CRC | 6.2 |
| LNG | 6.2 |
| WEL | 6.2 |
76 Os osmium
| use | 5.1 |
| CRC | 5.1 |
| LNG | 5.1 |
| WEL | 5.1 |
77 Ir iridium
| use | 6.4 |
| CRC | 6.4 |
| LNG | 6.4 |
| WEL | 6.4 |
78 Pt platinum
| use | 8.8 |
| CRC | 8.8 |
| LNG | 8.8 |
| WEL | 8.8 |
79 Au gold
| use | 14.2 |
| CRC | 14.2 |
| LNG | 14.2 |
| WEL | 14.2 |
80 Hg mercury
| use | 60.4 |
| CRC | 60.4 |
81 Tl thallium
| use | 29.9 |
| CRC | 29.9 |
| LNG | 29.9 |
| WEL | 29.9 |
82 Pb lead
| use | 28.9 |
| CRC | 28.9 |
| LNG | 28.9 |
| WEL | 28.9 |
83 Bi bismuth
| use | 13.4 |
| CRC | 13.4 |
| LNG | 13.4 |
| WEL | 13.4 |
84 Po polonium
| use | 23.5 |
| CRC | 23.5 |
90 Th thorium
| use | 11.0 |
| CRC | 11.0 |
| LNG | 11.1 |
| WEL | 11.0 |
92 U uranium
| use | 13.9 |
| CRC | 13.9 |
| LNG | 13.9 |
| WEL | 13.9 |
94 Pu plutonium
| use | 46.7 |
| CRC | 46.7 |
| LNG | 46.7 |

== Notes ==
All values refer to 25 °C unless noted.
