= Shelf life =

Length of time that a commodity may be stored before it degrades

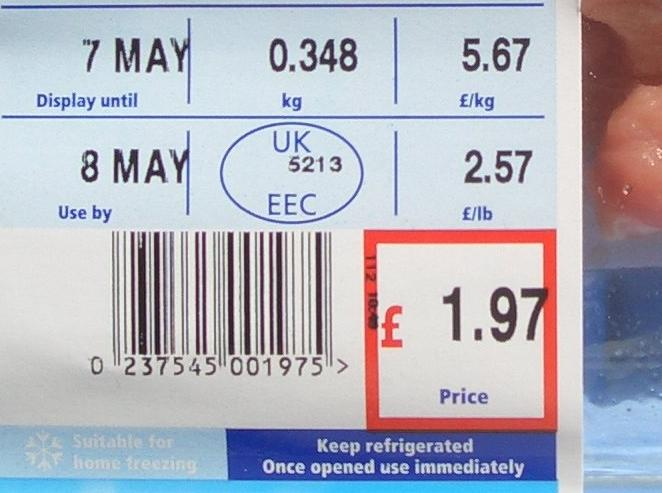
This pack of diced pork says 'Display until' 7 May and 'Use by' 8 May.

Shelf life is the length of time that a commodity may be stored without becoming unfit for use, consumption, or sale. In other words, it might refer to whether a commodity should no longer be on a pantry shelf (unfit for use), or no longer on a supermarket shelf (unfit for sale, but not yet unfit for use). It applies to cosmetics, foods and beverages, medical devices, medicines, explosives, pharmaceutical drugs, chemicals, tyres, batteries, and many other perishable items. In some regions, an advisory best before, mandatory use by or freshness date is required on packaged perishable foods. The concept of expiration date is related but legally distinct in some jurisdictions.

== Background ==
Shelf life is the recommended maximum time for which products or fresh (harvested) produce can be stored, during which the defined quality of a specified proportion of the goods remains acceptable under expected (or specified) conditions of distribution, storage and display.

According to the United States Department of Agriculture (USDA), most "canned foods are safe indefinitely as long as they are not exposed to freezing temperatures, or temperatures above 90 °F (32.2 °C)". Not all canned goods are shelf-stable and those labeled "keep refrigerated" are not safe to store at room temperature. Rusted, swollen and dented cans may not be safe for consumption. Over time, most notably for high acid foods such as tomatoes, food stored in cans will change in taste and texture and will eventually have lowered nutritional value.

"Sell by date" is a less ambiguous term for what is often referred to as an "expiration date". Most food is still edible after the expiration date. A product that has passed its shelf life might still be safe, but quality is no longer guaranteed. In most food stores, waste is minimized by using stock rotation, which involves moving products with the earliest sell by date from the warehouse to the sales area, and then to the front of the shelf, so that most shoppers will pick them up first and thus they are likely to be sold before the end of their shelf life. Some stores can be fined for selling out of date products; most if not all would have to mark such products down as wasted, resulting in a financial loss.

Shelf life depends on the degradation mechanism of the specific product. Most can be influenced by several factors: exposure to light, heat, moisture, transmission of gases, mechanical stresses, and contamination by things such as micro-organisms. Product quality is often mathematically modelled around a parameter (concentration of a chemical compound, a microbiological index, or moisture content).

For some foods, health issues are important in determining shelf life. Bacterial contaminants are ubiquitous, and foods left unused too long will often be contaminated by substantial amounts of bacterial colonies and become dangerous to eat, leading to food poisoning. However, shelf life alone is not an accurate indicator of how long the food can safely be stored. For example, pasteurized milk can remain fresh for five days after its sell-by date if it is refrigerated properly. However, improper storage of milk may result in bacterial contamination or spoilage before the expiration date.

=== Pharmaceuticals ===
The expiration date of pharmaceuticals specifies the date the manufacturer guarantees the full potency and safety of a drug. Most medications continue to be effective and safe for a time after the expiration date. A rare exception is a case of renal tubular acidosis purportedly caused by expired tetracycline. A study conducted by the U.S. Food and Drug Administration covered over 100 drugs, prescription and over-the-counter. The study showed that about 90% of them were safe and effective as long as 15 years past their expiration dates. Joel Davis, a former FDA expiration-date compliance chief, said that with a handful of exceptions - notably nitroglycerin, insulin and some liquid antibiotics - most expired drugs are probably effective.

Shelf life is not significantly studied during drug development, and drug manufacturers have economic and liability incentives to specify shorter shelf lives so that consumers are encouraged to discard and repurchase products. One major exception is the Shelf Life Extension Program (SLEP) of the U.S. Department of Defense (DoD), which commissioned a major study of drug efficacy from the FDA starting in the mid-1980s. One criticism is that the U.S. Food and Drug Administration (FDA) refused to issue guidelines based on SLEP research for normal marketing of pharmaceuticals even though the FDA performed the study. The SLEP and FDA signed a memorandum that scientific data could not be shared with the public, public health departments, other government agencies, and drug manufacturers. State and local programs are not permitted to participate. The failure to share data has caused foreign governments to refuse donations of expired medications. One exception occurred during the 2010 Swine Flu Epidemic when the FDA authorized expired Tamiflu based on SLEP Data. The SLEP discovered that drugs such as Cipro remained effective nine years after their shelf life, and, as a cost-saving measure, the US military routinely uses a wide range of SLEP tested products past their official shelf life if drugs have been stored properly.

=== Packaging factors ===
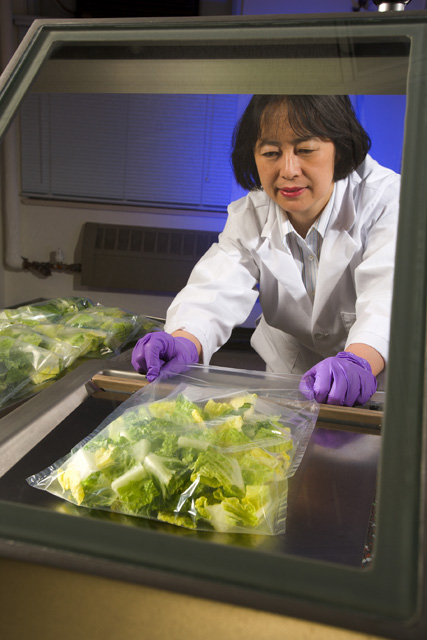
Package testing: heat sealing film for evaluation of shelf life of lettuce

Preservatives and antioxidants may be incorporated into some food and drug products to extend their shelf life. Some companies use induction sealing and vacuum/oxygen-barrier pouches to assist in the extension of the shelf life of their products where oxygen causes the loss.

The DoD Shelf-Life Program defines shelf-life as

The total period of time beginning with the date of manufacture, date of cure (for elastomeric and rubber products only), date of assembly, or date of pack (subsistence only), and terminated by the date by which an item must be used (expiration date) or subjected to inspection, test, restoration, or disposal action; or after inspection/laboratory test/restorative action that an item may remain in the combined wholesale (including manufacture's) and retail storage systems and still be suitable for issue or use by the end user. Shelf-life is not to be confused with service-life (defined as, A general term used to quantify the average or standard life expectancy of an item or equipment while in use. When a shelf-life item is unpacked and introduced to mission requirements, installed into intended application, or merely left in storage, placed in pre-expended bins, or held as bench stock, shelf-life management stops and service life begins.)

Shelf life is often specified in conjunction with a specific product, package, and distribution system. For example, an MRE field ration is designed to have a shelf life of three years at 80 °F (27 °C) and six months at 100 °F (38 °C).

== Temperature control ==
Nearly all chemical reactions can occur at normal temperatures (although different reactions proceed at different rates). However most reactions are accelerated by high temperatures, and the degradation of foods and pharmaceuticals is no exception. The same applies to the breakdown of many chemical explosives into more unstable compounds. Nitroglycerine is notorious. Old explosives are thus more dangerous (i.e. liable to be triggered to explode by very small disturbances, even trivial jiggling) than more recently manufactured explosives. Rubber products also degrade as sulphur bonds induced during vulcanization revert; this is why old rubber bands and other rubber products soften and get crispy, and lose their elasticity as they age.

The often quoted rule of thumb is that chemical reactions double their rate for each temperature increase of 10 °C (18 °F) because activation energy barriers are more easily surmounted at higher temperatures. However, as with many rules of thumb, there are many caveats and exceptions. The rule works best for reactions with activation energy values around 50 kJ/mole; many of these are important at the usual temperatures we encounter. It is often applied in shelf life estimation, sometimes wrongly. There is a widespread impression, for instance in industry, that "triple time" can be simulated in practice by increasing the temperature by 15 °C (27 °F), e.g., storing a product for one month at 35 °C (95 °F) simulates three months at 20 °C (68 °F). This is mathematically incorrect (if the rule was precisely accurate the required temperature increase would be about 15.8 °C (28.4 °F)), and in any case the rule is only a rough approximation and cannot always be relied on. Chemists often use the more comprehensive Arrhenius equation for better estimations.

The same is true, up to a point, of the chemical reactions of living things. They are usually catalyzed by enzymes which change reaction rates, but with no variation in catalytic action, the rule of thumb is still mostly applicable. In the case of bacteria and fungi, the reactions needed to feed and reproduce speed up at higher temperatures, up to the point that the proteins and other compounds in their cells themselves begin to break down, or denature, so quickly that they cannot be replaced. This is why high temperatures kill bacteria and other micro-organisms: 'tissue' breakdown reactions reach such rates that they cannot be compensated for and the cell dies. On the other hand, 'elevated' temperatures short of these result in increased growth and reproduction; if the organism is harmful, perhaps to dangerous levels.

Just as temperature increases speed up reactions, temperature decreases reduce them. Therefore, to make explosives stable for longer periods, or to keep rubber bands springy, or to force bacteria to slow down their growth, they can be cooled. That is why shelf life is generally extended by temperature control: (refrigeration, insulated shipping containers, controlled cold chain, etc.) and why some medicines and foods must be refrigerated. Since such storing of such goods is temporal in nature and shelf life is dependent on the temperature controlled environment, they are also referred to as cargo even when in special storage to emphasize the inherent time-temperature sensitivity matrix.

Temperature data loggers and time temperature indicators can record the temperature history of a shipment to help estimate their remaining shelf life.

According to the USDA, "Frozen foods remain safe indefinitely". Small increases in temperature can significantly accelerate many non-biological degradation pathways because reaction rates often follow an Arrhenius-type dependence, where rate constants increase exponentially with temperature.

== Packaging ==
Passive barrier packaging can often help control or extend shelf life by blocking the transmission of deleterious substances, like moisture or oxygen, across the barrier. Active packaging, on the other hand, employs the use of substances that scavenge, capture, or otherwise render harmless deleterious substances. When moisture content is a mechanism for product degradation, packaging with a low moisture vapor transmission rate and the use of desiccants help keep the moisture in the package within acceptable limits. When oxidation is the primary concern, packaging with a low oxygen transmission rate and the use of oxygen absorbers can help extend the shelf life. Produce and other products with respiration often require packaging with controlled barrier properties. The use of a modified atmosphere in the package can extend the shelf life for some products.

== Related concepts ==
The concept of shelf life applies to other products besides food and drugs. Gasoline has a shelf life, although it is not normally necessary to display a sell-by date. Exceeding this time-frame will introduce harmful varnishes, etc. into equipment designed to operate with these products, i.e. a gasoline lawn mower that has not been properly winterized could incur damage that will prevent use in the spring, and require expensive servicing to the carburetor.

Some glues and adhesives also have a limited storage life, and will stop working in a reliable and usable manner if their safe shelf life is exceeded.

Rather different is the use of a time limit for the use of items like vouchers, gift certificates and pre-paid phone cards, so that after the displayed date the voucher etc. will no longer be valid. Bell Mobility and its parent company, BCE Inc. have been served with notice of a $100-million class-action lawsuit alleging that expiry dates on its pre-paid wireless services are illegal.

== See also ==
- Accelerated aging
- Cold chain
- Digital permanence
- Expiration date
- Failure rate
- Food waste
- Inventory turnover
- Modified atmosphere
- Moisture sorption isotherm
- Moisture vapor transmission rate
- Packaging and labelling
- Permeation
- Planned obsolescence
- Redox
- Shelf stable
- Yellow sticker
