= Perm (unit) =

Unit of permeance

A perm is a unit of permeance or "water vapor transmission" given a certain differential in partial pressures on either side of a material or membrane.

== Definitions ==
U.S. perm
The U.S. perm is defined as 1 grain of water vapor per hour, per square foot, per inch of mercury.

1 U.S. perm	= 0.659045 metric perms
	≈ 57.2135 ng·s^{−1}·m^{−2}·Pa^{−1}

Metric perm
The metric perm (not an SI unit) is defined as 1 gram of water vapor per day, per square meter, per millimeter of mercury.

1 metric perm	= 1.51735 U.S. perms
	≈ 86.8127 ng·s^{−1}·m^{−2}·Pa^{−1}

Equivalent SI unit
The equivalent SI measure is the nanogram per second per square meter per pascal.

1 ng·s^{−1}·m^{−2}·Pa^{−1}	≈ 0.0174784 U.S. perms
	≈ 0.0115191 metric perms

The base normal SI unit for permeance is the kilogram per second per square meter per pascal.

1 kg·s^{−1}·m^{−2}·Pa^{−1}	≈ 1.74784×10^{10} U.S. perms
	≈ 1.15191×10^{10} metric perms

== German Institute for Standardization unit ==
A variant of the metric perm is used in DIN Standard 53122, where permeance is also expressed in grams per square meter per day, but at a fixed, "standard" vapor-pressure difference of 17.918 mmHg. This unit is thus 17.918 times smaller than a metric perm, corresponding to about 0.084683 of a U.S. perm.
