= Moisture vapor transmission rate =

Measure of the passage of water vapor through a substance

Moisture vapor transmission rate (MVTR), also water vapor transmission rate (WVTR), is a measure of the passage of water vapor through a substance. It is a measure of the permeability for vapor barriers.

There are many industries where moisture control is critical. Moisture sensitive foods and pharmaceuticals are put in packaging with controlled MVTR to achieve the required quality, safety, and shelf life. In clothing, MVTR as a measure of breathability has contributed to greater comfort for wearers of clothing for outdoor activity. The building materials industry also manages the moisture barrier properties in architectural components to ensure the correct moisture levels in the internal spaces of buildings. Optoelectronic devices based on organic material, generally named OLEDs, need an encapsulation with low values of WVTR to guarantee the same performances over the lifetime of the device.

MVTR generally decreases with increasing thickness of the film/barrier, and increases with increasing temperature difference between inside and outside of the barrier/membrane under consideration.

== Measurement ==
There are various techniques to measure MVTR, ranging from gravimetric techniques that measure the gain or loss of moisture by mass, to highly sophisticated instrumental techniques that in some designs can measure extremely low transmission rates. Special care has to be taken in measuring porous substances such as fabrics, as some techniques are not appropriate. For very low levels, many techniques do not have adequate resolution. Numerous standard methods are described in ISO, ASTM, BS, DIN etc.—these are quite often industry-specific. Instrument manufacturers are often able to provide test methods developed to fully exploit the specific design which they are selling. The search for the most appropriate instrument is a zealous task which is in itself part of the measurement.

The conditions under which the measurement is made has a considerable influence on the result. Both the temperature and humidity gradients across the sample need to be measured, controlled and recorded with the result, and the thickness of the sample should be the same. An MVTR result without specifying these conditions is almost meaningless. Certainly no two results should be compared unless the conditions are known. For example, the effect of temperature on the permeability can be as high as 10% per °C, making it possible that MVTR results achieved at 23°C and 37°C can differ by a factor of 4.

The most common international unit for the MVTR is g/m^{2}/day, or "metric perm". In the USA, g/100in^{2}/day is also in use, which is 0.064516 (approximately 1/15) of the value of g/m^{2}/day units. Typical rates in aluminium foil laminates may be as low as 0.001 g/m^{2}/day, whereas the rate in fabrics can measure up to several thousand g/m^{2}/day.

Often, barrier testing is conducted on a sheet of material. Calculations based on that can be useful when designing completed structures, clothing, and packages. Seams, creases, access points, and heat seals are critical to end-use performance. For example, the glass of a bottle may have an effective total barrier, but the screw cap closure and the closure liner might not. Performance verification and validation of complete containers, structures, or irregular objects is often recommended.

For the special case of OLEDs, where the levels of allowed permeation are in the 10^{−6} g/m^{2}/day level, the methods preferred exploit an oxidation of a metal upon the exposure to water.

== See also ==
- Adsorption
- Carbon dioxide transmission rate
- Moisture sorption isotherm
- Oxygen transmission rate
- Packaging
- Permeation
- Shelf life
- Vapor barrier
