= Oxygen transmission rate =

Oxygen transmission rate (OTR) is the measurement of the amount of oxygen gas that passes through a substance over a given period. It is mostly carried out on non-porous materials, where the mode of transport is diffusion, but there are a growing number of applications where the transmission rate also depends on flow through apertures of some description.

It relates to the permeation of oxygen through packaging to sensitive foods and pharmaceuticals.

== Measurement ==
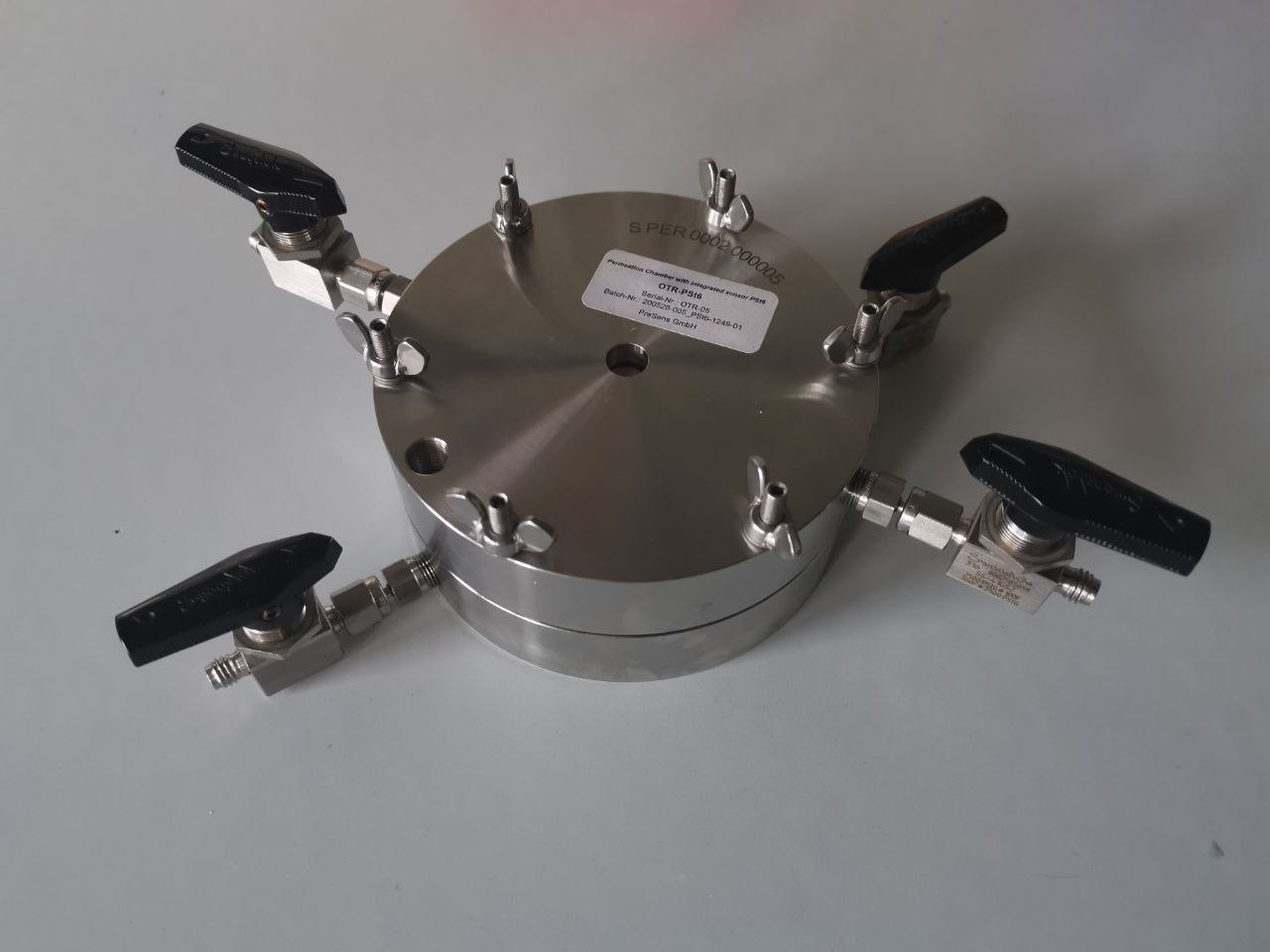
Permeation cell setup for the measurement of the oxygen transmission rate

Standard test methods are available for measuring the oxygen transmission rate of packaging materials. Completed packages, however, involve heat seals, creases, joints, and closures which often reduce the effective barrier of the package. For example, the glass of a glass bottle may have an effective total barrier but the screw cap closure and the closure liner might not.

ASTM standard test methods include:

- F3136 Standard Test Method for Oxygen Gas Transmission Rate through Plastic Film and Sheeting using a Dynamic Accumulation Method
- D3985 Standard Test Method for Oxygen Gas Transmission Rate Through Plastic Film and Sheeting Using a Coulometric Sensor
- F1307 Standard Test Method for Oxygen Transmission Rate Through Dry Packages Using a Coulometric Sensor
- F1927 Standard Test Method for Determination of Oxygen Gas Transmission Rate, Permeability and Permeance at Controlled Relative Humidity Through Barrier Materials Using a Coulometric Detector
- F2622 Standard Test Method for Oxygen Gas Transmission Rate Through Plastic Film and Sheeting Using Various Sensors

Other test methods include:

- The ambient oxygen ingress rate method (AOIR) an alternative method for measuring the oxygen transmission rates (OTR) of whole packages

== Wine ==
Also a factor of increasing awareness in the debate surrounding wine closures, natural corks show small variation in their oxygen transmission rate, which in turn translates to a degree of bottle variation.

== See also ==
- Moisture vapor transmission rate
- Permeation
- Shelf life
- Oxygen scavenger
