= SCS =

SCS may refer to:

== Education ==
=== Canada ===
- St. Clement's School, a private girls school located in Toronto
- Simcoe Composite School, a public secondary school in Norfolk County, Ontario

=== India ===
- School of Communication Studies, Panjab University, Chandigarh
- St. Columba's School, Delhi, a Catholic boys school
- St. Crispin's Senior Secondary School, in Gurgaon, Haryana

=== United States ===
- Carnegie Mellon School of Computer Science, in Pittsburgh, Pennsylvania
- Saint Christopher School, a catholic elementary school in Metairie, Louisiana
- Salisbury Christian School, a private school in Salisbury, Maryland
- Saraland City Schools, in Saraland, Alabama
- Shelburne Community School, in Shelburne, Vermont
- Shelby County Schools (disambiguation)
- Sierra Canyon School, California, United States
- Southfield Christian School, a primary and secondary private school in Southfield, Michigan
- Smithtown Christian School, in Smithtown, New York
- Stevens Cooperative School, in Hoboken and Jersey City, New Jersey
- Sumter County School District (disambiguation)

=== Other countries ===
- St. Cuthbert's Society, a college of the University of Durham
- Saba Comprehensive School, Saba, Dutch Caribbean
- St. Christopher's School, Harare, an independent, co-educational, day school in Harare, Zimbabwe
- South Crest School, a primary and secondary private school in Muntinlupa, Philippines

== Geography ==
- South China Sea
- State of Slovenes, Croats and Serbs, a political entity that existed in 1918
- St. Clair Shores, Michigan, a city in the United States
- Scatsta Airport (IATA airport code), on Mainland, Shetland Scotland
- Shopping City Süd, a shopping mall south of Vienna, Austria

== Organizations ==
- ScS, Suite Centres Sunderland, a UK retailer
- St. Catherine of Siena Parish, Wilmington, Delaware, a Catholic church
- Scottish Court Service, now Scottish Courts and Tribunals Service, a non-ministerial department of the Scottish Government
- Singapore Children's Society, a charitable organisation based in Singapore
- Society for Classical Studies, founded in 1869 as the American Philological Association
- Society of Catholic Scientists, an international organization of Catholic scientists
- Society of Christian Socialists, an American religious socialist organization
- Soil Conservation Service, the former name of the US Natural Resources Conservation Service
- Special Collection Service, a highly classified joint US Central Intelligence Agency-National Security Agency program
- Syrian Computer Society, Syria's domain name registration authority

== Technology ==
- Silicon-controlled switch, a semiconductor device
- SCS Software, a Czech video game development company
- Single-crystal silicon, a based material used in virtually all modern electronic equipment
- Self-contained system (software), a software architecture
- Sony Creative Software, an American software company
- SimCity Societies, a city-building simulation computer game
- Single Channel Simulcast, a special transmission mode, allowing the transmission of an analogue and a digital program in the same channel
- Spinal cord stimulator, an implanted medical device for chronic pain management
- Bus SCS, a domotic proprietary bus for home and building automation
- Single-byte Character Set, or SBCS, a character encoding

== Other uses ==
- State Civil Service, State-Level Administrative Services of India.
- Social Credit System, a proposed national reputation system in China
- Sea Control Ship, a small aircraft carrier
- Senior Civil Service, a salary grade in the British Civil Service
- Silvertown Tunnel cycle shuttle, a shuttle bus service in London
- Smooth clean surface, a metalworking process
- Someday Came Suddenly, the debut album by Attack Attack!
- Standard Combat Series, a wargame series from The Gamers
- Synthetic catalytic scavenger, an artificial antioxidant
- Super Coppa Sammarinese, Sammarinese football competition
- Supply chain security, in transportation and logistics
- Sweet chili sauce, a condiment
