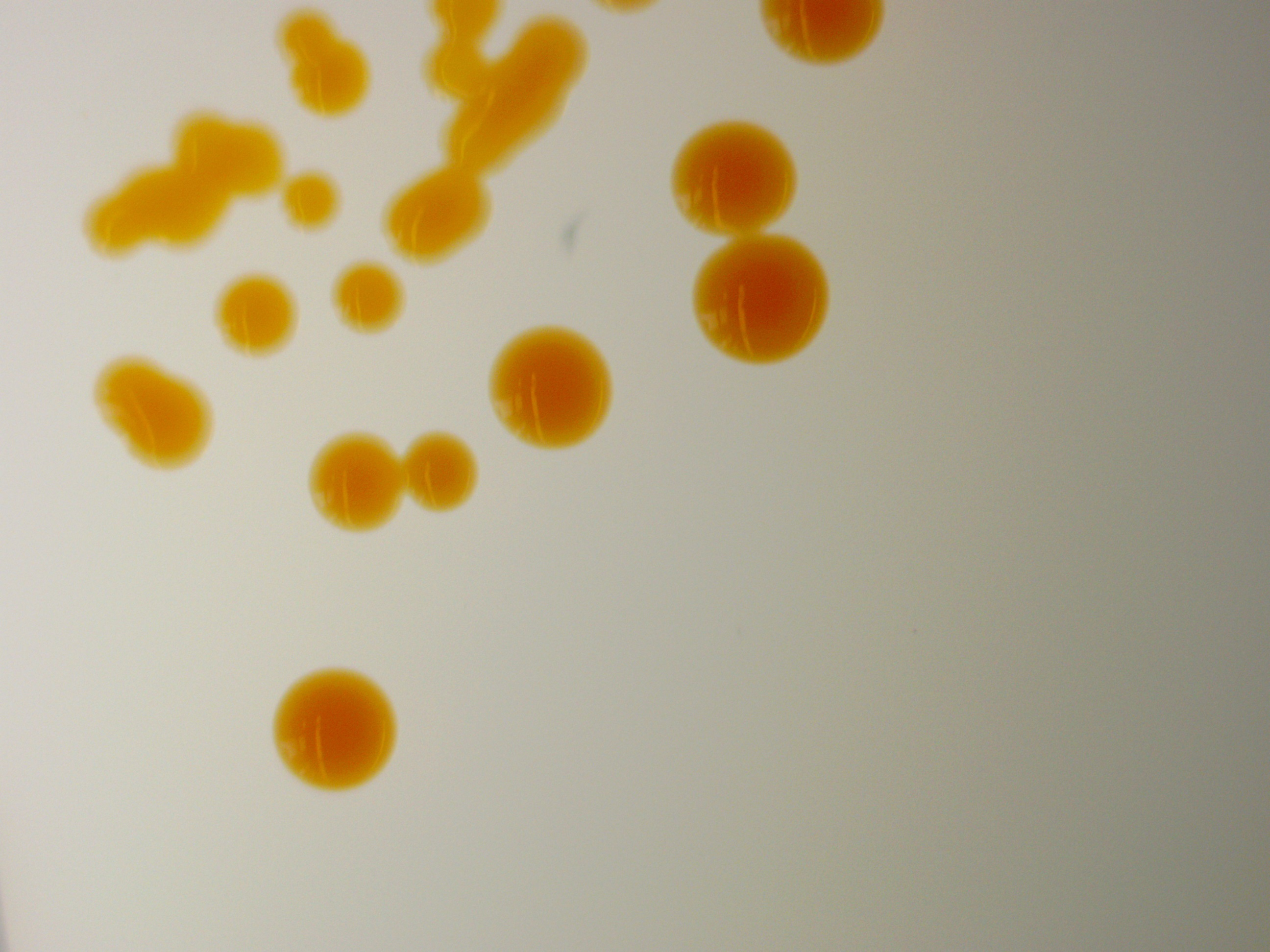

Scientific classification
- Domain: Bacteria
- Kingdom: Pseudomonadati
- Phylum: Pseudomonadota
- Class: Alphaproteobacteria
- Order: Sphingomonadales
- Family: Sphingomonadaceae
- Genus: Sphingomonas
- Species: S. aliaeris

Binomial name
- Sphingomonas aliaeris Heidler von Heilborn et al. 2021

= Sphingomonas aliaeris =

Species of bacterium

Sphingomonas aliaeris is a rod-shaped, strictly aerobic, Gram-negative, non-spore-forming, red-orange-pigmented species of bacteria, which has been isolated primarily from pork steak packed under CO_{2}-enriched modified atmosphere. Its name derives from Latin alius (for “other”) and aer (for “air” or “atmosphere”). It was identified to be a potential food spoilage organism, which is non-pathogenic to humans.

== Microbiologic characteristics ==
The species is cytochrome c oxidase-negative and catalase-positive and grows on R2A agar at temperatures of 3 to 33 °C. It shows growth under 20% CO_{2}-containing atmosphere, which - in combination with 80% O_{2} - is frequently used for packaging of red meat products. Species of this genus have not been associated with high CO_{2}-containing environments nor food matrices yet. Sphingomonas aliaeris is motile and 1.5 μm by 0.9 μm in dimension. Like other species belonging to the genus Sphingomonas, the cell membrane of Sphingomonas aliaeris contains sphingolipids. Also cardiolipin, phosphatidylcholine, phosphatidylethanolamine, mono- and dimethylphosphatidylethanolamine and phosphatidylglycerol could be detected. Another characteristic is the presence of the C_{14:0} 2-OH fatty acid and ubiquinone Q-10.

== Genetic characteristics ==
The genome was fully-sequenced and uploaded at the NCBI database. It consists of 4.26 mega base pairs. The DNA G+C content is 64.4 mol%.
