= Controlled atmosphere =

Agricultural storage method

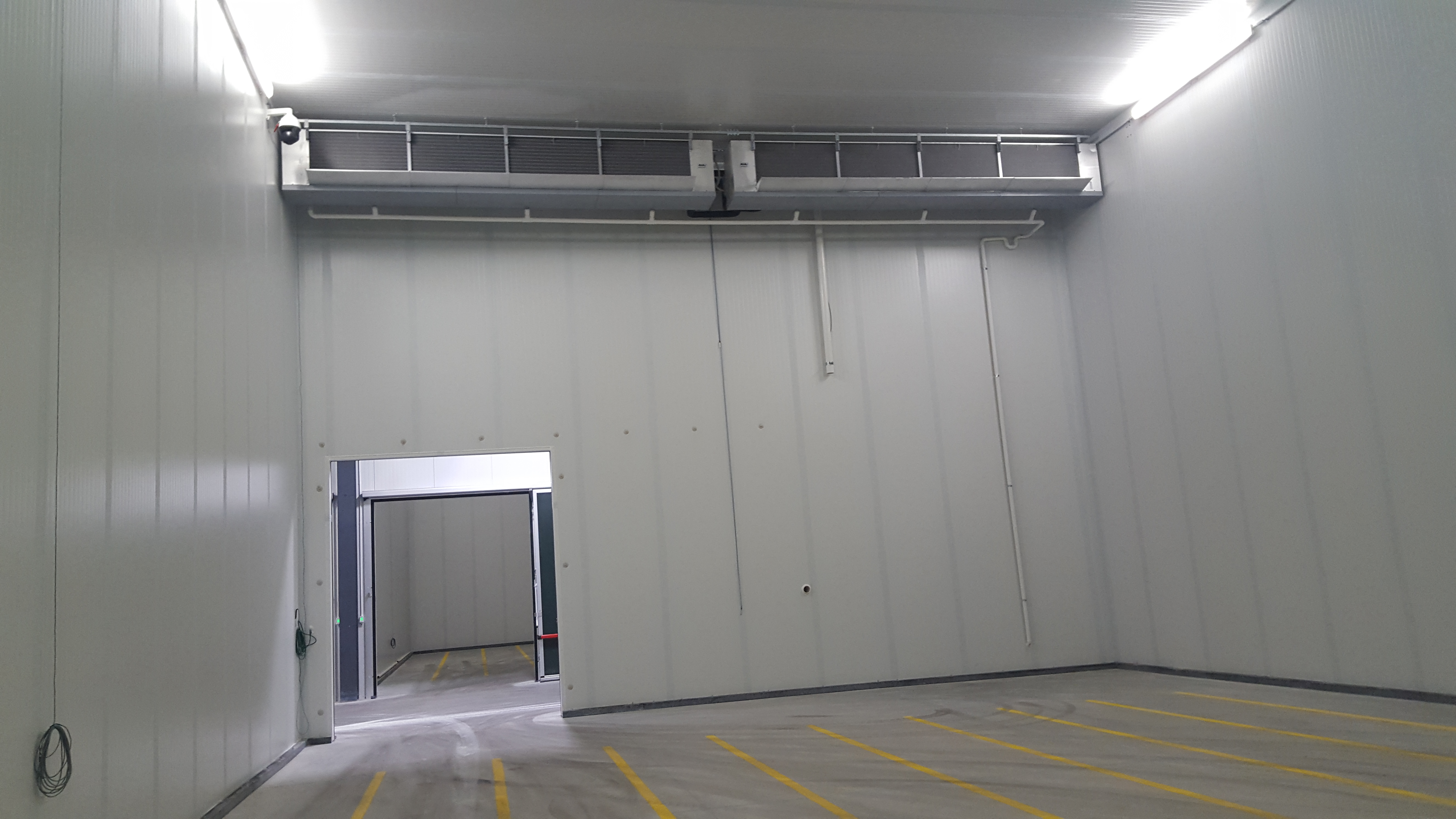
Controlled atmosphere room

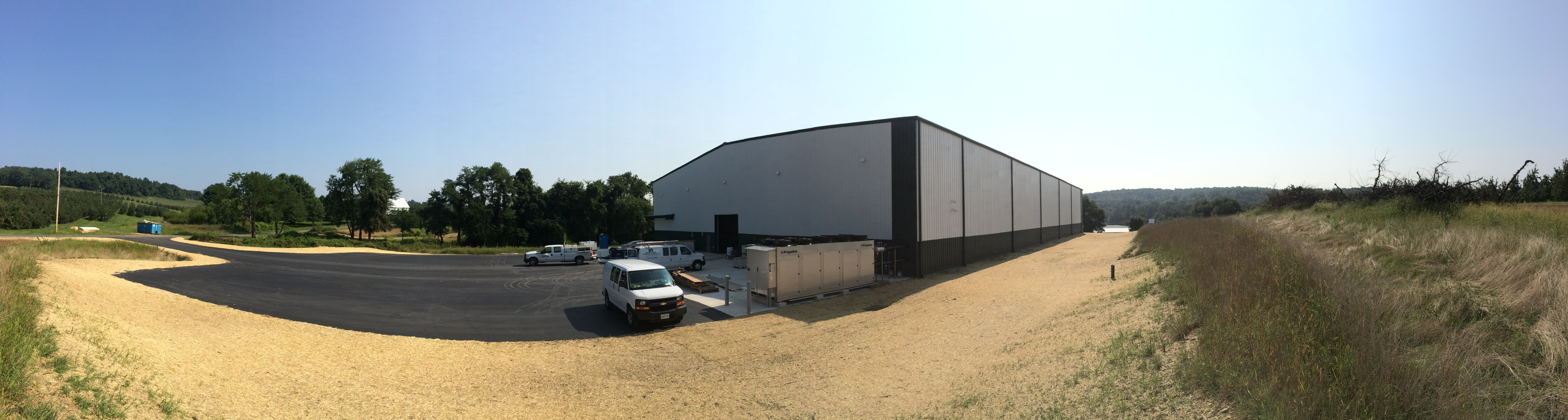
Controlled atmosphere building

A controlled atmosphere is an agricultural storage method in which the concentrations of oxygen, carbon dioxide and nitrogen, as well as the temperature and humidity of a storage room are regulated. Both dry commodities and fresh fruit and vegetables can be stored in controlled atmospheres.

== History ==
Franklin Kidd and Cyril West of Cambridge University did the basic research into fruit respiration and ripening leading to the first commercial facility in 1929.

The technique of controlled atmosphere (CA) was improved by Robert Smock, a professor at Cornell University. He visited Cambridge in the late 1930s to observe the work of Kidd and West. Smock in his research was trying to figure out how to extend the shelf life of different fruits such as apples and pears. When he returned to New York he adapted CA to work for local apple varieties, focusing on how to make McIntosh's apples last longer. In his laboratory in a barn near the university, he made different experiments by placing apples in sealed rooms at different temperatures and with various mixtures of oxygen and carbon dioxide to see how the fruit would respond. As a result of Smock's work, the first CA rooms in the U.S. were built in New York in the 1950s, causing the apple consumption season to extend to springtime nationwide. By 1960, there was capacity for 4 million bushels of apples in the US and by the 1980s, capacity exceeded 100 million bushels.

== Dry commodities ==
Grains, legumes and oilseed are stored in a controlled atmosphere primarily to control insect pests. Most insects cannot survive indefinitely without oxygen or in conditions of raised (>30%) carbon dioxide. Such controlled atmosphere treatments of grains may take several weeks at lower temperatures (<15 °C). A typical schedule for complete disinfestation of dry grain (<13% moisture content) with carbon dioxide at approximately 25 °C is a concentration above 35%(v/v) carbon dioxide in air for at least 15 days. These atmospheres can be created either by:

- Adding pure carbon dioxide or nitrogen, or the low oxygen exhausts of hydrocarbon combustion, or
- using the natural effects of respiration (by grain, molds or insects) to reduce oxygen and increase carbon dioxide (hermetic storage).

== Fruit and vegetables ==
The method is most commonly used on apples and pears, where the combination of altered atmospheric conditions and reduced temperature allow prolonged storage with only a slow loss of quality.

The long-term storage of vegetables and fruit involves inhibiting the ripening and ageing processes, thus retaining flavor and quality. Ripening is delayed by reducing the level of oxygen and increasing that of carbon dioxide and nitrogen in the cool cell so that the respiration is reduced. Normal atmosphere consists of approximately 78% nitrogen, 21% oxygen, 0.3% carbon dioxide and smaller amounts of some other gasses. In controlled atmosphere the oxygen is reduced to 1.5–2% by replacing it with nitrogen and a little bit of carbon dioxide, which is produced by fruits. Under controlled atmosphere conditions the quality and the freshness of fruit and vegetables are retained, and many products can be stored for 2 to 4 times longer than usual.

In Afghanistan, northern rural peoples preserve grapes using kangina, mud-straw containers which naturally control their internal environments to slow the drying and decay of grapes, keeping them fresh for up to 6 months.

== See also ==
- Modified atmosphere
- Modified atmosphere/modified humidity packaging
- Shelf life
