= Ōmachi =

Ōmachi may refer to:

== Places ==
- Ōmachi, Nagano (大町市), a city
- Ōmachi, Saga (大町町), a town
- Ōmachi (Kanagawa) (大町), a district in the city of Kamakura

== People with the surname ==
- Akiyoshi Ohmachi (大町 昭義; born 1958), Japanese golfer
- Shogo Omachi (大町 将梧; born 1992), Japanese footballer

== Other uses ==
- Omachi (noodles), a noodle brand from Vietnam by Masan Group, also the brand name also used for Self-heating hot pot and Self-heating rice and formerly mashed potato.
