= Scavenger (chemistry) =

Chemical additive used to remove or deactivate impurities

A scavenger in chemistry is a chemical substance added to a mixture in order to remove or de-activate impurities and unwanted reaction products, for example oxygen, to make sure that they will not cause any unfavorable reactions. Their use is wide-ranged:

- In atmospheric chemistry, the most common scavenger is the hydroxyl radical, a short-lived radical produced photolytically in the atmosphere. It is the most important oxidant for carbon monoxide, methane and other hydrocarbons, sulfur dioxide, hydrogen sulfide, and most of other contaminants, removing them from the atmosphere.
- In molecular laser isotope separation, methane is used as a scavenger gas for fluorine atoms.
- Hydrazine and ascorbic acid are used as oxygen scavenger corrosion inhibitors.
- Tocopherol and naringenin are bioactive free radical scavengers that act as antioxidants; synthetic catalytic scavengers are their synthetic counterparts
- Organotin compounds are used in polymer manufacture as hydrochloric acid scavengers.
- Oxygen scavengers or oxygen absorbers are small sachets or self adhesive labels that are placed inside modified atmosphere packs to help extend product life (notably cooked meats) and help improve product appearance. They work by absorbing any oxygen left in the pack by oxidation of the iron powder contained in the sachet/label.
- Glutathione in the body scavenges oxidizing free radicals and peroxides and as a thiol nucleophile, attacks dangerous alkylating electrophiles, which may be exogenous toxins or produced in the course of metabolism (e.g. NAPQI from paracetamol).
