= François-Étienne de La Roche =

Genevan physician, naturalist, chemist, botanist and ichthyologist

François-Étienne de La Roche (or Delaroche) (9 December 1781 – 23 December 1813) was a Genevan physician, naturalist, chemist, botanist and ichthyologist.

== Early life and family ==
He was born in Geneva to Marie Castanet and Daniel de La Roche, and was the youngest of three children. His father was an Edinburgh-trained physician, botanist, and medical translator from Geneva, who was friends with Louis Odier, the Swiss physician, medical translator and publisher. After working in Geneva, the family moved to Paris where de La Roche senior was physician to the Duke of Orléans, and later at the fr:Rue du Faubourg-Saint-Martin health centre.

== Career ==
De La Roche studied at the Faculty of Medicine at the University of Paris where, in 1806, he completed his medical thesis on the effects of strong heat on animal husbandry. He became a physician at L'Hôpital Necker.

He collected and studied fish on an expedition to the Spanish Balearic Islands between October 1807 and May 1808; he observed and described new or little-known species from that location and made a study of the swim bladders of fish.

In 1811, he carried out work on the Specific Heat of Gases in collaboration with the French physicist and chemist Jacques Étienne Bérard, work which won a prize from the Paris Academy of Science in 1812. Also in 1812, he read a paper at the Institut de France titled Dissertation on the effect that air temperature has on the phenomenon of respiration.

As an original researcher, his name is attached (as de La Roche or Delaroche) to the plant genus Alepidea and a number of different marine species. The standard author abbreviation F.Delaroche is used to indicate this person as the author when citing a botanical name.

== Death ==
De La Roche became infected with typhus bacteria and died in 1813, only just aged 32, during the same epidemic that his father also succumbed to. Both were interred in the family grave in the 25th division of Père-Lachaise Cemetery in Paris.

== Taxon described by him ==
- See Category:Taxa named by François-Étienne de La Roche
