= Modified atmosphere/modified humidity packaging =

Food preservation technology

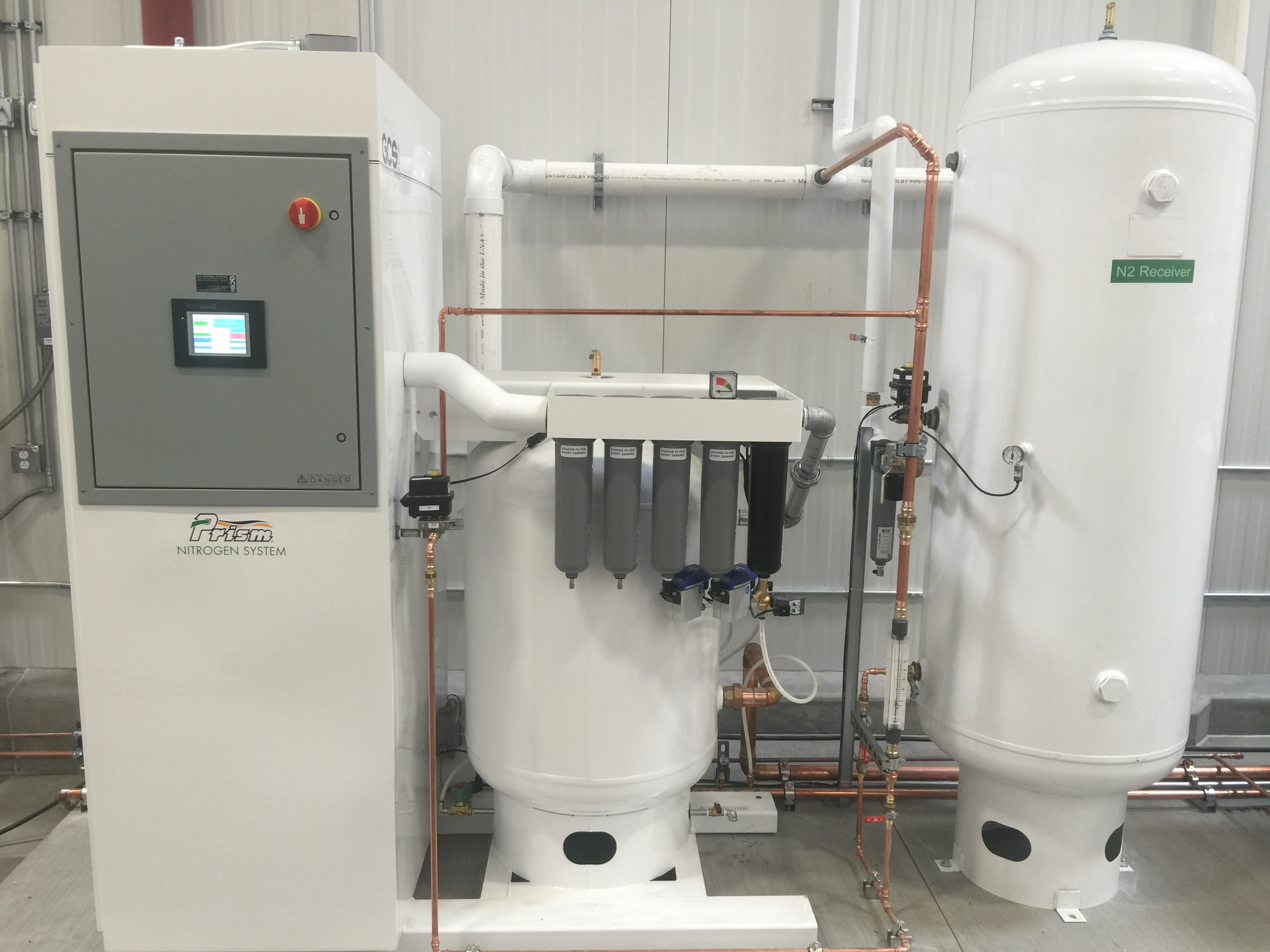
Nitrogen generator for modified atmosphere packaging

Modified atmosphere/modified humidity (MA/MH) packaging is a technology used to preserve the quality of fresh produce so that it can be sold to markets far away from where it is grown, extend the marketing period, and to help suppliers reduce food waste within the cold chain. Commercial examples of MA/MH include sea freight of Galia and cantaloupe melons from Central and South America to Europe (a 21-day journey) and North America (a 7-day journey); transport of white asparagus from fields in Peru to markets in Western Europe (a 20-day journey by land and sea); and trucking of cherries from orchards in Turkey to supermarkets in the UK (a 7-day journey).

== Scientific terms ==
EMAP
Equilibrium modified atmosphere packaging
MA/MH
Modified atmosphere/modified humidity
MAP
Modified atmosphere packaging
RH
Relative humidity
MVTR
Moisture vapor transmission rate

== History ==
Modified atmosphere/modified humidity (MA/MH) packaging is a type of equilibrium modified atmosphere packaging (EMAP), which evolved due to the need for more control of humidity in the packaging. Most of the polymers that are commercially used in EMAP are polyolefin-based, characterized by low moisture vapor transmission rate (MVTR). Temperature fluctuations during the various links in the cold logistics chain are unavoidable and will result in condensation forming on the inner surface of the package. The accumulation of condensed water in packages with low MVTR is conducive for pathological and physiological disorders. Not only does excess moisture enhance fungal and bacterial decay and the formation of off odors, it also encourages leaf sprouting in topped root vegetables, regrowth of leaves and physiological disorders such as tissue discoloration and peel blemishes. Certain produce items are more sensitive to excess moisture than others.

== Technology ==
MA/MH technology is achieved by combining proprietary blends of polymers to obtain the desired MVTR and then manipulating the oxygen (O_{2}) and carbon dioxide (CO_{2}) transmission rates of the polymer by laser and/or mechanical microperforations. The result is a film which is tailored to provide the optimum modified atmosphere and modified humidity for the produce to be packaged. "Film composition and extent of microperforation are tailored in accordance with the respiratory activity and weight of the produce packaged, anticipated temperature fluctuations during storage and shipment, and expected physiological and pathological responses of the produce to CO_{2}/O_{2} concentrations and humidity levels inside the package. ... [MA/MH] packaging allow[s] the formation of a desirable modified atmosphere, retarding ripening and senescence of the produce. Additional beneficial effects ... include reduction of decay, chilling injury, leaf elongation, leaf sprouting, tissue discoloration, peel blemishes, and formation of off-odors, and inhibition of bacterial growth on the produce surface."

== Benefits to fresh produce ==
Modifying the atmosphere inside fresh produce packaging to provide lowered levels of O_{2} and elevated levels of CO_{2} is beneficial for many fresh produce items and "can reduce respiration, decrease ethylene production and action, retard tissue ripening and softening, retard chlorophyll degradation and biosynthesis of carotenoids and anthocyanins, reduce enzymatic browning, alleviate physiological disorders and chilling injury, retard development of decay, and maintain nutritional quality of produce. The effect of decreased O_{2} and increased CO_{2} on senescence and ripening process are additive and can be synergistic."

"In vegetative tissues MAP can also reduce leaf regrowth (green onion and leek), stem toughening (asparagus), and leaf sprouting and rooting in root vegetables (parsnip, radishes). The delay of ripening and senescence of fruits and vegetables also reduces their susceptibility to pathogens."

== The importance of tightly controlled relative humidity ==
Maintaining high relative humidity (RH) in modified atmosphere packaging is important because it "results in reduced transpiration of water from the produce, thereby reducing wilting, shriveling, and loss of firmness. The accumulation of vapor in the packaging depends on the rate of water loss from the product, its surface area, the water vapor transmission rate (WVTR) of the film, and the external environment temperature."

"The RH in most sealed packaging is near the saturation level. Therefore, even very small fluctuations in temperature during storage or shipment may result in water condensation on the surface of both film and produce. Condensed water on the produce surface may adversely affect the gas exchange, leading to an unfavorable internal atmosphere." Even more detrimental may be the enhancement of produce decay, and physiological processes such as regrowth. In addition, certain human pathogens may proliferate when in-pack atmosphere contains high humidity and low O_{2}.

== Hazards associated with MAP ==
Successful delivery of fresh produce in MAP is not without potential hazards due to incompatibility of MAP film to the fruit or vegetable it is intended to keep fresh and high dependence on good temperature management. Undesirable consequences of incompatible film and/or high temperatures may be "anaerobic respiration with the accumulation of acetaldehyde, ethanol, ethyl acetate, and lactic acid, all of fermentation, contributing to the development of off odors, off flavors, and disuse deterioration."

Extreme changes in O_{2} and CO_{2} to intolerable levels often occur when fresh produce packed in improper MAP is exposed to higher than recommended temperatures during shipment and distribution. Other undesirable effects of improper MAP are initiation or aggravation of certain physiological disorders, irregular fruit ripening, and increased susceptibility to decay following physiological damage."

== Products ==
Several types of products, including retail bags, carton liners, bin bags, lidding films and flow pack have been developed from MA/MH films and are commercially available. Each product type is uniquely engineered for the specific produce type (and in some cases, the produce variety) to be packaged. This is done through a rigorous process of developing, testing, adjusting and retesting each MA\MH product both in the lab and in commercial trials.

This meticulous process is repeated for each combination of produce and packaging type because of the many factors involved in developing a successful MA/MH packaging. These factors are "storage and shipment temperature, product respiration rate and quotient, response to levels of CO_{2}, O_{2} and humidity, and product weight. Hence, film packaging that is adequate for consumer packages is not always suitable for bulk packaging and vice versa."

== See also ==
- Active packaging
- Oxygen absorber
- Shelf life
- Permeation
- Cold chain
