= Active packaging =

Packaging that interacts with products or their environment

Active packaging refers to packaging systems designed to perform functions beyond passive containment and physical protection. Active materials deliberately absorb or release substances in order to extend shelf life or maintain or improve the condition of a packaged product. Intelligent packaging monitors the condition of the product, the atmosphere inside the package, or conditions encountered during storage and distribution.

The terms active packaging, intelligent packaging, and smart packaging are related and can overlap. Smart packaging is commonly used as a broader term for systems that detect, record, communicate, or respond to changes affecting a packaged product.

Active and intelligent systems are used with food, pharmaceuticals, medical products, electronics, industrial components, agricultural products, and other goods that are sensitive to oxygen, moisture, microorganisms, temperature, light, physical damage, or tampering.

== Scope and terminology ==
Traditional packaging protects a product through physical barriers, structural strength, closures, and containment. Passive barrier materials may reduce the movement of oxygen, water vapour, light, aromas, or contaminants without actively changing the internal package environment.

A package is normally classified as active when it contains a component designed to absorb, release, or otherwise interact with a substance in the product or package atmosphere. Examples include oxygen scavengers, moisture absorbers, antimicrobial agents, ethylene scavengers, and carbon-dioxide emitters.

Vacuum-sealed pouches and low-permeability multilayer films are not automatically active packaging. They remain passive systems unless they are combined with an intentionally reactive or releasing component. Intelligent systems differ from active systems because their main function is to sense, record, display, or communicate information.

== Active functions ==
=== Moisture control ===
Desiccants are hygroscopic materials used to reduce water vapour inside sealed packages. They are commonly supplied as sachets, canisters, tablets, closures, labels, or components incorporated into packaging materials.

Moisture-control systems are used with foods, pharmaceuticals, electronics, machinery, diagnostic products, and other moisture-sensitive goods. Their performance depends on the initial moisture level, internal package volume, storage humidity, temperature, package permeability, and absorption capacity of the desiccant.

Some pharmaceutical containers incorporate desiccants into bottle closures or internal structures. This reduces the risk of consumers accidentally removing or mishandling a loose sachet.

=== Corrosion control ===
Packaging for metal products can contain volatile corrosion inhibitors, also known as vapour-phase corrosion inhibitors. These compounds evaporate within an enclosed package and form a protective molecular layer on exposed metal surfaces.

Volatile corrosion inhibitors may be incorporated into paper, polymer films, foams, oils, emitters, chips, and other packaging materials. Their effectiveness depends on inhibitor concentration, package sealing, storage conditions, metal type, and the volume of the enclosed space.

Corrosion-control packaging is used for machinery, automotive parts, tools, electronic components, military equipment, and metal products stored or transported in humid environments.

=== Metal chelation and antioxidant systems ===
Trace transition metals, particularly iron and copper, can accelerate oxidative reactions in foods and other sensitive products. Metal-chelating packaging contains compounds that bind these metals and reduce their ability to promote oxidation.

Chelating compounds may be immobilised on a polymer surface so that they interact with the product without being directly mixed into it. This approach has been studied as a method for improving oxidative stability and reducing dependence on directly added preservatives.

Antioxidants can also be incorporated into films, coatings, labels, or sachets. The active compound may remain immobilised on the package surface or be designed to migrate within regulated limits.

=== Oxygen and atmosphere control ===
Oxygen scavengers, also called oxygen absorbers, remove residual oxygen from a sealed package. Reducing oxygen can slow lipid oxidation, colour changes, vitamin degradation, mould growth, and the growth of aerobic spoilage organisms.

Iron-based oxygen absorbers commonly contain iron powder and supporting ingredients that allow oxidation to occur. Other systems use ascorbic acid, enzymes, unsaturated organic compounds, microorganisms, antioxidants, or oxygen-scavenging polymers.

The active material may be supplied in a sachet, card, label, bottle closure, tray, film, liner, or moulded package component. Sachets must be clearly identified and protected against accidental opening or ingestion.

In practical dry-food storage, oxygen-absorber sachets may be placed inside suitable high-barrier Mylar pouches before heat sealing. The food type, moisture level, absorber capacity, seal integrity, and package barrier must be appropriate for reduced-oxygen storage.

The effectiveness of an oxygen scavenger is partly determined by the package's oxygen transmission rate. A low-transmission barrier limits the amount of oxygen entering after the initial oxygen has been removed. A high-barrier film remains passive packaging when used without an active component.

Modified atmosphere packaging changes the concentration of gases surrounding a product. Nitrogen, carbon dioxide, oxygen, or mixtures of these gases may be selected according to the product and its spoilage mechanisms.

Active components such as oxygen scavengers, carbon-dioxide emitters, carbon-dioxide absorbers, and ethanol emitters can help establish or maintain a desired package atmosphere.

Reduced-oxygen packaging requires product-specific safety controls. A low-oxygen environment may inhibit aerobic spoilage organisms while allowing some anaerobic microorganisms to grow. Product acidity, water activity, processing, refrigeration, storage time, and package integrity must be considered together.

=== Ethylene control ===
Fruits and vegetables naturally release ethylene, a plant hormone involved in ripening, ageing, and other physiological processes. Packaging systems that remove ethylene or inhibit its action can delay unwanted ripening during storage and transportation.

Potassium permanganate immobilised on alumina, silica, or another carrier is one of the established ethylene-scavenging systems. Activated carbon, zeolites, catalytic materials, and other adsorbents have also been studied.

1-Methylcyclopropene does not remove ethylene from the package. It limits ethylene activity by binding to receptors in plant tissue.

The effectiveness of an ethylene-control system depends on the produce type, maturity, respiration rate, storage temperature, ventilation, humidity, and scavenger capacity.

=== Antimicrobial packaging ===
Antimicrobial packaging is designed to inhibit pathogenic or spoilage microorganisms on a product surface or within the package environment.

Antimicrobial compounds may be incorporated into films and coatings, immobilised on a package surface, released into the package headspace, or contained in pads, labels, and separate emitters. Studied agents include organic acids, plant-derived compounds, enzymes, bacteriocins, metal ions, nanoparticles, and synthetic antimicrobial substances.

The performance of antimicrobial packaging depends on the target microorganism, active-agent concentration, release rate, temperature, food composition, storage period, and contact between the package and the product.

Absorbent pads used with meat, poultry, seafood, and fresh produce can combine liquid absorption with antimicrobial substances or freshness indicators.

== Intelligent monitoring and communication ==
Intelligent packaging monitors a product, package atmosphere, or distribution environment. The system may provide information visually, store it electronically, communicate it to another device, or trigger an active response.

=== Time and temperature indicators ===
Temperature indicators show that a specified temperature has been reached or exceeded. Time–temperature indicators respond to cumulative exposure over time and can provide an indication of the thermal history of a product.

Indicators may use chemical, enzymatic, microbial, mechanical, electronic, or colour-changing mechanisms. They are used with foods, vaccines, pharmaceuticals, biological materials, and other temperature-sensitive goods.

Electronic temperature data loggers can record the time, duration, and extent of temperature deviations. Thermochromic inks provide reversible or irreversible colour changes when particular temperatures are reached.

=== Freshness and gas indicators ===
Freshness indicators respond to chemical or biological changes associated with product deterioration. They may react to pH changes, volatile amines, carbon dioxide, oxygen, hydrogen sulphide, humidity, or microbial metabolites.

Gas indicators can show leakage, loss of the intended package atmosphere, or the presence or absence of a target gas. Biosensors combine a biological recognition element with a transducer that converts a reaction into a measurable signal.

Freshness indicators do not replace microbiological testing or required date labelling. The indicator must be designed for the specific product, spoilage pathway, and storage environment.

=== Radio-frequency identification and smart labels ===
Radio-frequency identification tags use radio waves to identify and track products, packages, pallets, and unit loads. Passive tags receive power from a reader, while active tags contain their own power source.

RFID tags may be combined with temperature, humidity, shock, or other sensors. They can support inventory control, authentication, cold-chain monitoring, and supply-chain traceability.

Near-field communication tags allow compatible smartphones and other devices to retrieve product information or interact with digital services.

=== Barcodes and digital links ===
Linear barcodes and two-dimensional symbols are used to identify packaged products and communicate data. QR codes can connect users to instructions, ingredient information, traceability records, authentication services, recall notices, and accessibility resources.

The GS1 Digital Link standard defines how GS1 identifiers can be represented in web addresses and connected to online information and services.

A printed barcode or QR code alone does not make a package active. It may be considered an intelligent or connected-packaging feature when it provides access to relevant data, uniquely identifies an item, records interactions, or operates with sensors and information systems.

Digital identifiers can be copied unless they are combined with authentication, encryption, secure graphics, serialisation, or server-side verification.

=== Security and authentication ===
Security packaging can include tamper-evident closures, security printing, holograms, digital watermarks, RFID tags, unique serial numbers, covert markers, and forensic authentication features.

These systems help identify counterfeiting, diversion, unauthorised opening, product substitution, and manipulation of the package.

Authentication systems may combine visible, covert, forensic, and digital elements. Scan data from serialised codes can also help identify unusual copying or distribution patterns.

=== Shock, tilt, and vibration monitoring ===
Shock indicators, tilt indicators, and vibration monitors can be attached to products, packages, pallets, or shipping containers. They show or record when handling conditions exceed a selected limit.

Digital data loggers can record the magnitude, direction, duration, and timing of shocks and vibrations. The collected information may support product inspection, carrier evaluation, damage investigation, and laboratory package testing.

These systems are used with medical equipment, calibrated instruments, electronics, artworks, industrial components, and other sensitive goods.

== Temperature control and product preparation ==
Insulated shipping containers, reflective barriers, gel packs, and phase-change materials manage temperature without generating heat or cooling. These are generally classified as passive thermal packaging.

Some packages contain separate compartments that create an exothermic or endothermic reaction. These systems can heat or cool a product without an external appliance. Self-heating food packaging is used for some beverages, meals, and field rations.

Microwave packages may contain susceptor materials that absorb microwave energy and convert it into heat. Susceptors can improve surface browning or crisping. Other microwave designs regulate steam release, pressure, or heating distribution.

Some dispensing packages meter, mix, foam, spray, or activate their contents during use. Examples include dual-component adhesive cartridges, inhalers, spray containers, and packages that combine ingredients immediately before dispensing.

Lubricant-impregnated and low-surface-energy coatings have also been studied as methods of improving the emptying of viscous products from containers.

== Materials and system design ==
Active and intelligent components can be incorporated into:

- Sachets, canisters, pads, cards, and emitters
- Labels and printed indicators
- Bottle caps and closures
- Polymer films and multilayer laminates
- Paper, board, plastic, glass, and metal coatings
- Trays and moulded package components
- Adhesives and absorbent structures
- Electronic tags, sensors, and data loggers

The active component may be positioned inside a package without directly touching the product. It may also be immobilised on a food-contact surface or incorporated into the packaging material.

System design must consider the quantity of active material, release or absorption rate, package volume, barrier performance, product composition, storage temperature, expected shelf life, migration limits, consumer safety, manufacturing conditions, recycling, and disposal.

Edible films, bio-based polymers, biodegradable materials, nanoparticles, natural antimicrobials, and responsive colour indicators are continuing areas of research.

Silver nanoparticles and other antimicrobial nanomaterials have been studied for packaging applications, but their migration, toxicity, regulatory status, recycling impact, and environmental effects require evaluation.

== Applications ==
Food-packaging applications include oxygen removal, moisture control, ethylene scavenging, antimicrobial activity, modified-atmosphere maintenance, freshness indication, and temperature monitoring.

Pharmaceutical and medical applications include moisture-control closures, oxygen absorbers, temperature indicators, authentication features, adherence monitoring, and track-and-trace systems.

Industrial applications include corrosion-inhibiting packaging for machinery, electronics, tools, automotive components, and military equipment. Shock and vibration monitoring is used with calibrated or fragile products.

Agricultural applications include ethylene-control materials, humidity management, antimicrobial pads, freshness indicators, and controlled-release substances used during produce storage and distribution.

Active packaging can also be used in transport systems for biological materials and organs, although these applications require specialised temperature control, sterility, and regulatory oversight.

== Safety and regulation ==
Active packaging is designed to interact with the packaged product or the surrounding environment. The active function does not remove the requirement for the underlying packaging to comply with applicable food-contact, pharmaceutical, transport, environmental, and product-safety rules.

In the European Union, Commission Regulation (EC) No 450/2009 establishes specific requirements for active and intelligent materials intended to come into contact with food. It defines active materials as materials designed to deliberately release or absorb substances in order to extend shelf life or maintain or improve food condition.

Substances intended to migrate into food may also be subject to food-additive and labelling requirements. Components positioned behind a functional barrier must remain within applicable migration limits.

Intelligent packaging must not provide misleading information about the condition or safety of a product. An indicator that makes spoiled food appear acceptable could create a safety risk.

Safety assessment may include:

- Toxicological evaluation of active substances
- Overall and specific migration testing
- Assessment of reaction products and impurities
- Evaluation of intended and foreseeable use
- Control of microbial hazards
- Labelling of non-edible components
- Protection against accidental ingestion
- Stability during manufacturing, transport, and storage
- Disposal, recycling, and environmental considerations

Reduced-oxygen and antimicrobial systems must not replace required hygiene, processing, refrigeration, shelf-life controls, or microbiological testing.

== See also ==
- Automatic identification and data capture
- Desiccant
- Electronic article surveillance
- Food contact materials
- Modified atmosphere
- Oxygen scavenger
- Oxygen transmission rate
- Scavenger (chemistry)
- Security printing
- Self-heating food packaging
- Smart label
- Smart material
- Time–temperature indicator
