= Jacques Étienne Bérard =

French naturalist, chemist and physicist

Jacques Etienne Bérard (12 October 1789 – 10 June 1869) was a French naturalist, chemist and physicist.

== Early life and family ==
He was born in Montpellier to Thérèse Salettes and Étienne Bérard, the latter a scientist and chemical manufacturer (particularly of sulphuric acid). Bérard senior worked with Jean-Antoine Chaptal, Count of Chanteloup, who was a chemist, industrialist, politician and an acquaintance of another French chemist, Claude Louis Berthollet. Through this connection, his son was recommended as Berthollet's laboratory assistant.

He married Madeleine Anaïs Combres in 1829. They had three children, Stéphanie Françoise Amica, Henri Étienne and Raoul.

== Career ==
As an assistant from 1807, Bérard became a member of the Société d'Arcueil, a group of like-minds who met regularly at the homes of Berthollet at Arcueil, near Paris; he was able to frequent with many experienced and well-known scientists. His first published scientific work was in analysing salts and solubilities. He completed bachelor of arts and bachelor of science degrees at the University of Paris in 1811. The same year, his experiments with François-Étienne de La Roche won the prize of the First Class of the University, for determining the specific heat of gases using a copper calorimeter. He worked with Étienne-Louis Malus on polarization (of infrared and ultraviolet), which Malus later became famous for. He provided the density of nitric oxide which Joseph Louis Gay-Lussac used as a datum for his law of combining volumes He departed for l'École Supérieure de Pharmacie de Montpellier in 1813.

He was elected to l'Académie des Sciences of France in the chemistry section on 20 December 1819. The Académie des Sciences awarded him a prize for his pioneering study of the ripening of fruit in 1821, after he tested different atmospheres on harvested fruits. Understanding that fruits ripen in an atmosphere with oxygen, and release carbon dioxide, he suggested sealing fruits in jars with an oxygen absorber. He became professor of mineral chemistry at l'École Supérieure de Pharmacie in Montpellier in 1827. In the same city, he also became Dean of the Faculty of Medicine at l'Académie des Sciences et Lettres, a position he held from 1847 to 1869. He researched many topics, including lime used in winemaking and chemicals in mineral water.

Bérard was the first professor of toxicology at Montpellier. He was a pioneer in chemical engineering, including pharmaceuticals, and was managing director of La Paille, the manufacturing site that had been founded by Chaptal in 1782.

== See also ==
- Modified atmosphere

== Publications ==
- J. E. Bérard: Observations on the Alkaline Oxalates and Superoxalates, and particularly on the Proportions of their Elements. Paris 1812. Journal of the Nature and Philosophy of Chemistry and the Arts, volume 31, page 20.
- J. E. Bérard, François De La Roche: Mémoire sur la détermination de la chaleur spécifique des différents gaz. Paris, Perronneau 1813
- F. E. Delaroche, J. E. Bérard: Mémoire sur la détermination de la chaleur spécifique des différens gaz. H. Perronneau, Paris 1813
