= Modified atmosphere =

Packaging practice

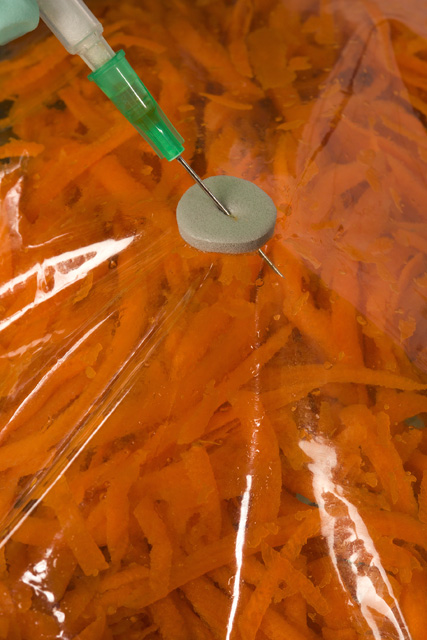
Testing the atmosphere in a plastic bag of carrots

Modified atmosphere packaging (MAP) is the practice of modifying the composition of the internal atmosphere of a package (commonly food packages, drugs, etc.) in order to improve the shelf life. The need for this technology for food arises from the short shelf life of food products such as meat, fish, poultry, and dairy in the presence of oxygen. In food, oxygen is readily available for lipid oxidation reactions. Oxygen also helps maintain high respiration rates of fresh produce, which contribute to shortened shelf life. From a microbiological aspect, oxygen encourages the growth of aerobic spoilage microorganisms. Therefore, the reduction of oxygen and its replacement with other gases can reduce or delay oxidation reactions and microbiological spoilage. Oxygen scavengers may also be used to reduce browning due to lipid oxidation by halting the auto-oxidative chemical process. MAP achieves changes in the gaseous atmosphere by incorporating different compositions of gases.

The modification process generally lowers the amount of oxygen (O_{2}) in the headspace of the package. Oxygen can be replaced with nitrogen (N_{2}), a comparatively inert gas, or carbon dioxide (CO_{2}).

A stable atmosphere of gases inside the packaging can be achieved using active techniques, such as gas flushing and compensated vacuum, or passively by designing "breathable" films.

== History ==
The first recorded beneficial effects of using modified atmosphere date back to 1821. Jacques Étienne Bérard, a professor at the School of Pharmacy in Montpellier, France, reported delayed ripening of fruit and increased shelf life in low-oxygen storage conditions. Controlled atmosphere storage (CAS) was used from the 1930s when ships transporting fresh apples and pears had high levels of CO_{2} in their holding rooms in order to increase the shelf life of the product. In the 1970s MA packages reached the stores when bacon and fish were sold in retail packs in Mexico. Since then development has been continuous and interest in MAP has grown due to consumer demand.

== Theory ==
Atmosphere within the package can be modified passively or actively. In passive MAP, the high concentration of CO_{2} and low O_{2} levels in the package is achieved over time as a result of respiration of the product and gas transmission rates of the packaging film. This method is commonly used for fresh respiring fruits and vegetables. Reducing O_{2} and increasing CO_{2} slows down respiration rate, conserves stored energy, and therefore extended shelf life. On the other hand, active MA involves the use of active systems such as O_{2} and CO_{2} scavengers or emitters, moisture absorbers, ethylene scavengers, ethanol emitters and gas flushing in the packaging film or container to modify the atmosphere within the package.

The mixture of gases selected for a MA package depends on the type of product, the packaging materials and the storage temperature. The atmosphere in an MA package consists mainly of adjusted amounts of N_{2}, O_{2}, and CO_{2.} Reduction of O_{2} promotes delay in deteriorative reactions in foods such as lipid oxidation, browning reactions and growth of spoilage organisms. Low O_{2} levels of 3-5% are used to slow down respiration rate in fruits and vegetables. In the case of red meat, however, high levels of O_{2} (~80%) are used to increase the formation of oxymyoglobin and maintain an attractive bright red color of the meat. Meat color enhancement is not required for pork, poultry and cooked meats; therefore, a higher concentration of CO_{2} is used to extend the shelf life. Levels higher than 10% of CO_{2} are phytotoxic for fruit and vegetables, so CO_{2} is maintained below this level.

N_{2} is mostly used as a filler gas to prevent pack collapse. In addition, it is also used to prevent oxidative rancidity in packaged products such as snack foods by displacing atmospheric air, especially oxygen, therefore extending shelf life. The use of noble gases such as helium (He), argon (Ar) and xenon (Xe) to replace N_{2} as the balancing gas in MAP can also be used to preserve and extend the shelf life of fresh and minimally processed fruits and vegetables. Their beneficial effects are due to their higher solubility and diffusivity in water, making them more effective in displacing O_{2} from cellular sites and enzymatic O_{2} receptors.

There has been a debate regarding the use of carbon monoxide (CO) in the packaging of red meat due to its possible toxic effect on packaging workers. Its use results in a more stable red color of carboxymyoglobin in meat, which leads to another concern that it can mask evidence of spoilage in the product.

== Effect on microorganisms ==
Low O_{2} and high CO_{2} concentrations in packages are effective in limiting the growth of Gram negative bacteria, molds and aerobic microorganisms, such as Pseudomonas spp. High O_{2} combined with high CO_{2} could have bacteriostatic and bactericidal effects by suppression of aerobes by high CO_{2} and anaerobes by high O_{2}. CO_{2} has the ability to penetrate bacterial membrane and affect intracellular pH. Therefore, lag phase and generation time of spoilage microorganisms are increased resulting in shelf life extension of refrigerated foods. Since the growth of spoilage microorganisms are suppressed by MAP, the ability of the pathogens to grow is potentially increased. Microorganisms that can survive under low oxygen environment such as Campylobacter jejuni, Clostridium botulinum, E. coli, Salmonella, Listeria and Aeromonas hydrophila are of major concern for MA packaged products. Products may appear organoleptically acceptable due to the delayed growth of the spoilage microorganisms but might contain harmful pathogens. This risk can be minimized by use of additional hurdles such as temperature control (maintain temperature below 3 degrees C), lowering water activity (less than 0.92), reducing pH (below 4.5) or addition of preservatives such as nitrite to delay metabolic activity and growth of pathogens.

== Packaging materials ==
Flexible films are commonly used for products such as fresh produce, meats, fish and bread seeing as they provide suitable permeability for gases and water vapor to reach the desired atmosphere. Pre-formed trays are formed and sent to the food packaging facility where they are filled. The package headspace then undergoes modification and sealing. Pre-formed trays are usually more flexible and allow for a broader range of sizes as opposed to thermoformed packaging materials as different tray sizes and colors can be handled without the risk of damaging the package. Thermoformed packaging however is received in the food packaging facility as a roll of sheets. Each sheet is subjected to heat and pressure, and is formed at the packaging station. Following the forming, the package is filled with the product, and then sealed. The advantages that thermoformed packaging materials have over pre-formed trays are mainly cost-related: thermoformed packaging uses 30% to 50% less material, and they are transported as rolls of material. This will amount in significant reduction of manufacturing and transportation costs.

When selecting packaging films for MAP of fruits and vegetables the main characteristics to consider are gas permeability, water vapor transmission rate, mechanical properties, transparency, type of package and sealing reliability. Traditionally used packaging films like LDPE (low-density polyethylene), PVC (polyvinyl chloride), EVA (ethylene-vinyl acetate) and OPP (oriented polypropylene) are not permeable enough for highly respiring products like fresh-cut produce, mushrooms and broccoli. As fruits and vegetables are respiring products, there is a need to transmit gases through the film. Films designed with these properties are called permeable films. Other films, called barrier films, are designed to prevent the exchange of gases and are mainly used with non-respiring products like meat and fish.

MAP films developed to control the humidity level as well as the gas composition in the sealed package are beneficial for the prolonged storage of fresh fruits, vegetables and herbs that are sensitive to moisture. These films are commonly referred to as modified atmosphere/modified humidity packaging (MA/MH) films.

== Equipment ==
In using form-fill-seal packaging machines, the main function is to place the product in a flexible pouch suitable for the desired characteristics of the final product. These pouches can either be pre-formed or thermoformed. The food is introduced into the pouch, the composition of the headspace atmosphere is changed within the package; it is then heat sealed. These types of machines are typically called pillow-wrap, which horizontally or vertically form, fill and seal the product. Form-fill-seal packaging machines are usually used for large scale operations.

In contrast, chamber machines are used for batch processes. A filled pre-formed wrap is filled with the product and introduced into a cavity. The cavity is closed and vacuum is then pulled on the chamber and the modified atmosphere is inserted as desired. Sealing of the package is done through heated sealing bars, and the product is then removed. This batch process is labor-intensive and thus requires a longer period of time; however, it is relatively cheaper than packaging machines which are automated.

Additionally, snorkel machines are used to modify the atmosphere within a package after the food has been filled. The product is placed in the packaging material and positioned into the machine without the need of a chamber. A nozzle, which is the snorkel, is then inserted into the packaging material. It pulls a vacuum and then flushes the modified atmosphere into the package. The nozzle is removed and the package is heat sealed. This method is suitable for bulk and large operations.

== Products ==
Many products such as red meat, seafood, minimally processed fruits and vegetables, salads, pasta, cheese, bakery goods, poultry, cooked and cured meats, ready meals and dried foods are packaged under MA. A summary of optimal gas mixtures for MA products is shown in the following table.

Modified atmosphere packaging for different food products and optimal gas mixtures

Product	Oxygen (%)	Carbon dioxide (%)	Nitrogen (%)
Red meat	80–85	15	-
Poultry	-	25	75
Fish	-	60	40
Cheeses	-	100	-
Bread	-	70	30
Fresh pasta	-	-	100
Fruits and vegetables	3–5	3–5	85–95

=== Grains ===
Modified atmosphere may be used to store grains.

CO_{2} prevents insects and, depending on concentration, mold and oxidation from damaging the grain. Grain stored in this way can remain edible for approximately five years. One method is placing a block of dry ice in the bottom and filling the can with the grain. Another method is purging the container from the bottom by gaseous carbon dioxide from a cylinder or bulk supply vessel.

Nitrogen gas (N_{2}) at concentrations of 98% or higher is also used effectively to kill insects in the grain through hypoxia. However, carbon dioxide has an advantage in this respect, as it kills organisms through hypercarbia and hypoxia (depending on concentration), but it requires concentrations of roughly over 35%. This makes carbon dioxide preferable for fumigation in situations where a hermetic seal cannot be maintained.

Air-tight storage of grains (sometimes called hermetic storage) relies on the respiration of grain, insects, and fungi that can modify the enclosed atmosphere sufficiently to control insect pests. This is a method of great antiquity, as well as having modern equivalents. The success of the method relies on having the correct mix of sealing, grain moisture, and temperature.

A patented process uses fuel cells to exhaust and automatically maintain the exhaustion of oxygen in a shipping container, containing, for example, fresh fish.

== See also ==
- Active packaging
- Cold chain
- Modified atmosphere/modified humidity packaging
- Permeation
- Shelf life
- Food packaging
