= Kangina =

Afghan mud-straw containers for preserving grapes

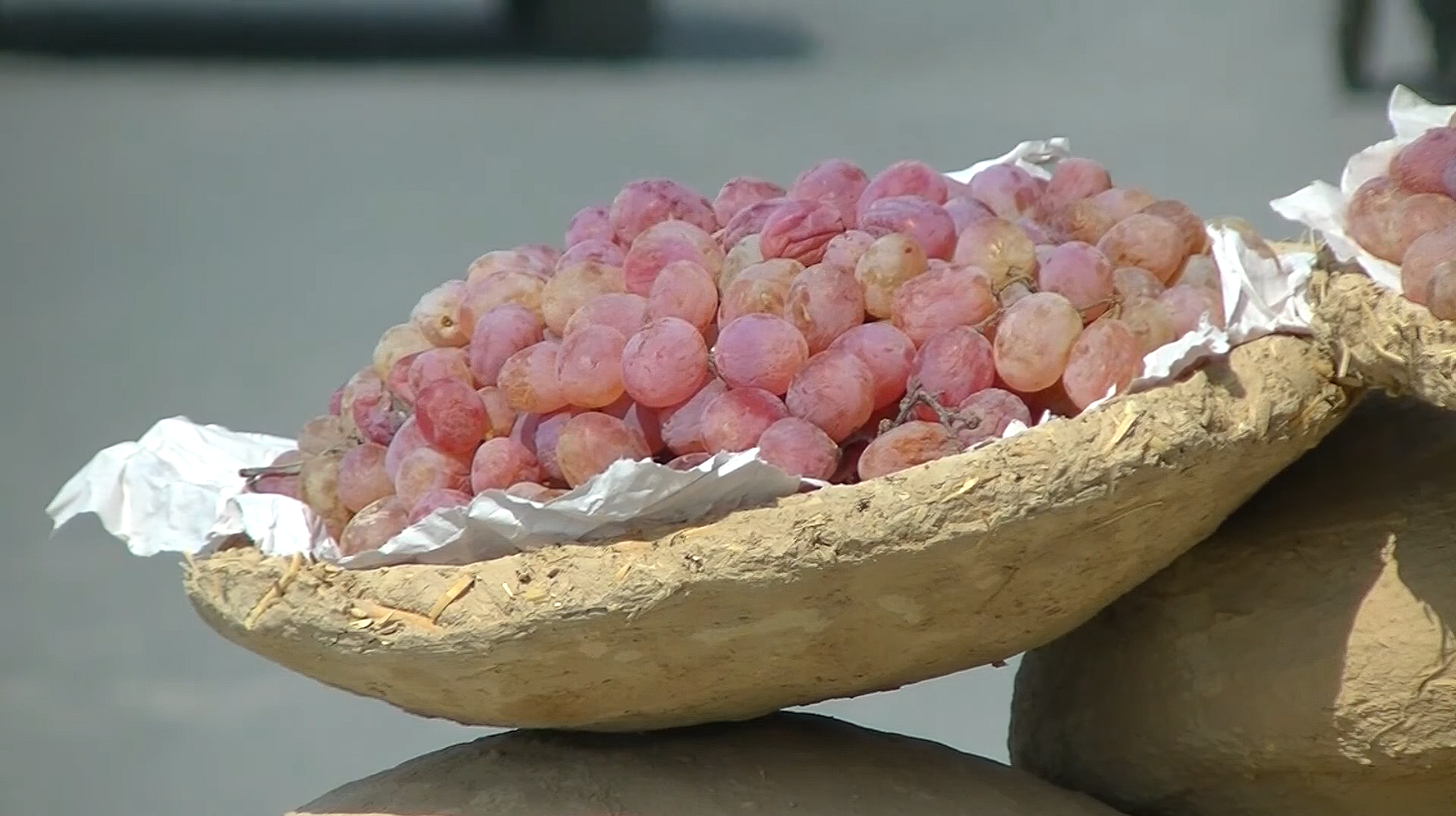
A paper-lined kangina, opened to access the grapes stored inside

Kangina (Dari (Note: Dari pronunciation: [kʰäŋ.giː.ná]): کنگینه, lit. 'treasure'), also called Gangina, is the traditional Afghan technique of preserving fresh fruit, particularly grapes, in airtight discs formed from mud and straw. The centuries-old technique is indigenous to Afghanistan's rural center and north, where remote communities that cannot import fresh fruit eat kangina-preserved fresh grapes throughout the winter, and merchants use kangina to safely store and transport grapes for sale at market. Grapes preserved using kangina in modern Afghanistan are typically of the thick-skinned Taifi or Kishmishi varieties, which are harvested later in the season and remain fresh in the mud vessels for up to six months.

Video of a kangina being opened

The method, a form of passive controlled-atmosphere storage, works by sealing fruit in the clay-rich mud, restricting flow of air, moisture and microbes, much as a plastic bag would. Discs are formed from two bowl-shaped pieces, which are sculpted from mud and straw, and baked in the sun before being filled with up to 1–2 kilograms (2.2–4.4 lb) of un-bruised fruit and sealed with more mud. They are kept dry and cool, away from direct sunlight. Gradual permeation of gas through the clay barrier allows oxygen to enter the container, keeping the grapes alive, while the elevated concentration of carbon dioxide inside the package inhibits the grapes' metabolism and prevents the growth of fungus. The grapes are prevented from drying out, and the mud absorbs liquid which would otherwise lead to bacterial and fungal growth.

The practice of storing grapes in mud and straw has been recorded as far back as the 12th century: in his Book of Agriculture, Sevillan agronomist Ibn al-'Awwam noted layering grapes with straw in mud-sealed glass containers or "cowpat bowls" as an extant technique of preservation in Andalusia.

Kangina are inexpensive, eco-friendly, and effective vessels for the preservation of fresh fruit. A 2023 study found kangina and polystyrene foam boxes to be the most effective vessels for preserving grapes. The containers are, however, heavy, unwieldy, and prone to absorbing moisture.
