= Robert Smock =

American scientist and professor (1908-1986)

Robert Mumford Smock
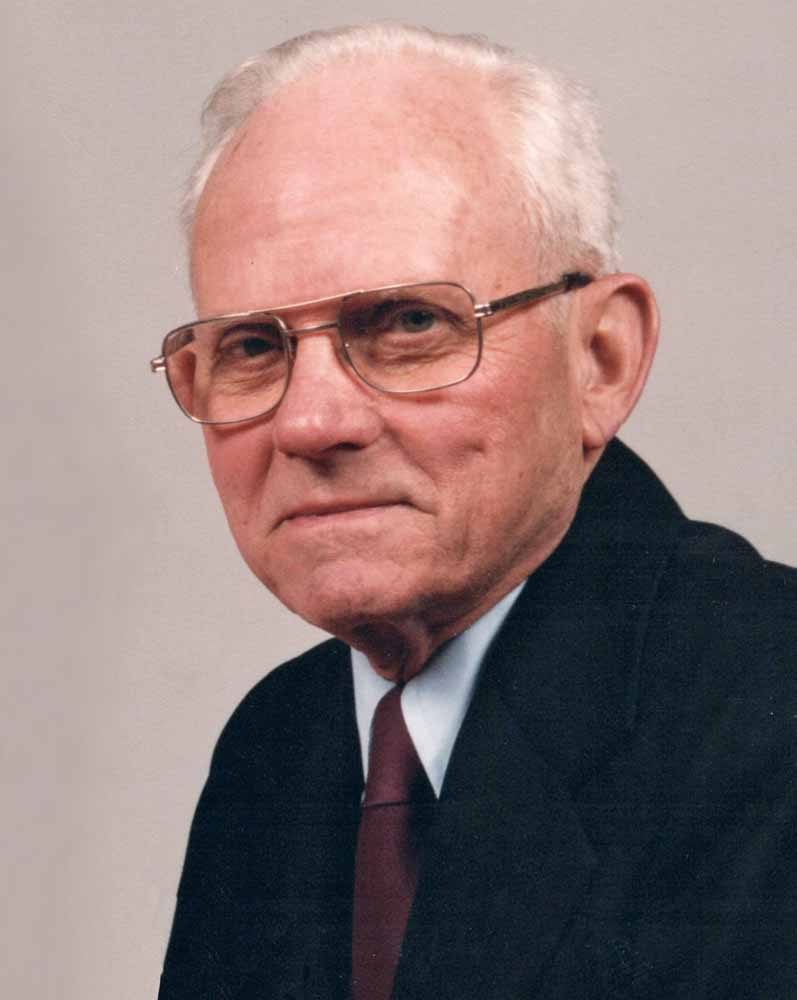
- Born: October 21, 1908; Erie, Pennsylvania, U.S.
- Died: April 22, 1986 (aged 77); Ithaca, New York, U.S.
- Spouse: Martha Smock
- Children: 3
- Scientific career
- Workplaces: Cornell University

Robert Mumford Smock (October 21, 1908 – April 22, 1986) was an American scientist and a professor at Cornell University. Known for his research for over two decades in the field of controlled atmosphere cold storage, which led to the use of controlled atmosphere rooms in the United States in the 1950s and later throughout the world. The method he developed made it possible to extend the shelf life of fruits, especially apples throughout the year.

== Biography ==
Smock was born in 1908 in Erie, Pennsylvania, to his father Grant Hibbard Smock, a dentist, and his mother Frances Mumford Smock, a housewife. He was the third of six brothers and sisters. He spent summers on a farm and wanted to become a farmer. Smock studied agriculture in college and then went on to study for a doctorate at Ohio State University. After an initial teaching stint at the University of California, Davis he accepted a position at Cornell University where he led a career of over fifty years as a researcher in the field of pomology (study of fruits).

== Career ==
Professor Smock had a huge influence on the growing, storage and consumption of apples throughout the United States and the entire world. His first studies were in the context of applying wax to apples and its effects.

=== Controlled atmosphere ===
From the late 1930s to the late 1950s, Smock studied the field of controlled atmosphere as part of his work at Cornell University. Smock researched techniques for using fruit after the harvest, especially apples, peaches, and plums. In his research, he tried to find a way to extend the shelf life of these fruits. In the late 1930s Smock visited the University of Cambridge in England to meet with researchers Franklin Kidd and Cyril West and to examine their research in the field of controlled atmosphere. After his visit, he returned to New York and began to engage in in-depth research in the field. He brought what he learned back to New York and adopted the controlled atmosphere technology for local apple varieties in the United States, mainly the McIntosh apple. Smock's original laboratory was located in the wet basement of an old barn near the university where he conducted experiments in which he placed different types of apples in rooms with different temperatures and different combinations of oxygen and carbon dioxide in order to test their effect on the fruits. By 1953 Smock was able to conduct research in large airtight storage rooms at Cornell. As a result of Smock's research, the first controlled atmosphere rooms were established in New York in the 1950s and allowed apple consumption to extend from the summer when the apples are picked to the following spring, throughout the United States.

The method of controlled atmosphere arrived to the United States and Canada in the 1950s and was used mainly for storing apples. In the mid-1950s, trucks began to be used to collect fruits and vegetables, which made it possible to grow and collect much larger quantities of fruits. This led to the need to preserve the fruits and then large storage rooms with controlled atmosphere began to be used throughout the United States. The controlled atmosphere method at this stage was extended throughout the world.

Smock developed recommendations for temperature, oxygen levels, and carbon dioxide levels that were used by all apple growers in the United States. The recommendations established back in the 1950s have been used for many years by apple growers in the United States and all over the world. In addition to developing these recommendations, he worked directly with fruit growers in order to determine recommendations regarding the structure of the controlled atmosphere rooms, the sealing of the building, measuring devices for the amount of oxygen and carbon dioxide in the rooms, and more. The growth in the commercial use of controlled atmosphere in New York and New England that formed the basis for growth in the rest of the United States can be directly attributed to the research of Robert Smock. His former graduate students, notably Archie Van Doren in Washington State, George Mattus in Virginia, F.W. Southwick in Massachusetts and D.H. Dewey in Michigan, helped to refine and disseminate controlled atmosphere storage. His Cornell colleague G. David Blanpied collaborated on controlled atmosphere research at the end of Smock's career.

=== Preventing scald in apples ===
Apples in storage tend to turn brown. To this day it is not clear what the source of the problem is, but it is known that it is caused by problematic and incorrect storage. This caused losses of millions of dollars every year to the apple growers of the world until Smock discovered that Diphenylamine and Ethoxyquin used immediately after picking prevented the problem. He researched for several years the combinations between the two materials until he discovered the ideal combination between them that gave a practical solution to the storage problems.

Smock was active in the United States Department of Agriculture in order to approve the use of these substances by the FDA. He collaborated with commercial chemists to develop a suitable formula. In addition, he worked on the development of equipment used by farmers in order to put these materials in the most appropriate way on the apples immediately after picking.

Smock's later studies dealt with minerals and how they affect the quality of apples.

== International activity ==
Smock was involved in the development of postharvest research and storage methods in several countries.

In 1957, he spent three months at an experimental station in Saharanpur, India, supported by a Ford Foundation grant, assisting in the establishment of a research program on the cold storage of mangoes. Following his research in India at the A.R. Fruit Research Station in Saharanpur, Smock co-authored a paper with P. K. Mukerjee, titled The Effect of Ripe Mangoes on Unripe Mangoes.

The following year, he spent six months in New Zealand, under a Fulbright grant, helping to introduce controlled-atmosphere storage methods.

In 1960, Professor Smock played an active role in establishing the refrigeration research laboratory in Israel. The laboratory was founded by Aryeh Sive, who had studied the fundamentals of the method under Smock at Cornell University. Smock spent several months in Israel helping to establish the laboratory and continued to support and advise it for many years. The laboratory had a significant impact on the cultivation and storage of various fruits in the Golan Heights and Upper Galilee.

Around 1967, Smock spent several months in the Philippines, where he worked on the storage and preservation of tropical fruits.

== Personal life ==
Smock was married to Martha Smock and was a father of three children. He died in 1986 at the age of 77 in Ithaca, New York.

== Awards ==
- L. M. Ware Award for Distinguished Teaching from the American Society for Horticultural Science, 1964.
- Lifetime Achievement Award of the American Society for Horticultural Science, 2026.

== Book ==
- Apples and Apple Products - 1950 - Robert Mumford Smock, Alfred Max Neubert

== Articles ==
- 1935 Some Physiological Studies with Calcium Cyanamide and Certain of Its Decomposition Products
- The Influence of Stored Apples on the Ripening of Other Apples Stored with Them Robert Mumford Smock Cornell University Agricultural Experiment Station, 1943 - Agriculture - 36 pages
- Studies on Storage Scald of Apples Robert Mumford Smock Cornell University Agricultural Experiment Station, 1945 - Agriculture - 29 pages
- Air Purification in the Apple Storage Robert Mumford Smock, Franklin Wallburg Southwick Cornell University Agricultural Experiment Station, 1948 - Air - 52 pages
- Studies on Respiration of Apples Robert Mumford Smock, Cecil Robert Gross Cornell University Agricultural Experiment Station, 1950 - Apples - 47 pages
- [1954] Effect of fungicides on McIntosh apple yield and quality Palmiter, D. H. (Deforest Harold); Smock, R. M. (Robert Mumford) - New York State Agricultural Experiment Station
- Methods of Scald Control on the Apple Robert Mumford Smock Cornell University Agricultural Experiment Station, New York State College of Agriculture, 1961 - Agriculture - 55 pages
