= Sierra cup =

Cup designed for camping, hiking, and backpacking

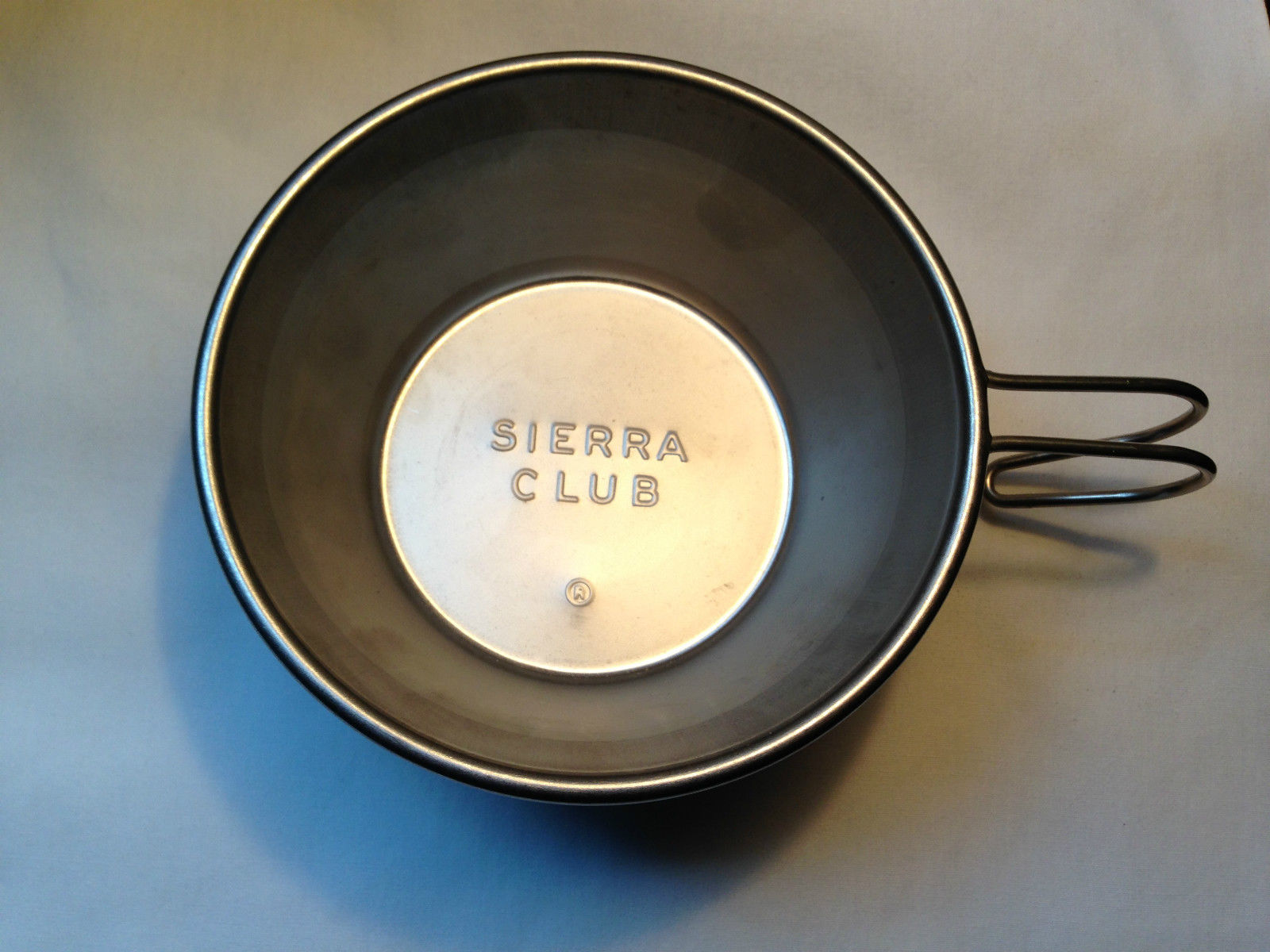
A Sierra cup with "Sierra Club" stamped into the bottom

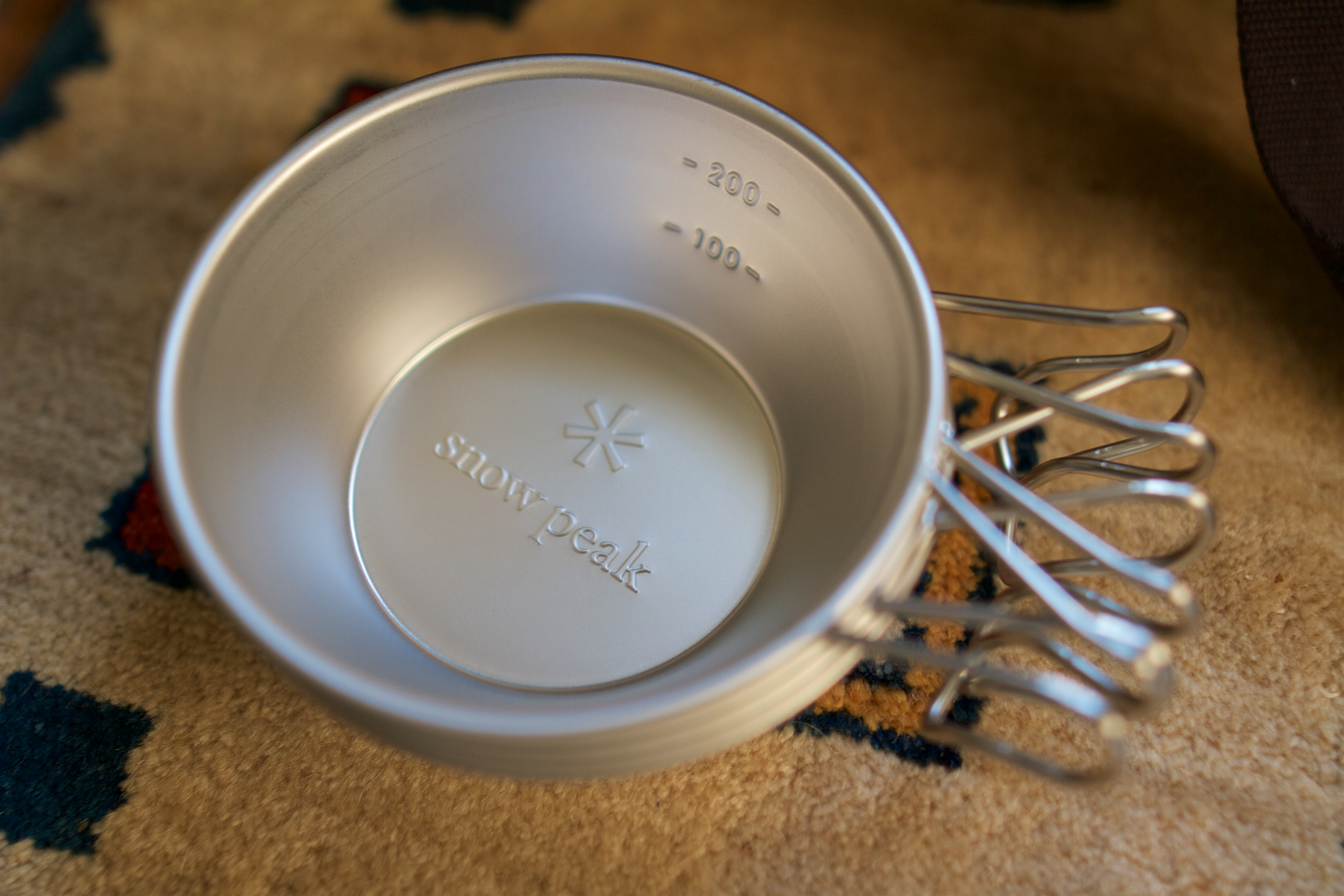
Several modern Sierra cups stacked on top of each other (markings for 100 ml and 200 ml)

A Sierra cup, Sierra Club cup, or Appalachian Mountain cup, is a multipurpose utensil designed for camping, hiking, and backpacking. Though designed for use as a cup and originally designed for collecting water from streams, its handle and wide top allows it to also be used as a ladle, bowl, or cookware. Named after the American environmental organization Sierra Club, Sierra cups were historically considered the "Swiss Army knife of camping", being the primary food utensil of campers and an icon of camping food for most of the 20th century.

Sierra cups are typically small containers, holding about 295 milliliters (10 fluid ounces). Sierra cups are wider at the top than bottom, allowing for stacking. Some variants have straight handles or handles that can fold away or be removed to save storage space. They typically have a fixed wire handle that is formed into a hook for attaching the cup to a belt.

While metal Sierra cups may be used for cooking food or purifying water, they were not designed for this use and do it poorly, as the broad rim increases the time necessary to boil water. Additionally, metal Sierra cups can become very hot very easily, which can burn the user when attempting to eat from it; burning one's lips on a Sierra cup while attempting to eat or drink was considered "standard practice" when they were in frequent use.

== History ==
The Sierra cup was invented in the early 20th century, perhaps as early as 1905. They were a direct evolution of the tin cups used by campers in the 19th century, including naturalist John Muir, who often brought a tin cup with him during his trips to the wilderness, and founded the Sierra Club in 1892. However, David Brower, the first executive director of the Sierra Club, stated in his 1990 autobiography that the Sierra cup is simply a modified imitation of the Appalachian Mountain Cup, which features a very similar design and was created by the Appalachian Mountain Club.

Sierra cups were originally made out of tin, but switched to stainless steel after World War II. Since then, modern Sierra cups have been made with other materials such as aluminum, titanium, and plastic.
