= Camping food =

Food designed for camping and backpacking

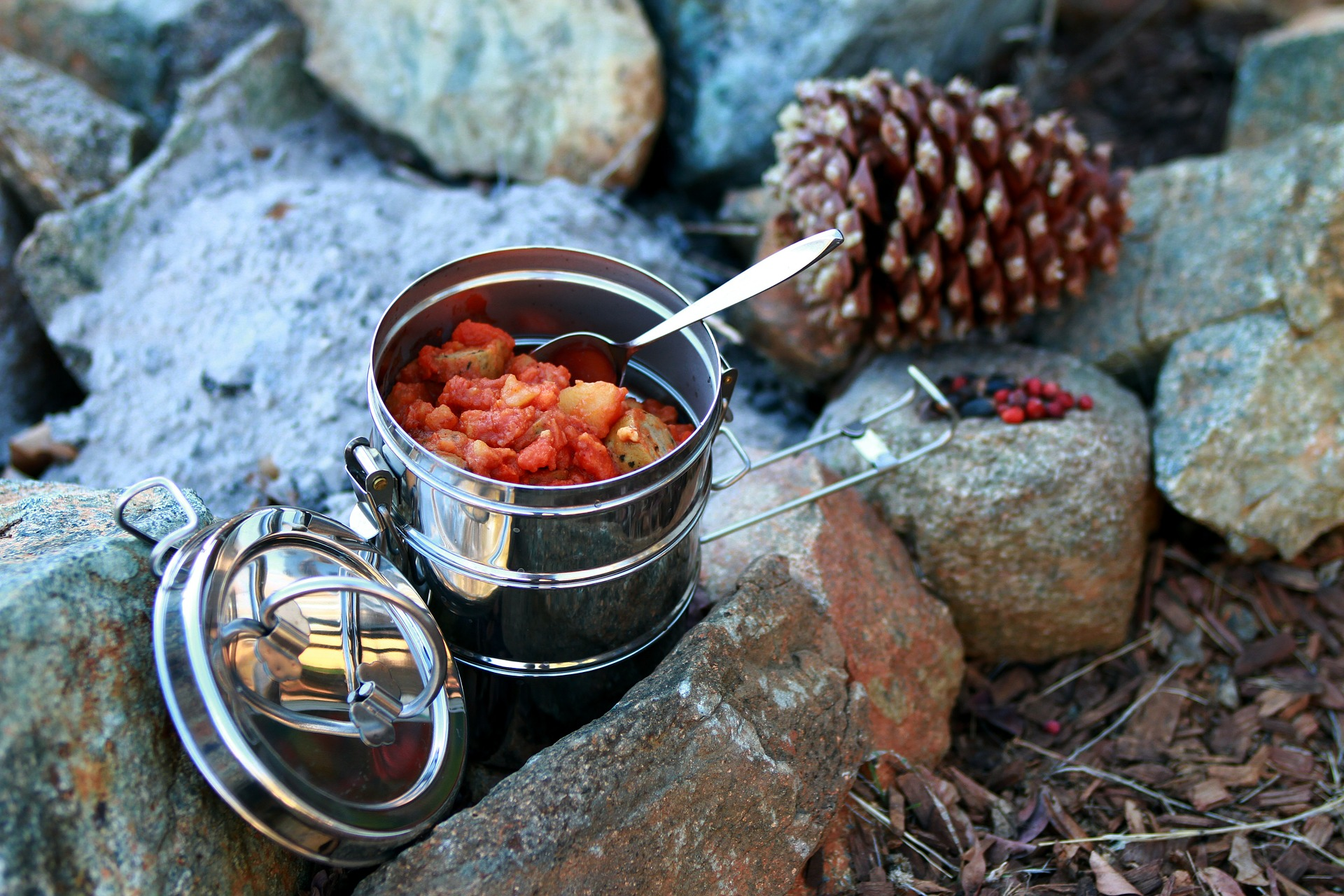
A tiffin carrier containing a stew

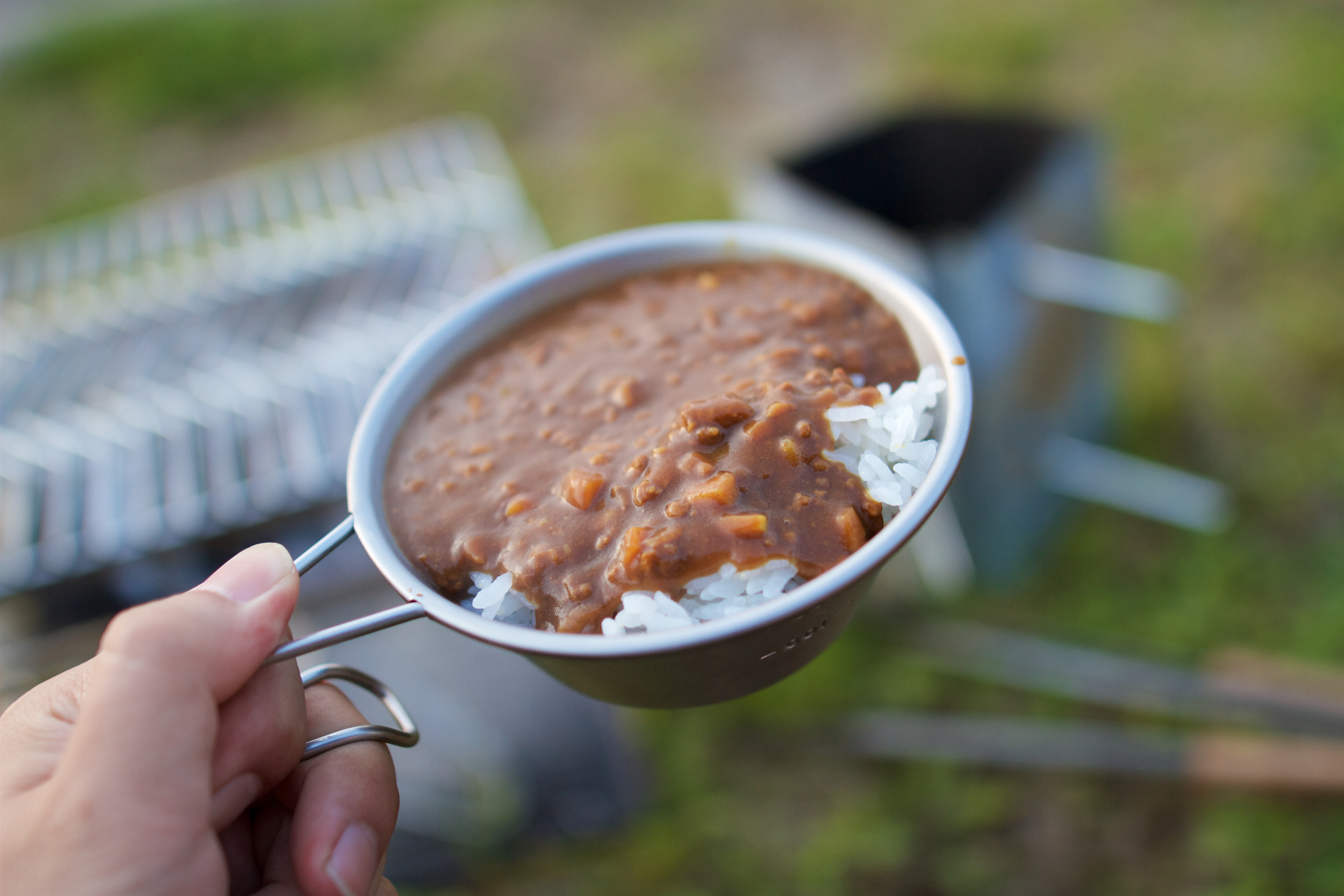
A Sierra cup filled with Japanese curry and rice, brought on a camping trip

Camping food is food brought on or designed for camping, hiking, and backpacking trips. The term also encompasses ingredients that can be used to make said foods. The primary differences relate to campers' and backpackers' special needs for foods that have appropriate cooking time, perishability, weight, and nutritional content. To address these needs, camping food is often made up of freeze-dried, dehydrated, pre-cooked, pre-prepared, or otherwise preserved foods that can last extended periods.

== Meal and ingredient requirements ==
=== Limited cooking time ===
Due to the difficulty of carrying large amounts of cooking fuel, campers often require their meals to be cooked in a short amount of time (5–20 minutes). Many campers prefer a ‘just add boiling water’ method of cooking, while others enjoy a more involved, and therefore often higher quality meal. The amount of cooking time can be disregarded if campers can cook over a campfire, however, due to the possibility of a burn ban being in place, campers do not often rely on this option.

=== Shelf stability ===
Camping foods are often shelf-stable—that is, they require no refrigeration. Campers may be outdoors for days or weeks at a time, and will often pack food for the entire trip. Campers will sometimes take fresh food that can be consumed in the first day or two of a hike but will usually not risk carrying perishable food beyond that timeframe. Campers hiking in the snow or other cold conditions or campers with access to a cold water source may be able to store perishable food in the snow or secure it in a bag and kept in the cold water to act as a refrigeration source.

=== Lightweight ===
Backpackers must carry everything with them so they require all of their gear and food to be as lightweight as possible. Campers often turn to freeze-dried and dehydrated meals and ingredients for this reason, but they will also sometimes take a pouch of tuna or some other ingredient with a high water content with them as a treat, providing that the item has nutritional value. Backpackers usually take empty containers back with them for recycling and proper disposal.

=== Nutrition content ===
Backpackers, canoeists, climbers, and other outdoor enthusiasts often cover many kilometres every day, consuming several kilojoules or thousands of calories to keep their energy levels high. Backpackers require an average of 2000 kJ (480 calories) per hour as well as higher sodium levels. Because of the high levels of nutritional burn and emphasis on weight, backpackers monitor the ratio of joules to grams (or calories to ounces) that their food provides. To ensure their bodies are properly nourished, campers must pay close attention to their meal plans.

== Ingredients ==
To prepare meals that work well outdoors, campers employ a variety of techniques. Campers are advised to prepare meals that are made of easy-to-prepare ingredients.

=== Freeze-dried ingredients ===
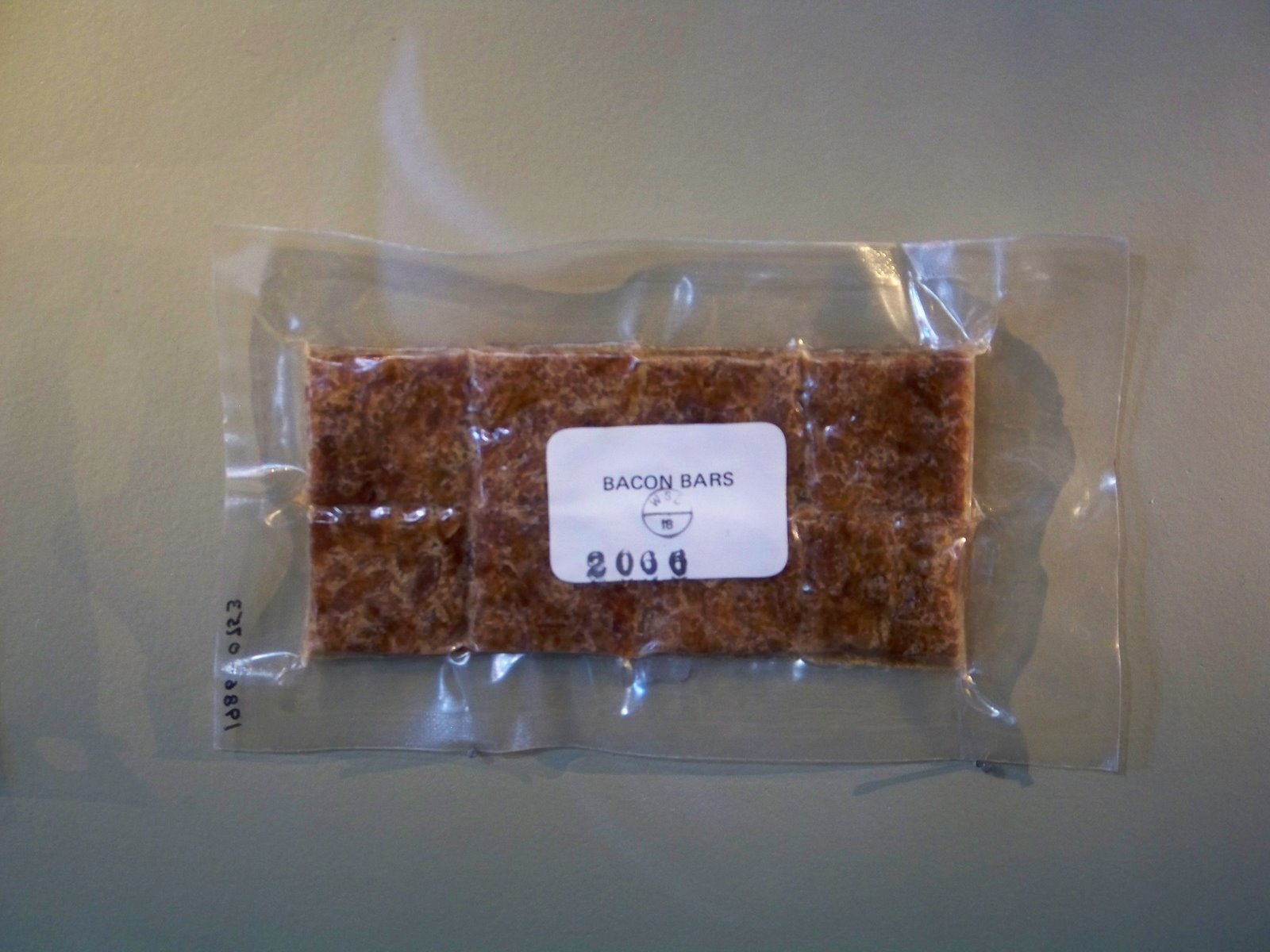
Freeze-dried foods, such as this bacon bar, are considered superior in camping applications.

Freeze-drying requires the use of heavy machinery and is not something that most campers can do on their own. Freeze-dried ingredients are often considered superior to dehydrated ingredients because they rehydrate at camp faster and retain more flavor than their dehydrated counterparts. Freeze-dried ingredients take so little time to rehydrate that they can often be eaten without cooking them first and have a texture similar to a crunchy chip.

Small amounts of freeze-dried ingredients are sometimes available for sale from emergency supply outlets or stores specific to camping. Freeze-dried ingredients that have not been combined into a meal are often hard to find and thus tend to be sought out by campers.

One of the first freeze-dried camping foods companies was Backpacker's Pantry in 1951, originally named Dri-lite Foods, invented after an ill-fated Girl Scout camping trip by Anne Benedict, becoming the first adventure food on the market.

=== Dehydrated meals and ingredients ===
Dehydration can reduce the weight of food by 60 to 90 percent by removing water through evaporation. Some foods dehydrate well, such as onions, peppers, and tomatoes. Dehydration often produces a more compact, albeit slightly heavier, result than freeze-drying.

Full meals or individual ingredients may be dehydrated. Dehydration of individual ingredients allows the flexibility to cook different meals based on available ingredients, while precooked and dehydrated meals offer greater convenience. Several cookbooks and online stores specialize in dehydrated foods.

=== Pre-prepared contents ===
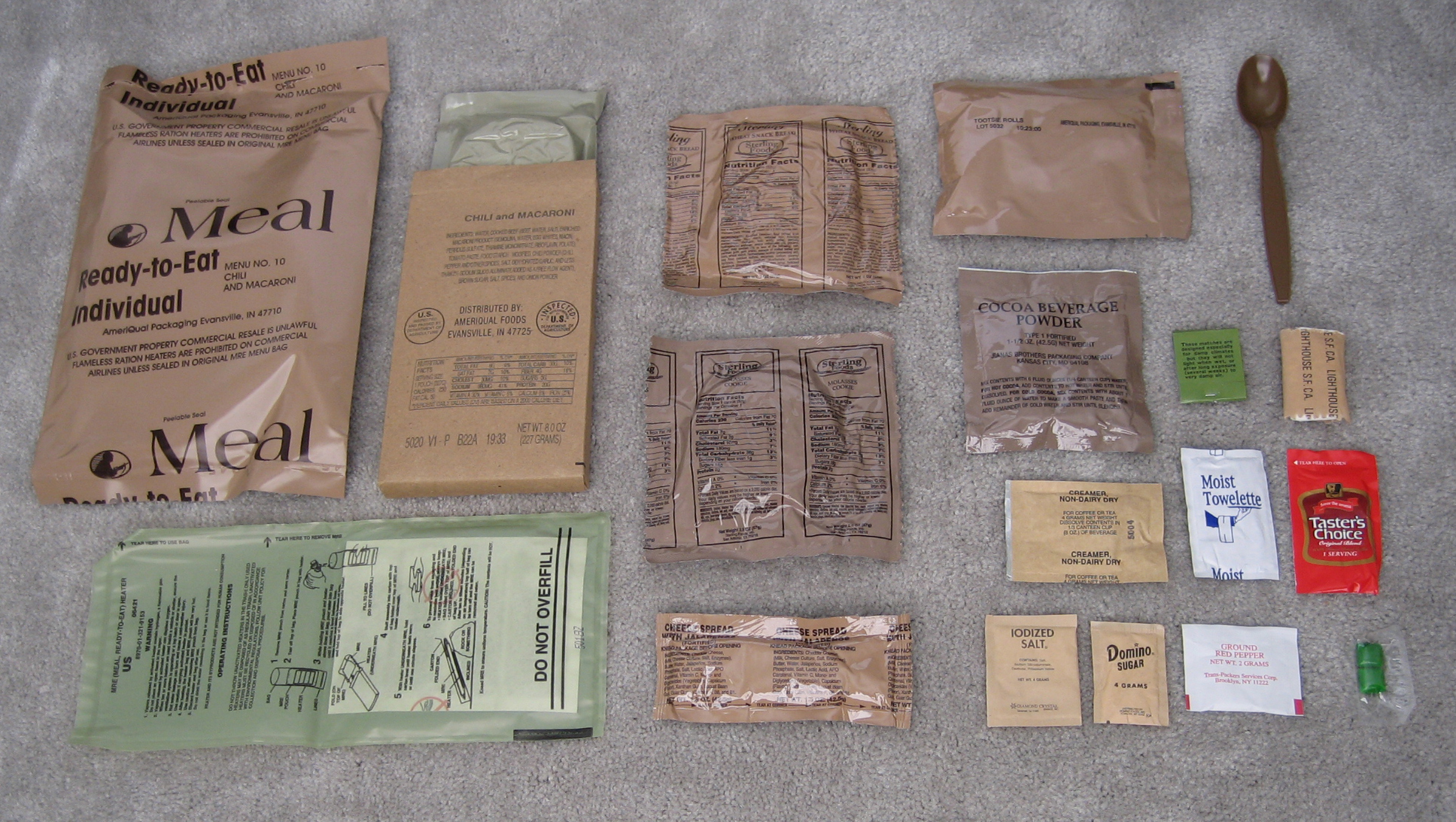
Contents of a Meal, Ready-to-Eat field ration

Field rations are sometimes used by campers. These meals contain pre-prepared or precooked foods in shelf-stable packaging, are designed to provide enough calories and nutrients to sustain an individual for a full day, and often come with their heaters, making them ideal for use in camping.

Canned foods and instant foods are also sometimes used.

=== Common ingredients ===
The final type of ingredients available to campers are those that are typically found in the grocery store. Some examples of these types of food are polenta, grits, quick-cooking pasta (such as angel hair pasta), ramen, instant potatoes, dried soups, jerky and pouch meats such as tuna, Spam or salmon.

When using these common ingredients, campers often repackage them to reduce packaging or combine them into a meal-ready package, therefore reducing prep time at camp. The main requirement that campers look for in these types of ingredients is the cooking time with 20 minutes being the longest amount of cook time that most campers will tolerate.

== Backcountry cooking methods ==
=== Camping stoves and cookware ===
There is a large variety of camping stoves on the market ranging in specialty from being extremely lightweight to focusing on using very little fuel. The majority of campers rely on a stove for their cooking needs as they boast several advantages over cooking over a campfire. Since most camping stoves have an adjustable heat source, they can be much easier to use than a campfire. The ability to quickly adjust the flame to reduce from a boil to a simmer, for example, is considered invaluable to many campers. Campfires can take a long time to start and get to a point where they are suitable for cooking over. Since a cookstove can be ready in minutes, this is an advantage for many campers. While butane is the most commonly used fuel for camping stoves, propane is preferred in winter as it has a lower boiling point. Many types of cookware exist for outdoor cooking.

=== Campfire ===
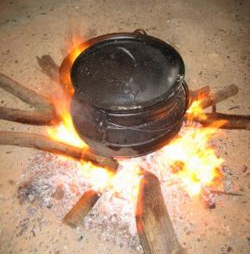
A cast iron potjie on a fire, very similar to a Dutch oven

Wilderness areas can often have a burn ban, prohibiting people from starting a fire. If a camper were to rely on the campfire method as their only source of cooking heat, they could find themselves in an unlucky situation. Cooking over a campfire can lead to pots and pans darkened with soot. Soot can be extremely difficult to remove and, if left on the pan, can easily rub off onto clothing or the inside of the backpack.

Campers relying on the use of a campfire do not have to carry the extra weight of a cook stove and may rely on a campfire to reduce their pack weight. Campfires provide a great amount of warmth while cookstoves provide none. On cold days, a campfire is often welcome. Leave No Trace discourages the use of a campfire as a source of heat. Campers making a campfire in the same location time after time can deplete the available wood in the area, which impacts the natural habitat of the animals. Campers are also more likely to inadvertently leave food scraps around the fire pit, which could attract animals.

=== Chemical heaters ===
Some camping food is ready to eat and maybe warmed using chemical heaters, such as the flameless heaters used in field rations or self-heating food packaging.

=== Solar cooking ===
Solar cooking provides a clean and safe alternative to campfire. Using solar cookers is easy and inexpensive since they do not require fuel to work. Most solar cookers also provide the minimum required temperature during cloudy days to prepare food. Despite many advantages that solar cooking provides it is unusable during the nighttime and it will not provide heat and protection against wild animals like a campfire does.

== See also ==
- Military rations
- Space food
- Camping
- Campfire
- Outdoor cooking
