= Campfire ban =

Restrictions on fires

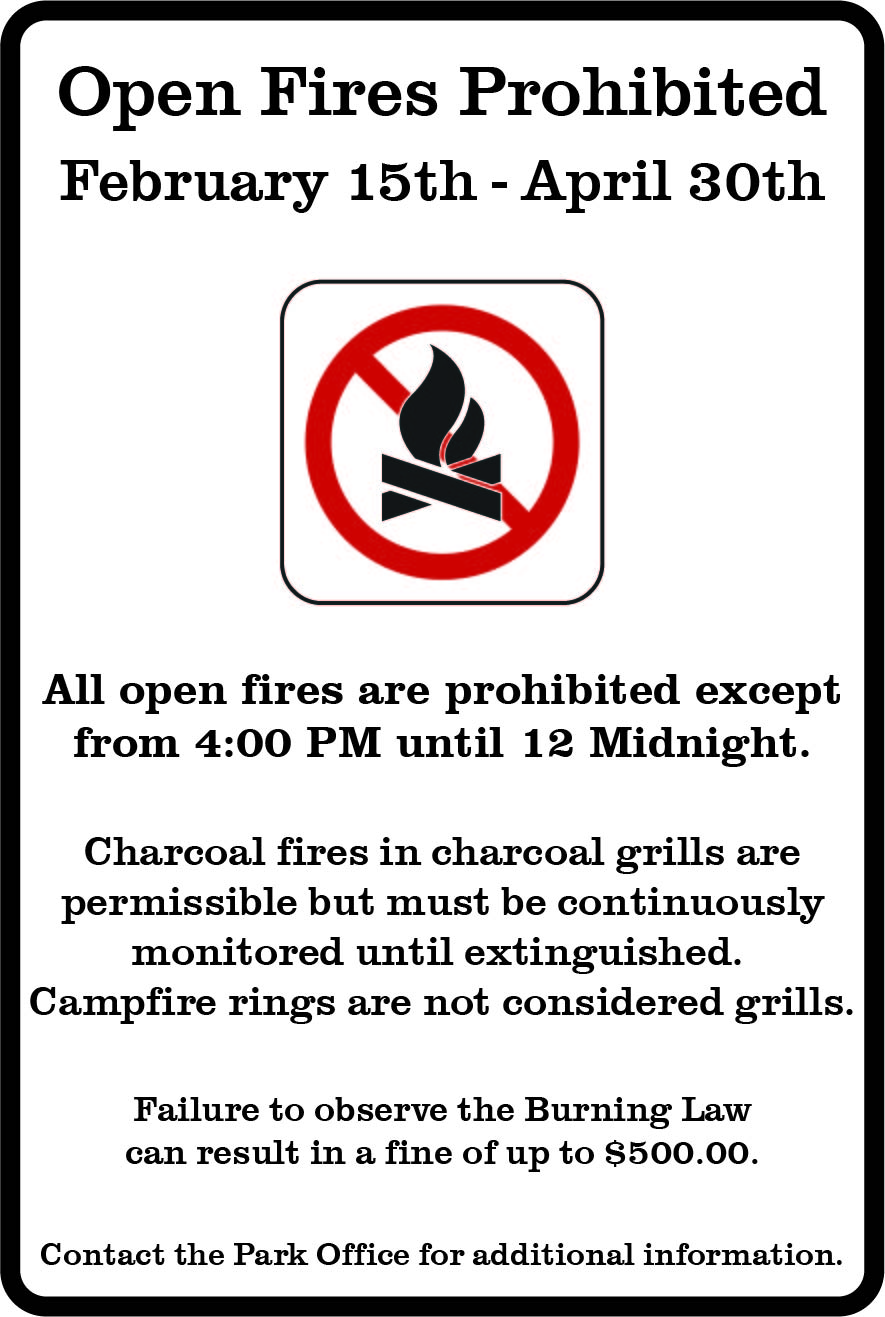
Campfire ban sign in Virginia

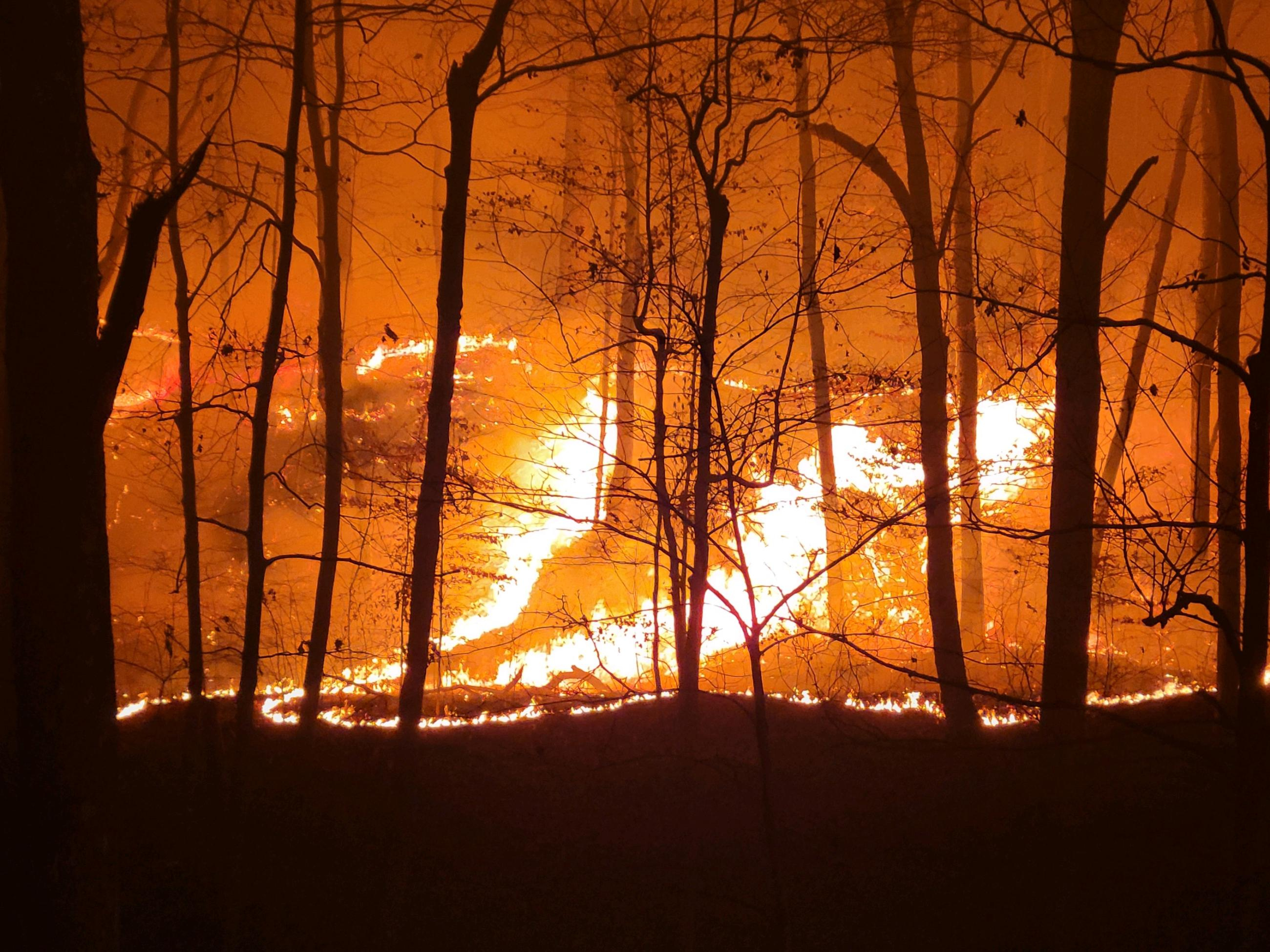
The large Kimble Complex Fire in Wayne National Forest, Ohio (2022)

A campfire ban or burn ban is a restriction issued by government or administrative agencies that prohibits all outdoor use of open fire including bonfires, with certain exceptions, during periods of high wildfire risk. Such bans help prevent accidental wildfires by eliminating ignition sources when vegetation is dry and winds are strong.

Regardless of fire bans, warnings or weather conditions, the person lighting and supervising the fire is always responsible for preventing the fire from spreading. The humidity in the ground can vary locally, and even if it has rained, the ground can still be very dry. Even if the fire hazard is not particularly high, careless handling of fire can still lead to a wildfire.

== Legislation ==
In Norway, there is a campfire ban from April 15 to September 15, which means that it is not permitted to light campfires and other open fires. However, many municipalities have designated bonfire and barbecue areas that are permitted for use year-round. During dry periods, local and national total bans on open fires may still be introduced, even in approved areas.

In Sweden, the so-called «eldningsförbud» is enforced by each len (county) or municipality.

In Finland, forest fire warnings are issued by the Meteorological Institute. The warnings are issued county-by-county, except in Lapland where they can also be issued municipally. Typically, the warnings run from early May to late September, and if necessary from April to May. In Finland, it is generally forbidden to light a fire without the landowner's permission, except in emergencies.

== See also ==
- Air quality law, sometimes motivating a burn ban to improve urban air quality
- Camping food, often with a short cooking time, good shelf life, low mass and high nutritional content
- Forest fire, uncontrolled fire in forests or open spaces
