= Louis Odier =

Swiss physician, medical campaigner, and scholar (1748–1817)

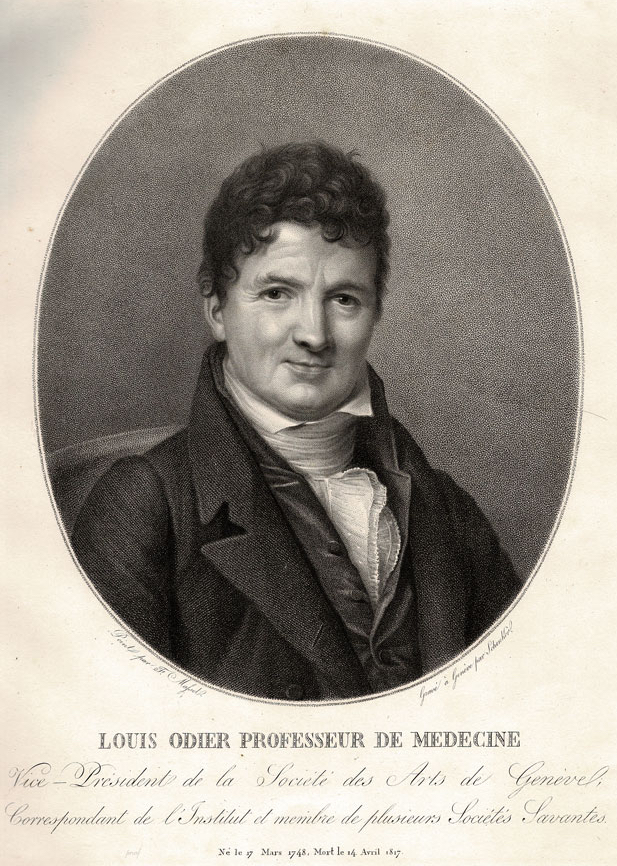
- Born: March 17, 1748; Geneva, Republic of Geneva
- Died: 14 April 1817 (aged 69); Geneva, Switzerland
- Medical career
- Profession: physician, publisher, politician
- Institutions: University of Geneva

Louis Jean Odier (March 17, 1748 – April 14, 1817, Geneva) was a Genevan and then very briefly Swiss physician, medical campaigner and advisor; he was also a translator and publisher of medical texts, particularly from English. He was a major figure in medicine in 18th-century Europe because of his promotion of vaccination against smallpox and more broadly his lobbying for medical funds and usage of data from historical medical records, relating them to probability in life expectancy and subsequent advice for economic planning.

== Early life and family ==
He was born in the then independent Republic of Geneva, the son of Louise de Villas and Antoine Odier, a merchant; theirs was a Protestant family. His brother was Jacques-Antoine Odier, who became a cotton manufacturer and merchant; his nephew was Antoine Odier, a Genevan-born French politician and banker. When he was a student of philosophy in Geneva, he founded a "Literary Society" and a "Philosophical Society" along with three friends. He moved to Edinburgh in 1767 to study medicine at the Edinburgh Medical School, then the leading English-speaking centre for medical studies. He was awarded his doctorate in 1770 and remained in the city until 1772. While there he was elected president of the Medical Society of Edinburgh. He also became the close friend of François-Étienne de La Roche, a fellow Genevan, who became a physician and scientist. He joined a number of courses in other European cities: at St. Thomas's Hospital, London, he attended courses by George Fordyce, and William Hunter; at the University of Leiden, he followed Hieronymus David Gaubius; in Paris, he attended courses of Pierre Joseph Macquer and Guillaume-François Rouelle.

== Career ==
On his return to Geneva in 1772, he passed through London and Paris, where he had the opportunity to observe victims of smallpox and the effects of inoculation, also seeing the innovations of the proponents of inoculation and witnessing the criticism they received. In 1769, Dr. Jobst Bose, a Holstein official living in Göttingen, had shown that protection against smallpox can be acquired through ingestion of the milk of sick cows, and in 1774 the Yetminster farmer Benjamin Jesty – personally aware of the lack of susceptibility of cowpox suffers to smallpox – successfully immunised his wife and two sons with a vaccine during a smallpox epidemic, by transferring a small quantity of the pustular matter from cowpox (a less virulent form of the disease) taken from one of his cattle and applying it via a scratch on their arms.

Odier married his childhood sweetheart, Suzanne Baux (daughter of Judith Tardieu and Jean-Louis Baux, a merchant) in 1773; she had had an undiagnosed illness for some time and he sought professional advice from William Cullen his former professor at Edinburgh; she died in 1778, without issue. In 1780 he married Andrienne Lecointe (daughter of Louise Galiffe and Gédéon Lecointe, a pastor); they had five children: Jean-Louis-Gédéon, Jacques-Louis, Ami, Amélie and Anne-Louise.

Odier practised as a physician in Geneva between 1773 and 1817. He began his career by teaching a chemistry course, developing the theory of latent heat which was recently discovered by Scottish chemist Joseph Black but had yet to be widely disseminated outside Great Britain. He discussed objections in continental Europe against the practice of vaccination in letters to Anton de Haen, which were published in the Journal de Médecin (volume 40). The fourth letter was published in 1777. Odier had obtained data from London relating to the number of deaths from smallpox; he recognised an increase but attempted to show that it was not attributable to inoculation. As such, he was one of the Genevan médecins voyageurs, along with others such as Louis-André Gosse. He admired the health plans of Johann Peter Frank and Oxford University's Radcliffe fellowships and promoted similar ideas to Swiss and French companies and authorities. He campaigned for official recognition only of the views of medically-trained physicians in medical matters.

In 1778, Odier published data from the mortuary in Geneva (for 1777 and 1778) in the Memoirs of the Geneva Society for the Promotion of the Arts and Agriculture. Included were tables for "calculating the probability of life," which he stated would be useful for economists and financiers, for annuities, evaluation of differences in the population, determination of the course of epidemics and appreciation of different causes of mortality. Odier became a disciple of the Genevan doctor Theodore Tronchin, an early advocate of vaccination against smallpox.

In 1789, as secretary of the University of Geneva, Odier applied for the vacant chair of medicine after becoming the medical advisor to bankers who were setting up the annuities he had written about. In his table of mortality, probability of life expectancy and average life expectancy in Geneva from 1560 to 1760 (first published in the Journal de Genève of 9 July 1791 and also the Parisian journal, La Médecine Eclairée) he provided advice on the best people to carry annuities. One of the so-called Thirty Immortals of Geneva – a group of girls whose longevity was the basis of a large public loan of Louis XVI – was his own daughter.

He was instrumental in introducing vaccination into France and Switzerland after Edward Jenner's 1796 publication of a method for controlling smallpox by transferring cowpox. In 1760, Daniel Bernoulli had already shown that, despite the risks, the earlier practice of variola inoculation would increase life expectancy by three years, but it sparked many debates. Odier translated the works of Jenner and others, and the first usage of the word 'vaccine' outside of the English language was in his translations. The process of vaccination became widely known in relatively popular science journalism from late 1798. In 1799 Jean de Carro repeated Jenner's experiment on his sons; the process was then established in Paris, with Napoléon I ensuring that his son, the King of Rome, received the preventive treatment. On January 14, 1805, Odier attacked the stance of the Savoyard and Valais priests, whom he blamed for the slow take-up of the vaccine on the outskirts of Geneva. In France, there was continued resistance from the clergy, led by Armand de Roquelaure (commander of the Order of the Holy Spirit, first chaplain to Louis XV and later archbishop of Mechelen).

A physician-philosopher fed by the spirit of the Age of Enlightenment, Louis Odier also took part in the writing of a weekly journal, published under the title of fr:Journal de Genève in the years 1789, 1790 and 1791. He was a member of the Council of Two Hundred in 1788 and then worked to draft a Geneva Penal Code, after the annexation of Geneva by the young French Republic in 1798. In 1815, he wrote to Charles Aubert, then a partner in Lyon of the house of Odier, Juventin & Cie – active in fabric trading and banking – to convince him to create a bank together in Marseille.
