= St. Catherine of Siena Parish (New Castle County, Delaware) =

Church building in Delaware, United States

Coordinates: 39.75025°N 75.62431°W

Saint Catherine of Siena Parish is located in unincorporated New Castle County, Delaware, with a Wilmington postal address. It has a Roman Catholic church located on Centerville Road with over 1100 families. The original church was founded in the 1960s by the surrounding Catholic community. A new church was recently built in 1993 and the original church foundation is now the St. Catherine gymnasium. Many of the original founders and their families are still present. New arriving families include Mexican families. Certain masses are available in Spanish.

The Saint Catherine of Siena Elementary School graduated its last class in 2011 before closing and merging into the All Saints Catholic School along with St. Matthew's Elementary school in Wilmington and Corpus Christi Elementary school in Elsmere. The school building is now owned by the government and is used for space for a charter school. Four hundred children attend the religious education/Christian formation weekly. The St. Catherine high school youth and middle school youth groups stay active and do work-camps in the summer. For those families speaking Spanish, there is a bilingual program.
