= Shelby County Schools =

Shelby County Schools may refer to:

- Shelby County Schools (Alabama), Shelby County, Alabama
- Shelby County Public Schools, Shelby County, Kentucky
- Shelby County Schools (now Memphis-Shelby County Schools), Shelby County, Tennessee

== See also ==
- Shelby County (disambiguation)
