= Sumter County School District =

Sumter County School District or variations may refer to:

- Sumter County School District (Georgia)
- Sumter County School District (Alabama)
- Sumter County School District (Florida)
