= Self-heating food packaging =

Food packaging that uses exothermic reactions to heat its contents

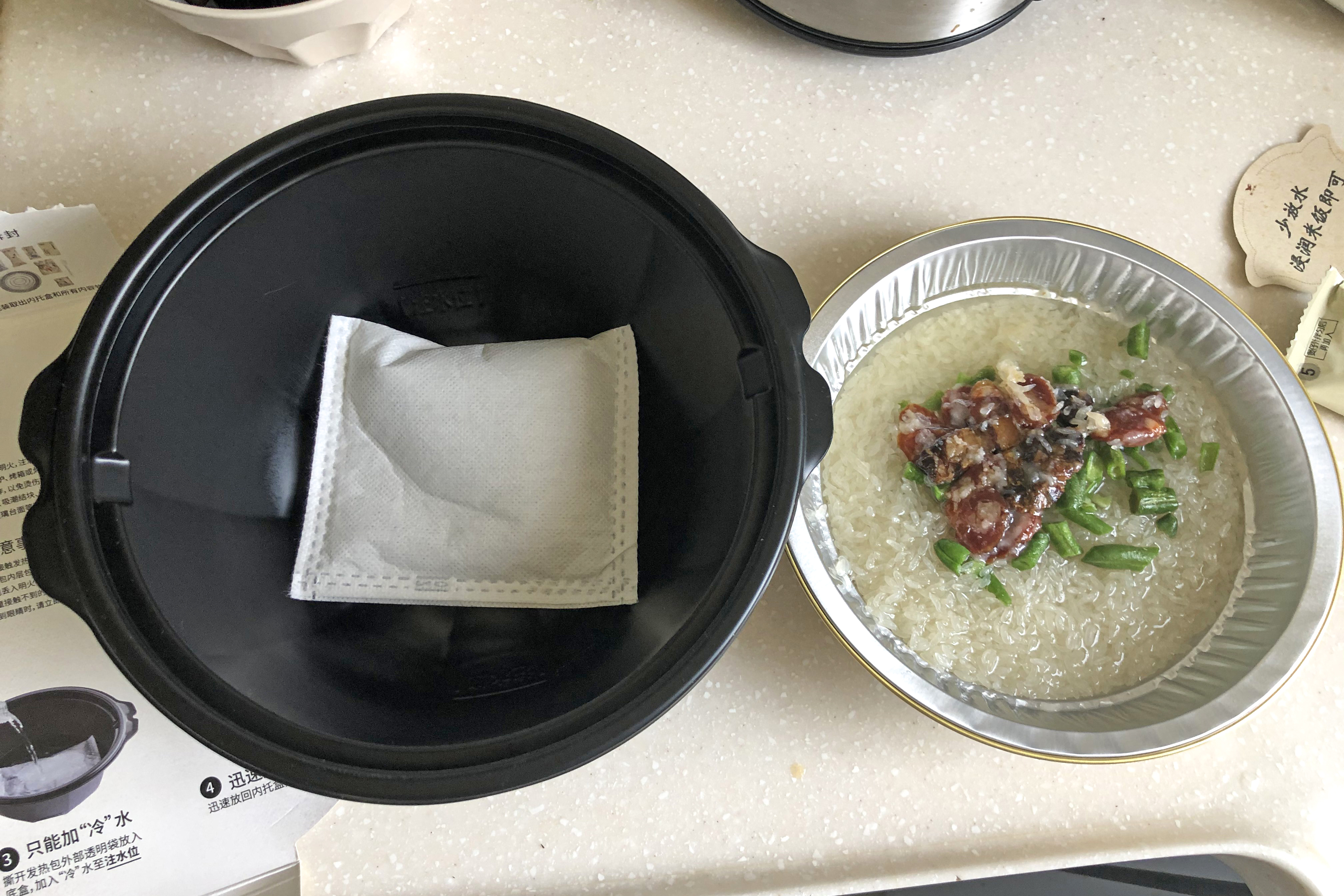
Self-heating rice with quicklime and water as heating source, taken before adding water to quicklime

Self-heating food packaging is active packaging with the ability to heat food contents without external heat sources or power, usually using an exothermic chemical reaction. Packets can also be self-cooling. These packages are useful for military operations, during natural disasters, or whenever conventional cooking is not available. They are often used for military field rations, camping food, instant food, or other types of food intended for preparation where proper cooking facilities or methods are unavailable or less ideal.

== Chemistry ==
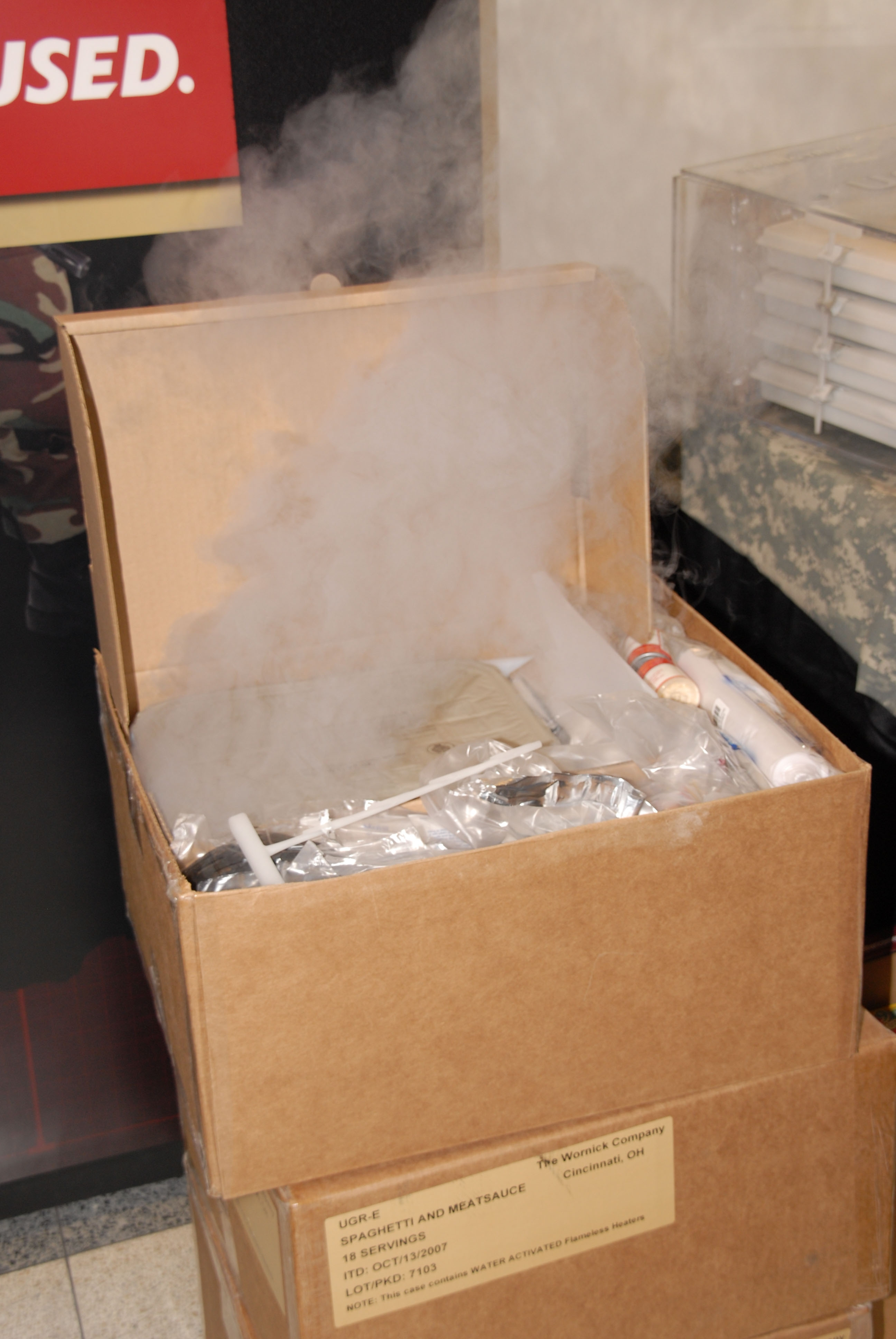
A Unitized Group Ration – Express self-heating field ration being heated in its box

The source of the heat for the self-heated can is an exothermic reaction that the user initiates by pressing on the bottom of the can. The can is manufactured as a triple-walled container. A container for the beverage is surrounded by a container of the heating agent separated from a container of water by a thin breakable membrane. When the user pushes on the bottom of the can, a rod pierces the membrane, allowing the water and heating agent to mix. The resulting reaction releases heat and thus warms the beverage which it is surrounding.

The heating agent and responsible reaction vary from product to product. Calcium oxide is used in the following reaction:

CaO(s)+ H_{2}O(l) → Ca(OH)_{2}(s)

Copper sulfate and powdered zinc can also be used, but this process is less efficient:

CuSO_{4}(s) + Zn(s) → ZnSO_{4}(s) + Cu(s)

Anhydrous calcium chloride is often used as well. In this case, no chemical reaction occurs, instead the heat of solution is generated.

Commercial heat sources for self-heating food packaging use an exothermic (heat releasing) reaction, for which there are several common formulations. These include:

- Quicklime aka calcium oxide, and water. Quicklime, inexpensive and readily available, is generally recognized by the FDA as safe. The product of the reaction is calcium hydroxide.
- Finely powdered magnesium metal alloyed with a small amount of iron, and table salt, actuated by adding water, as in an MRE flameless ration heater.

Some newer formulations use a Thermite-like reaction between a more reactive metal powder such as aluminum or magnesium, with a less reactive metal oxide such as iron oxide or silicon dioxide.

During World War II Heinz took a different approach, using a mechanism developed by Imperial Chemical Industries which involved igniting a smokeless fuel in the can.

== Design ==
Self-heating cans have dual chambers, one surrounding the other. In one version, the inner chamber holds the food or drink, and the outer chamber houses chemicals which undergo an exothermic reaction when combined. When the user wants to heat the contents of the can, a ring on the can—when pulled—breaks the barrier which keeps the chemicals in the outer chamber apart from the water. In another type, the chemicals are in the inner chamber and the beverage surrounds it in the outer chamber. To heat the contents of the can, the user pushes on the bottom of the can to break the barrier separating the chemical from the water. This design has the advantages of being more efficient (less heat is lost to the surrounding air) as well as reducing excessive heating of the product's exterior, causing possible discomfort to the user. In either case, after the heat from the reaction has been absorbed by the food, the user can enjoy a hot meal or drink.

== History ==
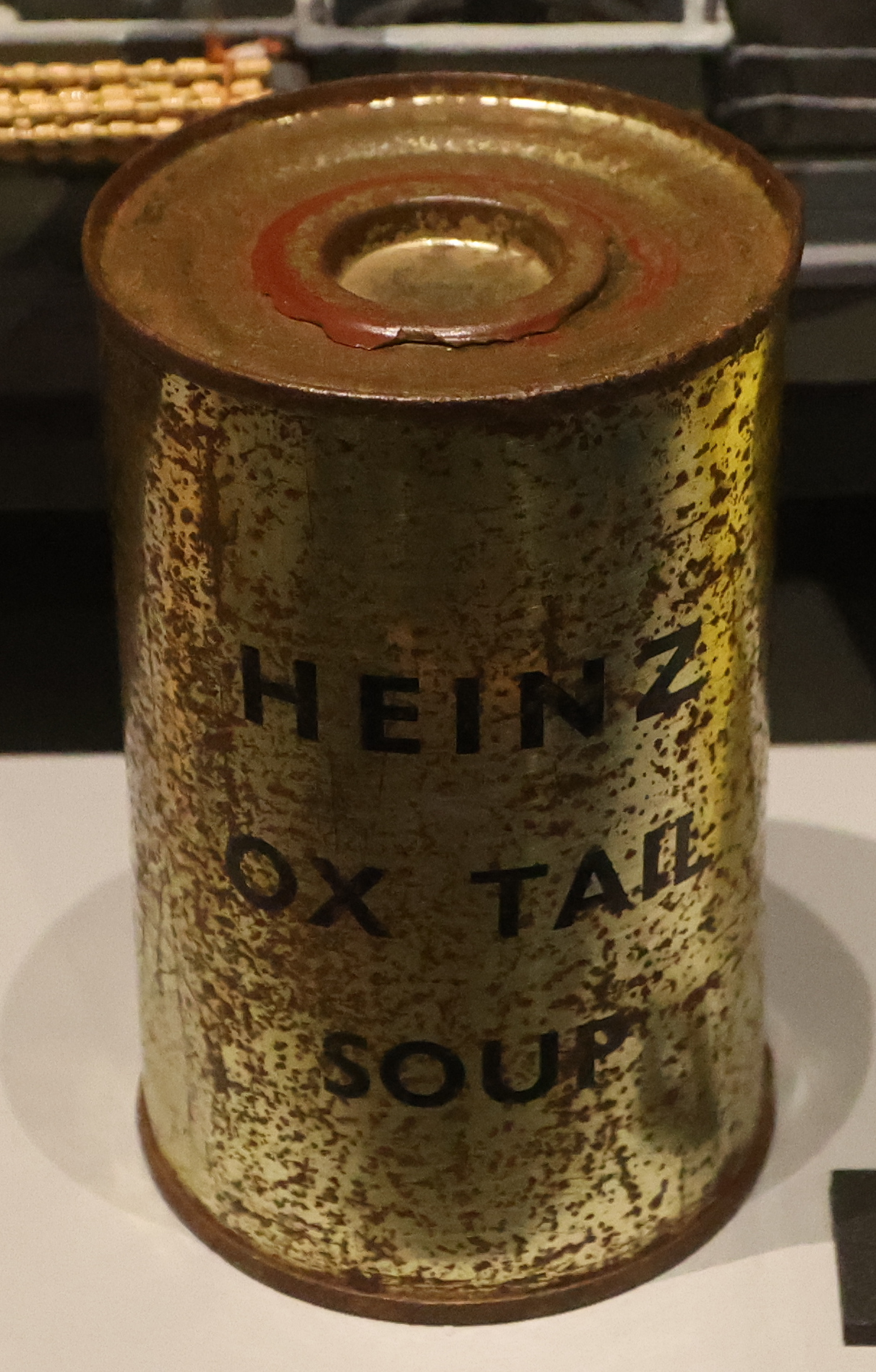
A self-heating can of oxtail soup produced by Heinz during World War II

Designs for self-heating food packaging date back to at least 1907.

During World War II, Britain introduced them to troops rations for the Normandy landings using the ICI smokeless fuel mechanism. This mechanism was not fool-proof and the cans could sometimes explode. Cans using this mechanism continued to see some use after World War II, with some making their way to the Falkland Islands and Dependencies Aerial Survey Expedition.

== See also ==
- Beverage can
- Flameless ration heater
