= School of Communication Studies, Panjab University =

Institute in Chandigarh, India

Coordinates: 30.764°N 76.771°E

The School of Communication Studies is an institute for Journalism and communication studies in India which is a part of the Panjab University located in Chandigarh (India). The School began in 1941 in the University of the Punjab, Lahore (now in Pakistan), it is the oldest institute of mass communication in South Asia. The School was founded by Prof. Prithvi Pal Singh, who studied journalism in the University of Missouri in Columbia, Missouri, United States and later established the institute.

== Courses offered ==
- PhD programme: In this program, students can work for their Ph.D. in very varied specialties within print, broadcast, and online journalism, including photojournalism, feature writing, sports journalism, business journalism, participatory journalism, press laws, science communication, development communications, health communications, investigative journalism, readability studies communication theories.
- Master of Arts (Journalism and Mass Communication): This program is a comprehensive course including all areas of mass communication: print journalism, broadcast journalism, media management, public relations, advertising and communication research. Students undertake a number of practical training activities on a day-to-day basis, and engage in internship in a media organization for two months during their last semester. Evaluation hinges upon a continuous assessment of the students.
- Post graduate diploma in Advertising and Public Relations
- Post graduate diploma in Journalism and Mass Communication
- Post graduate diploma in Radio Production

== Facilities ==
- Laboratories: Computer Lab with 30 computers, TV Studio, PCR & Video Editing Room (Macintosh Computer systems equipped with Final Cut Pro), Print Lab and Preview Theatre
- Library: Over 1500 Books are available in the School library and over 2000 in the University Central Library. The School also subscribes to over 15 newspapers and magazines besides research journals. An extensive collection of books and journals related to the discipline of Journalism & Mass Communication are available in the Main Library.

== Jyotirgamaya: 91.2 MHz ==
The community radio station of Panjab University was inaugurated on 13 February 2011. The station offers 4 broadcasts a day for over 10 hours duration. Having been set up by the School of Communication Studies, the CRS also acts as a training ground for the students of electronic media.

The content is generated by the students of the school with active help of the faculty and staff. The station provides internships to students and training to interested members of the public. It also undertakes activities such as the 72 hours marathon programming for awareness generation and community involvement.

The radio programmes can be heard over a range of 10 km.

== Notable alumni ==
- Shekhar Gupta, Editor-in-Chief, The Indian Express
- H. K. Dua, Member of Parliament (Rajya Sabha) and former Editor-in-Chief, The Tribune
- Ayushmann Khurrana, actor
- Radhe Krishan, Communication Scholar
