= Synthetic catalytic scavenger =

A synthetic catalytic scavenger is an artificial anti-oxidant that has been demonstrated to extend cellular life. It was successful in C. elegans and was effective in rat trials. Studies have shown that synthetic catalytic scavengers have superoxide dismutase and catalase activities which prevented injuries from reactive oxygen species, helping promote the livelihood of tissues.
