= Oxygen scavenger =

Substance able to chemically absorb oxygen in the surrounding air

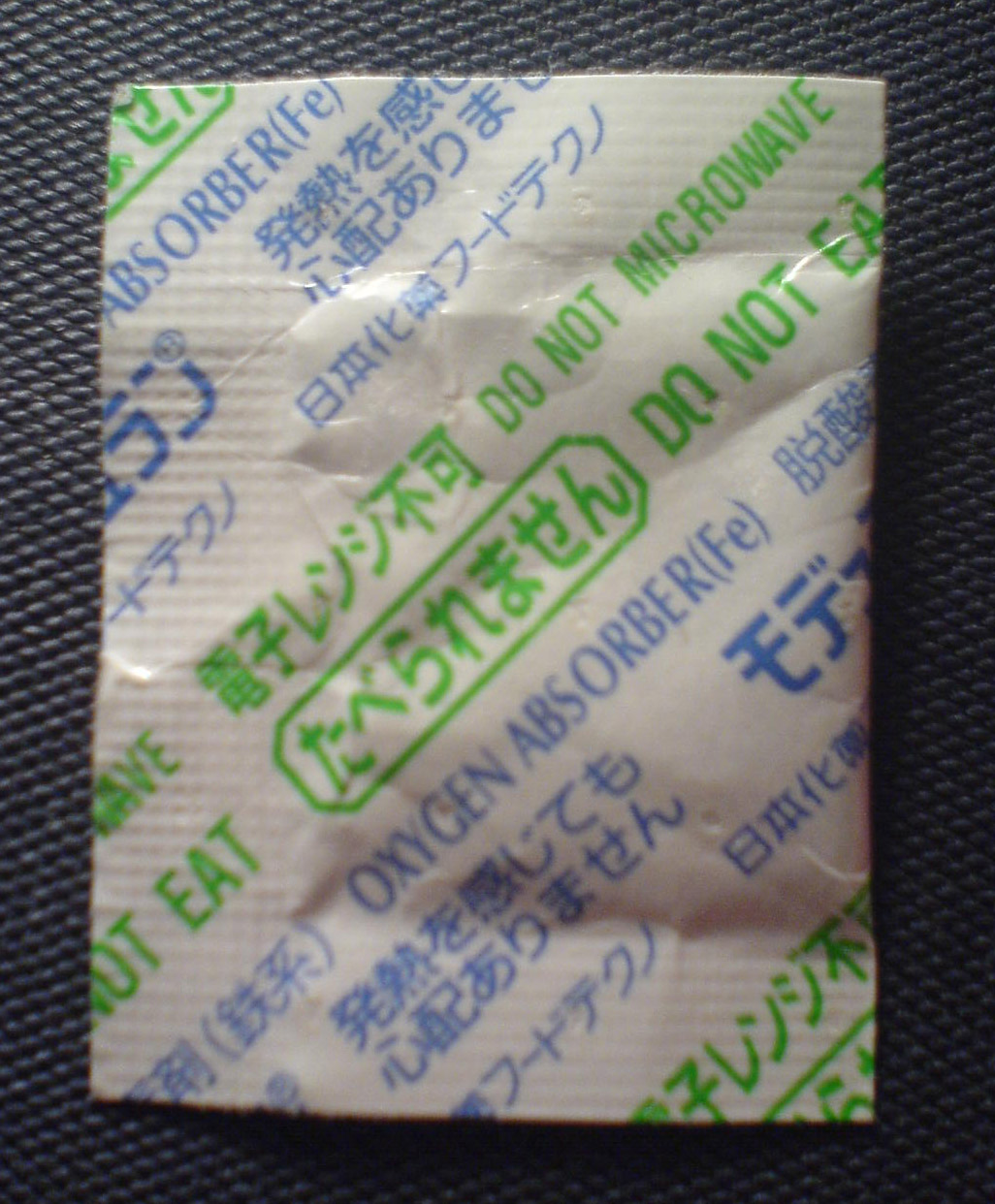
An oxygen absorber

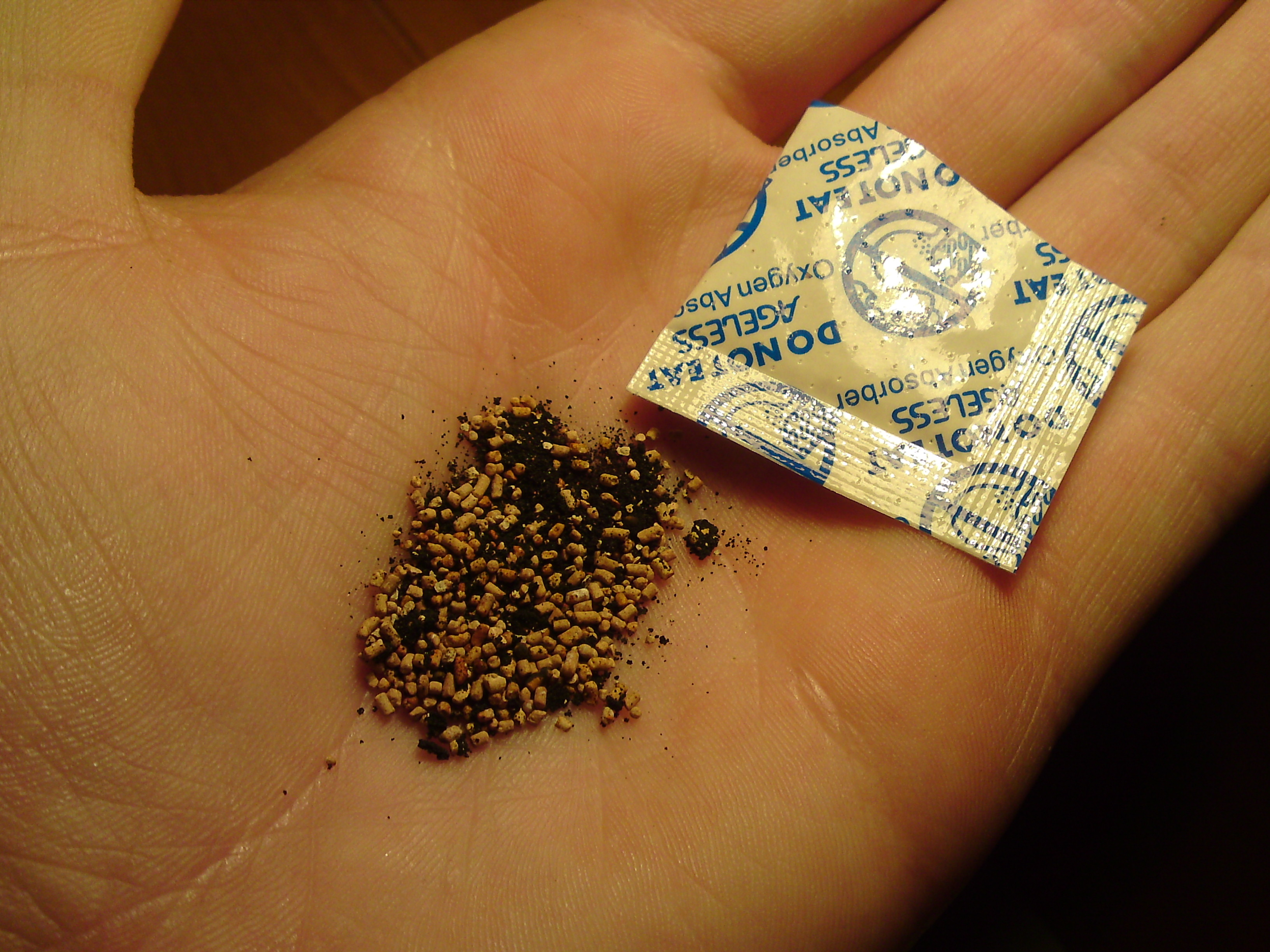
The contents of an oxygen absorber from a packet of beef jerky

Oxygen scavengers or oxygen absorbers are added to enclosed packaging to help remove or decrease the level of oxygen in the package. They are used to help maintain product safety and extend shelf life. There are many types of oxygen absorbers available to cover a wide array of applications.

The components of an oxygen absorber vary according to intended use, the water activity of the product being preserved, and other factors. Often the oxygen absorber or scavenger is enclosed in a porous sachet or packet but it can also be part of packaging films and structures. Others are part of a polymer structure.

Oxygen absorbing chemicals are also commonly added to boiler feedwater used in boiler systems, to reduce corrosion of components within the system.

== Mechanism ==
The first patent for an oxygen scavenger used an alkaline solution of pyrogallic acid in an air-tight vessel.

Modern scavenger sachets use a mixture of iron powder and sodium chloride. Often activated carbon is also included as it adsorbs some other gases and many organic molecules, further preserving products and removing odors.

When an oxygen absorber is removed from its protective packaging, the moisture in the surrounding atmosphere begins to permeate into the iron particles inside of the absorber sachet. Moisture activates the iron, and it oxidizes to form iron oxide. Typically, there is required to be at least 65% relative humidity in the surrounding atmosphere before the rusting process can begin. To assist in the process of oxidation, sodium chloride is added to the mixture, acting as a catalyst or activator, causing the iron powder to be able to oxidize even with relatively low humidity. As oxygen is consumed to form iron oxide the level of oxygen in the surrounding atmosphere is reduced. Absorber technology of this type may reduce the oxygen level in the surrounding atmosphere to below 0.01%. Complete oxidation of 1 g of iron can remove 300 cm^{3} of oxygen in standard conditions. Though other technologies can remove more, iron is the most useful as it does not cause odor like sulfur compounds or passivate like aluminium compounds. Many other alternatives are not food safe. The moisture requirement of iron-based scavengers makes them ineffective in moisture sensitive applications.

The performance of oxygen scavengers is affected by ambient temperature and relative humidity. Newer packaging technologies may use oxygen scavenging polymers to prevent accidental ingestion of oxygen scavengers.

=== Non-ferrous oxygen scavengers ===
While most standard oxygen scavengers contain ferrous carbonate and a metal halide catalyst, there are several non-ferrous variants, such as ascorbate with sodium hydrogen carbonate, among others available.

Typical reasons to use a non-ferrous variant would include the packaging of products intended for international shipping where metal detection would pose a problem; a desire to reduce the odor associated with ferrous carbonate; or dietary products where contact with iron should be avoided.

Ascorbic acid is often used to scavenge oxygen for generation of anaerobic environments for microbiology.

== Benefits of oxygen scavengers ==
- Helps retain fresh-roasted flavor of coffee and nuts
- Prevents oxidation of spice oleoresins present in spices themselves and in seasoned foods
- Prevents oxidation of vitamins A, C and E
- Extends life of pharmaceuticals
- Inhibits mold in natural cheeses and other fermented dairy products
- Delays non-enzymatic browning of fruits and some vegetables
- Inhibits oxidation and condensation of red pigment of most berries and sauces
- Oxygen deprivation contributes to a pest-free environment in museums

Oxygen scavenging technology can quickly reduce oxygen levels in sealed containers to below 0.01%.

== Typical uses ==
- Pharmaceuticals and vitamins
- Medical diagnostic kits and devices
- Potassium metabisulfite is often used in the wine industry to both scavenge oxygen and provide a layer of gas that separates wine from oxygen.
- Foods prone to rancidification, including:
  - Nuts and snacks
  - Whole fat dry foods
  - Processed, smoked and cured meats (including jerky and dried meat nuggets)
  - Cheeses and dairy products
  - Spices and seasonings
  - Flour and grain items
- Other foods, including
  - Fresh and precooked pasta and noodles
  - Birdseed and pet food
  - Breads, cookies, cakes, pastries
  - Candies and confectioneries
  - Coffee and tea
  - Dried fruits and vegetables
- Artwork preservation
- Preserving solderability of electronic parts

== Sachets ==
Plastic sachets offer greater protection than paper as they are not prone to disintegrating in products with high fat contents.

== See also ==
- Active packaging
- Desiccant
- Oxygen transmission rate
- Scavenger (chemistry)
