= Bar (food) =

Processed food formed into a bar shape

A bar, also called a snack bar or a food bar, is a food made of processed ingredients formed into the shape of a bar. Bars typically have a long shelf life and contain high energy ingredients. There are several popular types of bar, including candy bars, protein bars, energy bars, granola bars and fruit bars.

They are one of the most popular forms of snack food, with diversification across different segments of both convenience and health foods. Typical ingredients in a bar are cereal grain, dehydrated fruits or vegetables, seeds, chocolate and dairy. The introduction of the cold chain has allowed for similar foods to emerge in the frozen food segment, such as ice cream bars.

== Historical precedents ==
High quality, portable, dense energy foods have long been a part of food preservation and long-distance travel. In indigenous North America, Pemmican provided long-term storage and preservation of food in a high density patty. In Europe, classical Greek soldiers made dishes like Pastelli, a high density honey and sesame seed bar that can transport and endure long distances.

In India, Chikki is a dessert dish that concentrates sugar and nuts. In Aztec food traditions, Amaranth seed is combined with honey to create seed cakes, which are served in modern Mexico as alegría.

== Types of bar ==
The majority of food bars are sweet, rather than savory. Different types of bar may be marketed for specific purposes, like replacing breakfast or providing protein, or may be marketed to specific demographics like women. Some bars are made to adhere to dietary restrictions like the paleolithic diet or the gluten-free diet.

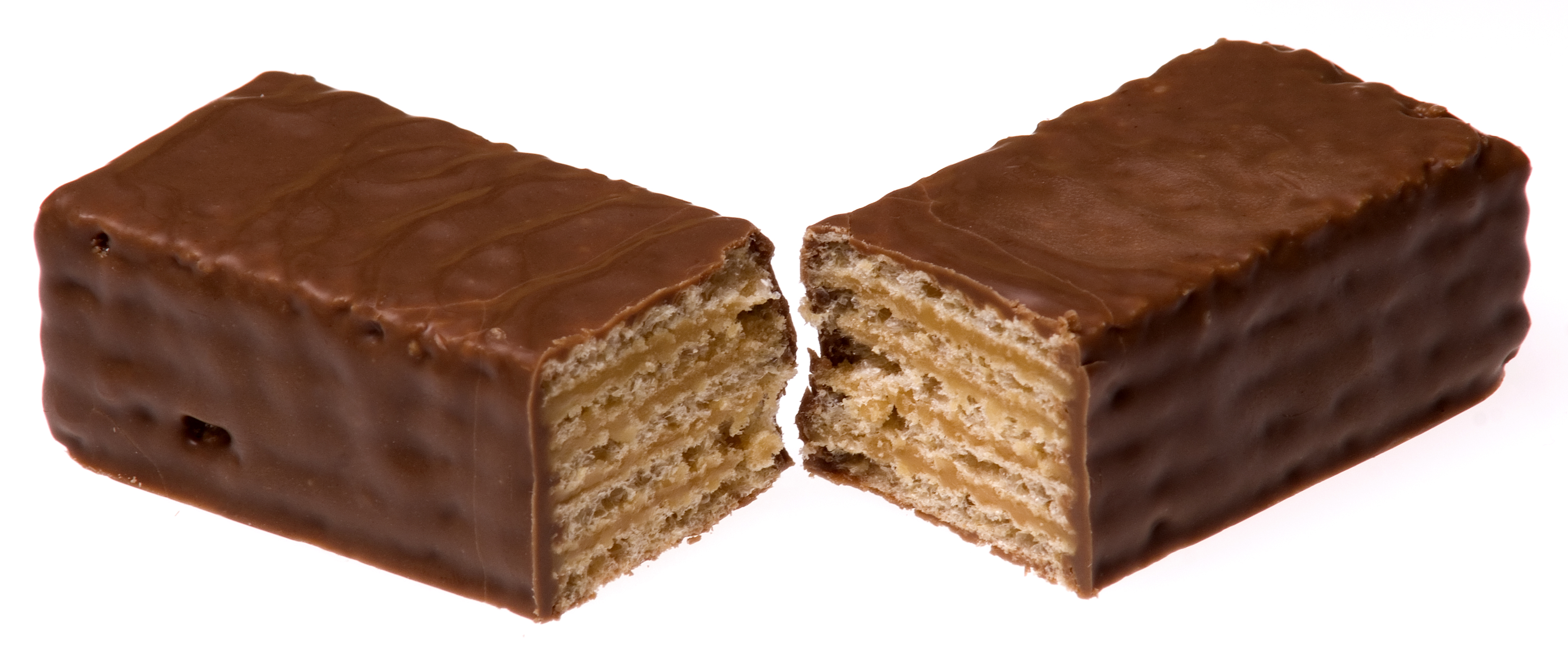
A chocolate bar filled with wafers and caramel.

=== Chocolate or candy bars ===
The first chocolate bars were developed after Joseph Fry, John Cadbury, and Benjamin Cadbury developed a technique for producing solid chocolate. Combination bars, including additional ingredients such as nuts or dried fruit, were developed in the 1910s. One of the most successful was the Clark Bar, introduced in 1917.

Chocolate bars became popular in the 20th-century as palatable and inexpensive high-energy snack items. Some of these bars have become important for different subcultures, such as the widespread use of Kendal Mint Cake in the climbing and mountaineering community in the UK.

=== Dessert bar ===
Dessert bars, or simply bars or squares, are a type of American and Canadian dessert that has the texture of a firm cake or softer than the usual cookie. They are prepared in a pan and then baked in the oven. They are cut into squares or rectangles.

They are staples of bake sales and are often made for birthdays. They are especially popular during the holidays, but many people eat them all year. Many coffee shops and bakeries also offer the treats. Popular flavors include peanut butter bars, lemon bars, chocolate coconut bars, pineapple bars, apple bars, almond bars, toffee bars, chocolate cheesecake bars and the seven-layer bar.

In addition to sugar, eggs, butter, flour and milk, common ingredients are chocolate chips, nuts, raspberry jam, coconut, cocoa powder, graham cracker, pudding, mini-marshmallows and peanut butter. More exotic bars can be made with ingredients including sour cream, rhubarb, pretzels, candies, vanilla, raisins, and pumpkin.

=== Energy bars ===
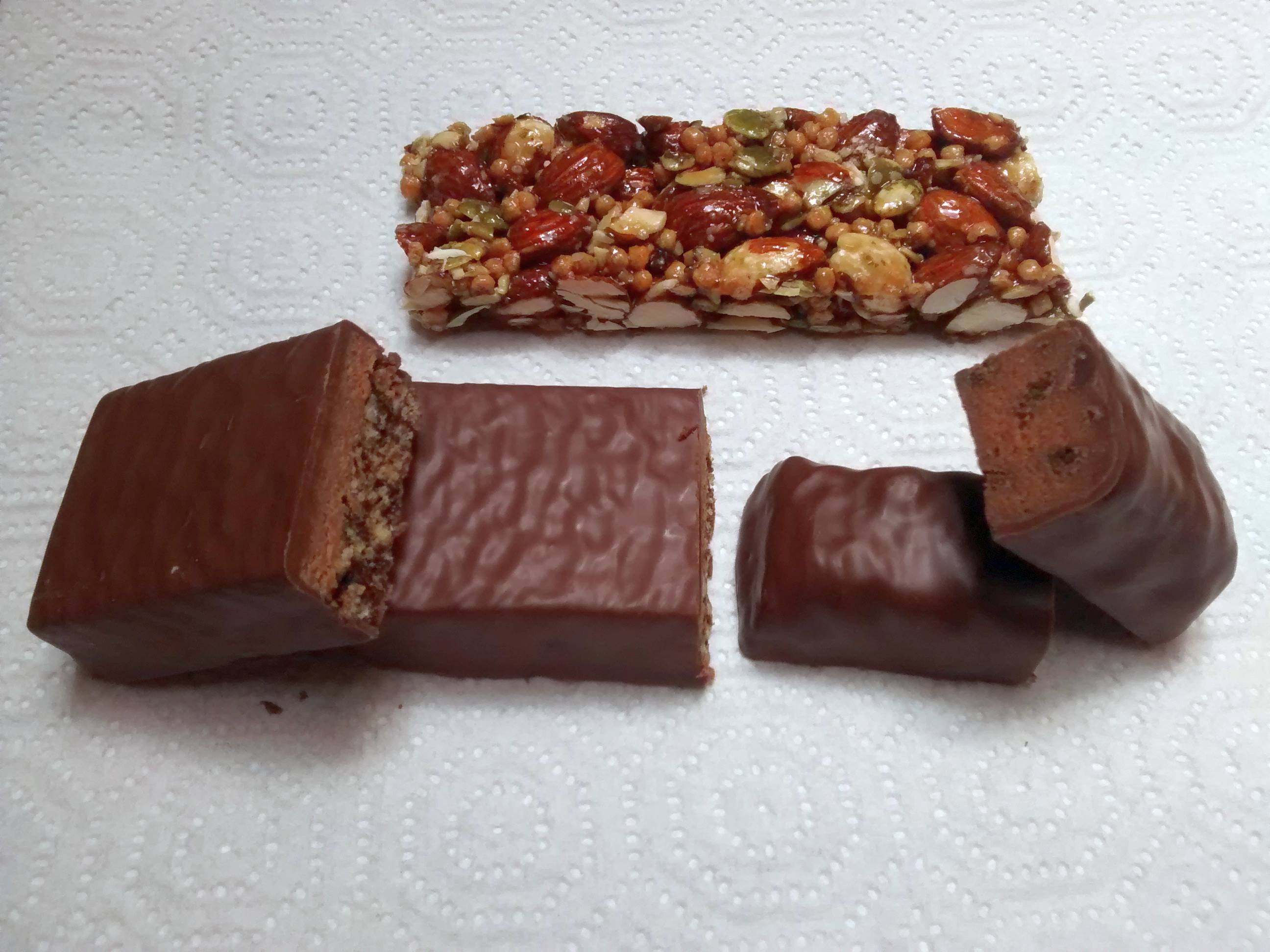
Energy bars vary in size, ingredients, and nutritional benefits.

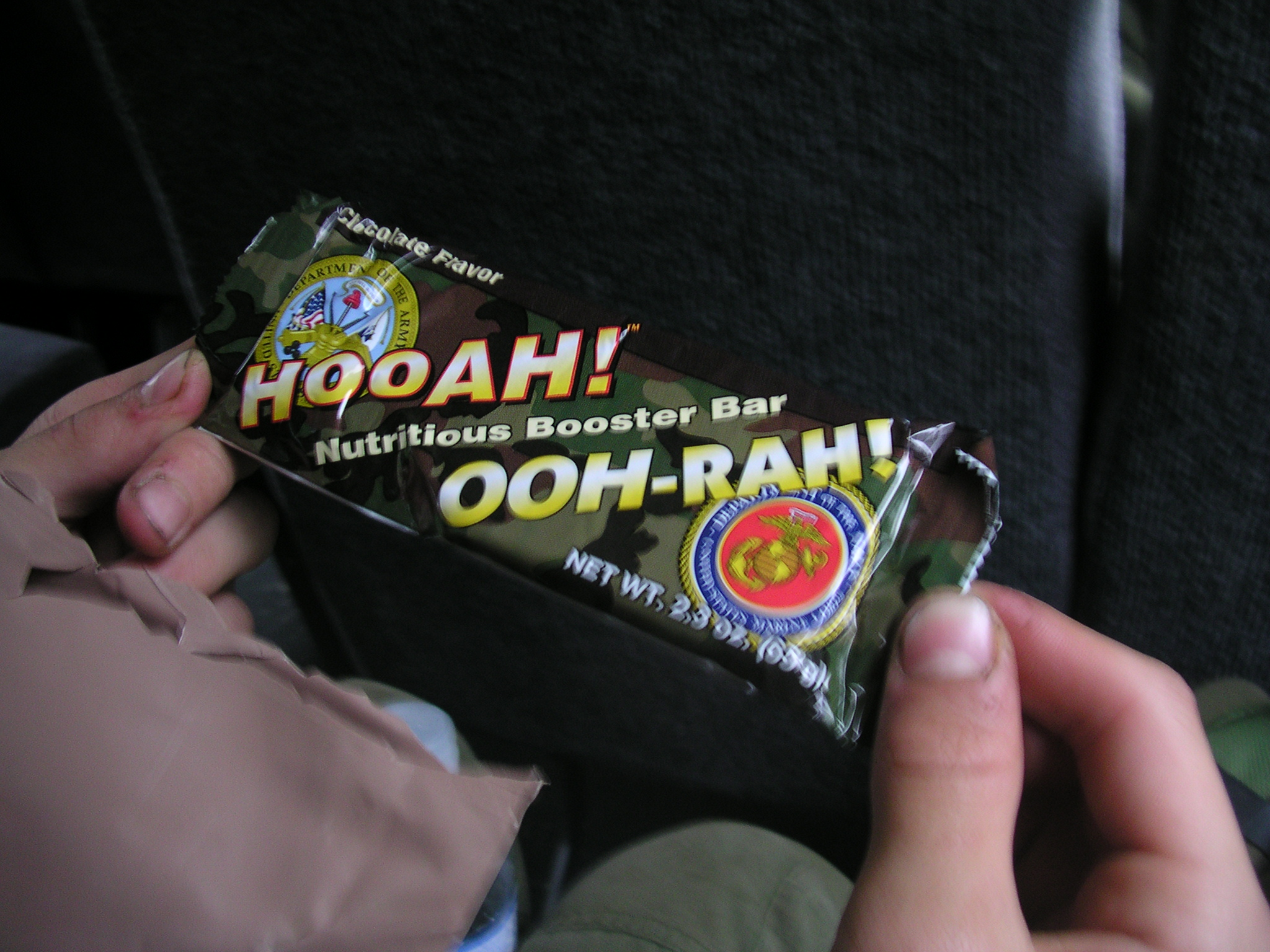
A HOOAH! energy bar provided by the United States Army in its MREs

Energy bars are supplemental snack bars containing cereals, micronutrients, and flavor ingredients intended to supply quick food energy. Because most energy bars contain added protein, carbohydrates, dietary fiber, and other nutrients, they may be marketed as functional foods. Manufacturing of energy bars may supply nutrients in sufficient quantity to be used as meal replacements.

=== Food ration bars ===
Food ration bars are commonly produced as field rations for armed services. Ration bars are more convenient and more nutritious than canned food. They vary in type between cereal-type bars and confectionery bars, and may include various freeze-dried and dehydrated ingredients, such as meat, fruits, vegetables, and grain.

=== Fruit bars ===
Fruit bars are made of compressed dried fruit. Common additives include vegetable oil, sweeteners, and binders such as wheat or oat flour.

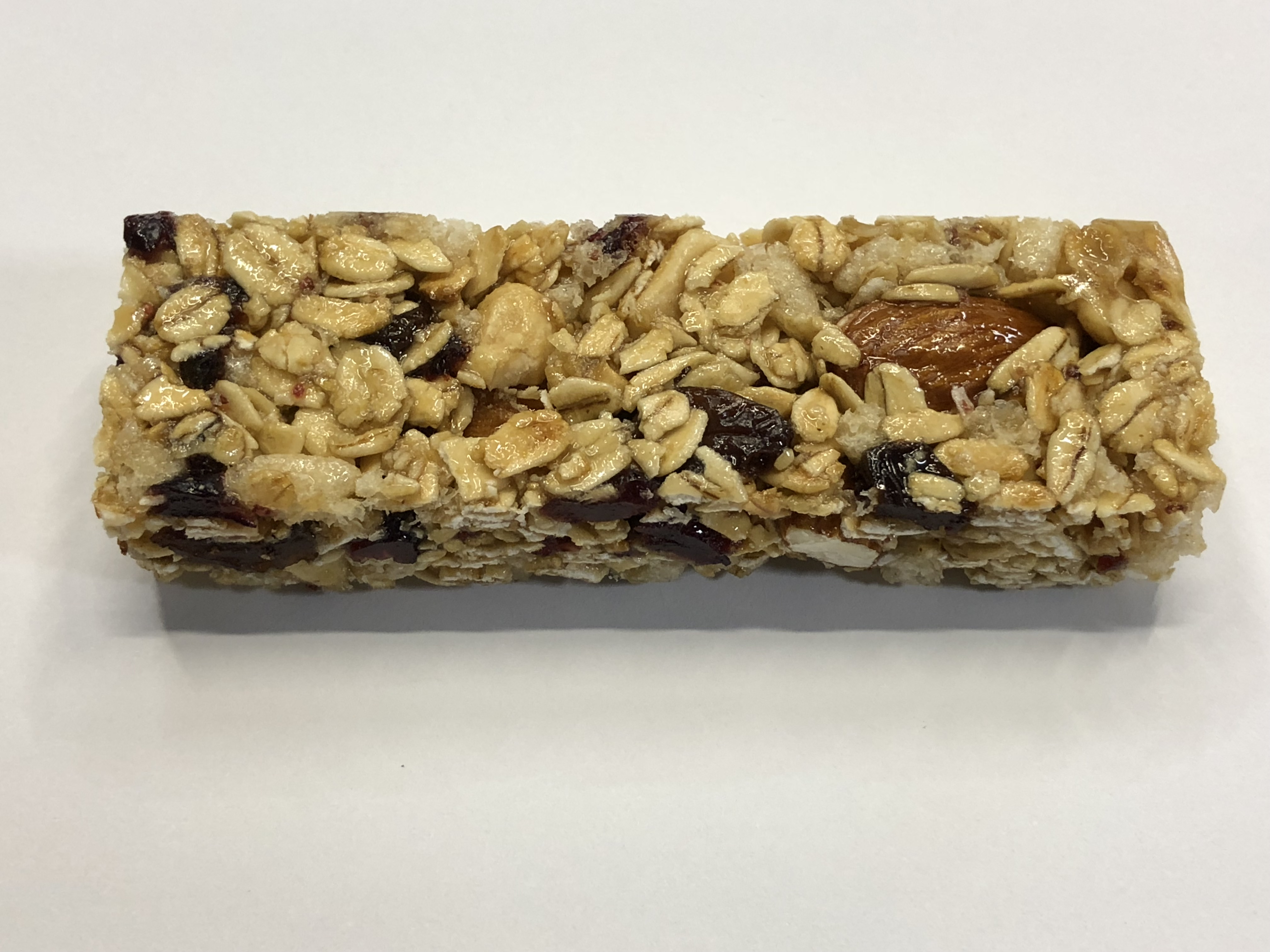
Granola bar with nuts and dried fruit.

=== Granola bars ===
Granola bars are made of granola, muesli or cereal, typically including oat flakes, vegetable fats or oils, and some type of sweetener. Many granola bars contain additional ingredients such as nuts, dried fruits, and seeds. They become popular in the 1960s as part of the counterculture Hippie movement.

=== Ice cream ===
An ice cream bar is a frozen dessert featuring ice cream on a stick. The confection was patented in the US in the 1920s, with one invalidated in 1928.

=== Protein bars ===
Protein bars are commonly consumed by athletes due to their nutritional density and high protein content, which provides energy quickly and assists in growing and repairing connective tissues. Weightlifter Bob Hoffman marketed Hi-Proteen Honey Fudge bars in the 1950s. Space Food Sticks were marketed by Pillsbury in 1969, based on the ration bars provided to astronauts in the American Space Program. They were popularized among amateur fitness enthusiasts after the introduction of the PowerBar in 1986.

The emergence of a distinct "high protein" food culture in the late 20th and early 21st century, has led to a widespread marketing and development of low calory high-protein bars.

== See also ==
- Dessert bar
- Flapjack (oat bar)

== Bibliography ==
Booth, R. Gordon (2012-12-06). Snack Food. Springer Science & Business Media. ISBN 978-1-4613-1477-6.

Koehler, Franz A. (1958). Special Rations for the Armed Forces. Historical Branch, Office of the Quartermaster General.Goldstein, Darra (2015-04-01). The Oxford Companion to Sugar and Sweets. Oxford University Press. ISBN 978-0-19-931361-7.Morganelli, Adrianna (2006). The Biography of Chocolate. Crabtree Publishing Company. ISBN 978-0-7787-2481-0. Morris, E. R. (1965). Technical Report. U.S. Army Natick Development Center, Food Engineering Laboratory.

QFCI (1951). Activities Report of the Quartermaster Food and Container Institute for the Armed Forces. Quartermaster Food and Container Institute for the Armed Forces (U.S.).

Richardson, Tim (2008-12-05). Sweets: A History of Candy. Bloomsbury Publishing USA. ISBN 978-1-59691-890-0.

Serna-Saldivar, Sergio O. (2022-04-20). Snack Foods: Processing, Innovation, and Nutritional Aspects. CRC Press. ISBN 978-1-000-54335-3.

Smith, Andrew F. (2011-12-02). Fast Food and Junk Food: An Encyclopedia of What We Love to Eat [2 volumes]. Bloomsbury Publishing USA. ISBN 978-0-313-39394-5.
