= Nutrition bar =

Nutrition bar may refer to:

- Cereal bar (disambiguation)
- Energy bar
- Protein bar
