= CalorieMate =

Japanese line of nutritional energy foods

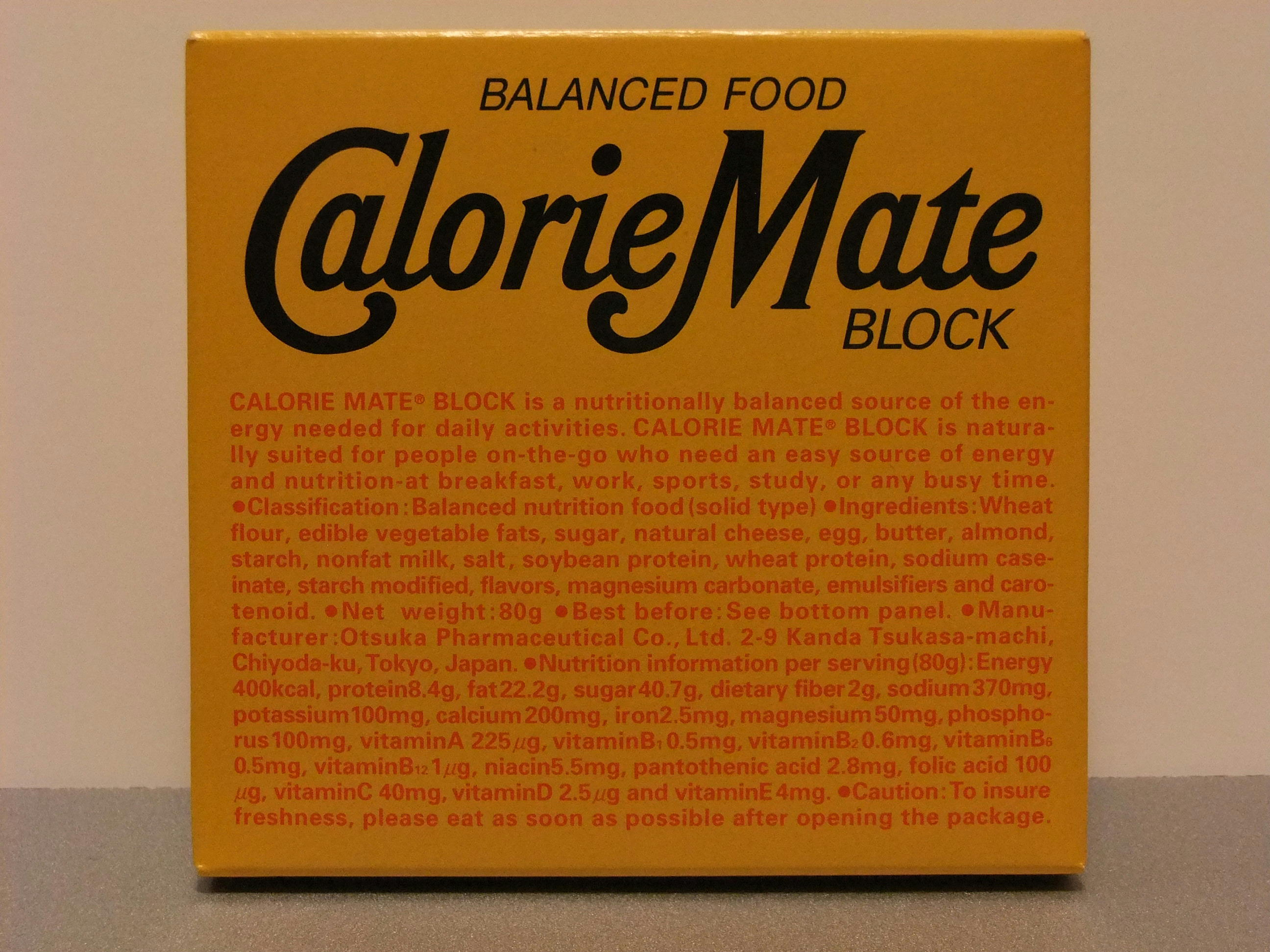
- Product type: Energy bar
- Produced by: Otsuka Pharmaceutical Co.
- Country: Japan
- Introduced: 1983
- Related brands: Nutritional energy food meal replacements
- Markets: Japan
- Tagline: "Balanced Food" "Balanced Nutritional Food"
- Website: Official CalorieMate website

CalorieMate (カロリーメイト karorīmeito) is a brand of nutritional energy bar and energy gel foods produced by Otsuka Pharmaceutical Co. in Japan. It was first released in 1983 debuting with a cheese-flavored block. CalorieMate comes in several forms: CalorieMate Block resembles a bar-shaped cookie (somewhat like a shortbread), sold in packs of either two or four; CalorieMate Jelly is a gelatin sold in a pouch with a spout; and CalorieMate Can is a canned drink.

== Flavors ==
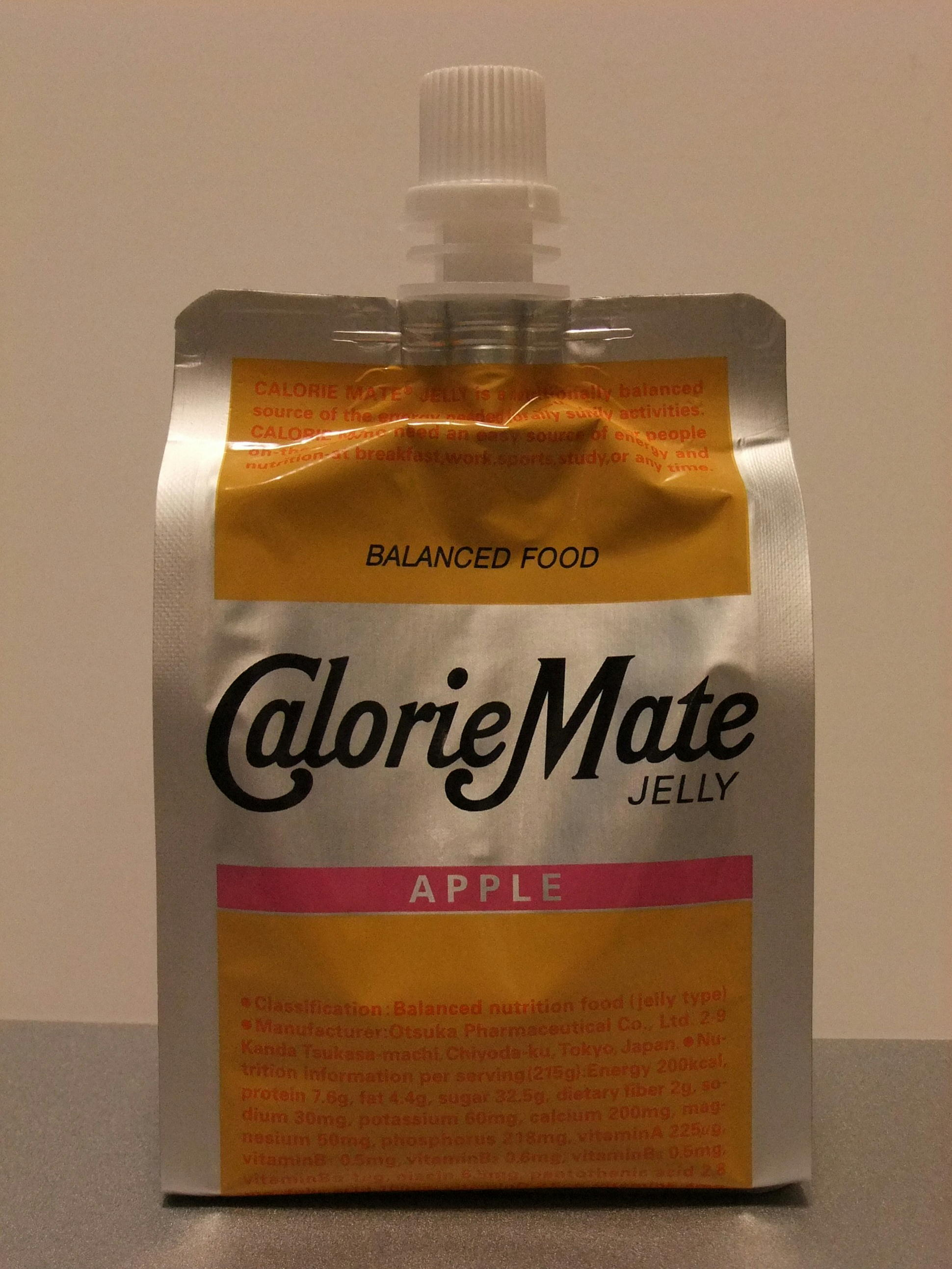
CalorieMate Jelly, Apple

=== Block ===
- Cheese (Black Label) (1983)
- Fruit (Green Label) (1984)
- Chocolate (Red Label) (1993)
- Maple (Pink Label) (2009)
- Vanilla (Light Blue Label) (2022)

=== Jelly ===
- Apple (Pink Label)
- Fruity Milk (Blue Label)
- Lime & Grapefruit (Green Label)
- 100kcal (Black Label)

=== Can ===
- Corn Soup
- Café au lait (Red Label)
- Coffee
- Cocoa
- Fruit Mix (Green Label)
- Yogurt (Blue Label)

== Former Flavors ==
=== Block ===
- Vegetable (2000–2007)
- Potato (2007–2014)
- Plain (White Label) (2014–2022)

== In popular culture ==
During the early 2000s, CalorieMate released a series of TV commercials starring Kiefer Sutherland as a parody of his Jack Bauer character from 24.

CalorieMate is featured as a consumable item in Metal Gear Solid 3: Snake Eater and all subsequent remakes and remasters such as the 3DS Port and Metal Gear Solid Delta: Snake Eater.

CalorieMate is eaten by Hirotaka Nifuji in the anime adaptation of Wotakoi: Love Is Hard for Otaku, as well as by bassist Umiri Yahata in BanG Dream! Ave Mujica.

CalorieMate appears in a scene in Drifting Home (a 2022 film). It is part of an assortment of food acquired by one of the characters in an emergency food kit.

CalorieMate appears as 'KoCalorie' in the second volume of Blue Period (manga). It is used by a couple of the characters as a way to stay sustained during the stress of exams.

== See also ==
- List of food companies
