= Energy gel =

Carbohydrate gel

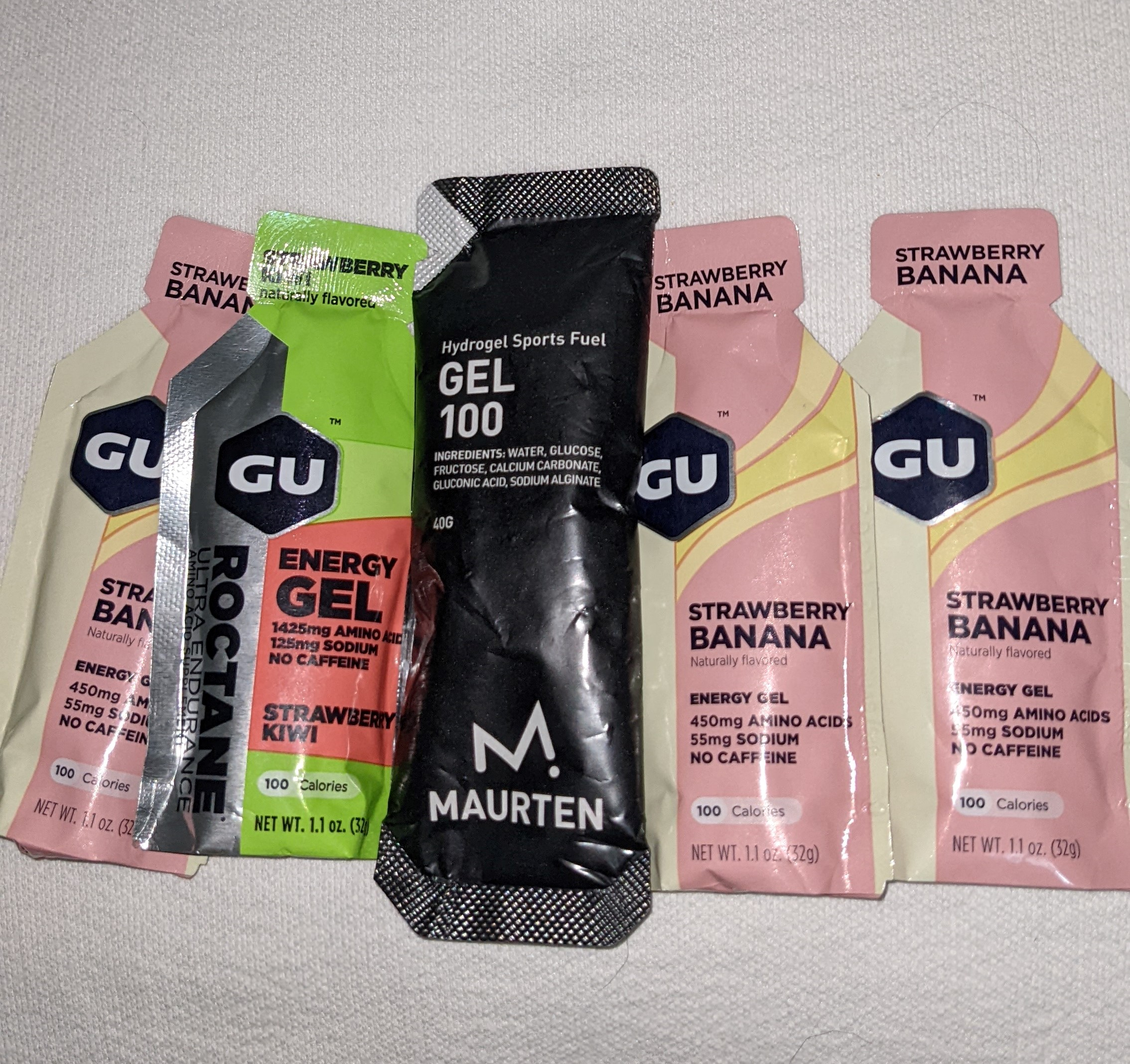
Energy gels

Energy gels are edible carbohydrate gels that provide energy for exercise and promote recovery, commonly used in endurance events such as running, cycling, and triathlons. Energy gels are also referred to as endurance gels, sports gels, nutritional gels, and carbohydrate gels.

Energy gels are packaged in small, single-serve plastic packets. Each packet has a strip with a small notch at the top that can be peeled off to reveal an opening through which the gel can be consumed. One-handed operation is often adopted by users to facilitate continuous exercise performance.

== Packaging and ingredients ==
The size content of energy gels is commonly 1.2 oz (32g), with a range from 1 oz to 1.5 oz packets. The portable packaging is designed to facilitate uninterrupted training or performance conditions. Common ingredients include water, maltodextrin, fructose, and various micronutrients, preservatives, and flavor compounds or caffeine.

== History ==
Sports energy gels emerged in the United Kingdom in 1986 as a "convenient, prewrapped, portable" way to deliver carbohydrates during endurance events. Gels have a gooey texture and are sometimes referred to as "goo" generically. The gel Leppin Squeezy was distributed at the Hawaii Ironman Triathlon in 1988. Once considered a "cult product in clear packaging", energy gel products are now marketed in fancy packaging and come in a variety of flavors. The energy gel market grew during the 1990s, as professional athletes began endorsing products. Manufacturers generally encourage the consumption of multiple packets, with water, when participating in endurance events.

== Use ==
Energy gels are promoted to individuals seeking a boost from caffeine and carbohydrates during exercise performance. The recommended use of an energy gel is 15 minutes before starting and 30–45 minutes after starting the endurance exercise.

== Taste ==
Energy gels have varied taste by addition of flavor ingredients added during manufacturing, such as menthol and chai latte.

== See also ==
- Clif Bar
- PowerBar
- Energy bar
- Food ration bar
- Soldier Fuel
- Sports drink
