= Heyday Canning =

California based canning company

Heyday Canning Company is a California-based startup selling canned beans and soups which launched in 2022.

The brand was founded by Jaime Tulley and Kat Kavner who wanted to "reimagine canned foods" during the COVID-19 shutdowns. The two worked with a nearby university which had a canning operation to find vegetarian combinations of beans and sauces which could work alone or with rice or other grains. Kavner had previously worked at Sweet Earth Foods (now owned by Nestlé) and Clif Bar; Tulley met Kavner at Sweet Earth. Kavner, who was a brand strategist for Clif, describes herself as a "big bean fan" and enjoyed the challenge of doing something new with beans and distributing the product in something more able to be recycled.

Heyday went viral on TikTok in late 2023 when they created a pop-up event selling their products and other branded merchandise, but would only accept bean food shelf donations, not actual money. Kavner's brother Reed Kavner came up with the "buzzy pop-up" idea. The brand was originally sold in Sprouts Farmers Market, and is currently sold nationwide in Whole Foods and Target stores. The brand continues to create pop-up events including one giving out free bean-themed tattoos in summer 2026.
