= Luna bar =

Brand of nutrition bars

LUNA
- Founded: 1999; 27 years ago
- Products: Energy bars
- Parent: Mondelez International
- Website: www.clifbar.com/luna

LUNA Bars is a brand of nutrition bars created by Clif Bar & Company in 1999. The initial product introduced was one of the first energy bars primarily targeted at women. Over time, the brand has expanded to encompass a range of drinks, protein bars, and the philanthropic initiative known as LUNAFEST, a women's film festival.

== History ==
LUNA Bars were developed in 1999 by a female employee of Clif Bar & Company. These bars were designed to contain under 200 calories, with a focus on appealing to a female audience.

On June 20, 2022, Mondelēz International, Inc. announced an agreement to acquire Clif Bar & Company for $2.9 billion.

== Community Outreach ==
LUNA Bars claims that it contributes 1% of its product sales revenue to various charitable organizations that support environmental, social, and cultural causes. The primary beneficiary is The Breast Cancer Fund.

=== LUNAFEST ===
In 2000, LUNA introduced LUNAFEST, a philanthropic traveling film festival featuring films created and directed by women. Interested individuals and organizations could be able to register to host the festival in their city, with LUNA providing the films and materials which would be needed. Through the events, hosting organizations would raise funds for The Breast Cancer Fund and other chosen causes, with 15% of LUNAFEST proceeds sent to the Breast Cancer Fund and the remaining 85% of funds to a nonprofit organization, which would be chosen by the host. Since 2000, LUNAFEST has raised over $456,000 for The Breast Cancer Fund and $785,000 for other organizations. The LUNAFEST program will be on hiatus for the remainder of 2023 and the full year of 2024.

=== Team LUNA Chix ===
In 2001, Clif Bar co-owners and co-CEOs Gary Erickson and Kit Crawford launched LUNA Pro Team, a women’s professional mountain biking team. In 2002, they expanded the initiative to include Team LUNA Chix, a network of women's teams across the United States that focus on various sports, fitness activities, and raising money for The Breast Cancer Fund. While initially centered only on mountain biking, the team currently encompasses running, triathlon, and cycling. There are more than twenty-six LUNA Chix teams located in over twenty-one cities, with a total of two-hundred sixty members. They were featured in Fitness magazine as one of fifteen organizations promoting Breast Cancer awareness.

== Bar varieties ==
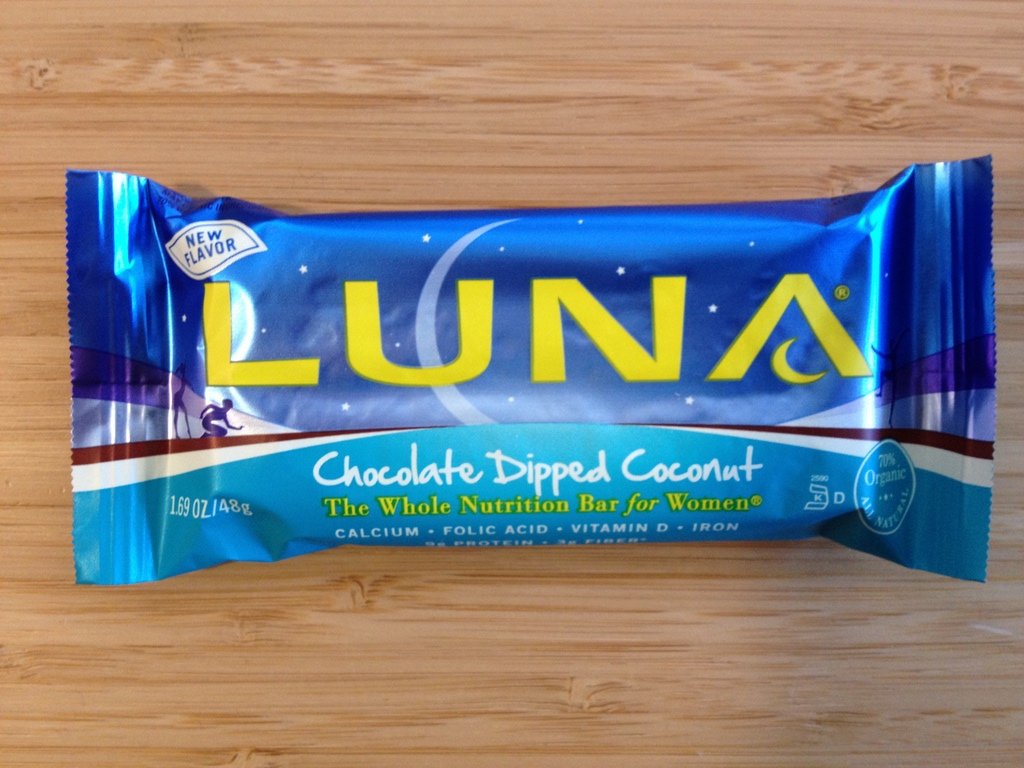
A chocolate-dipped coconut LUNA Bar

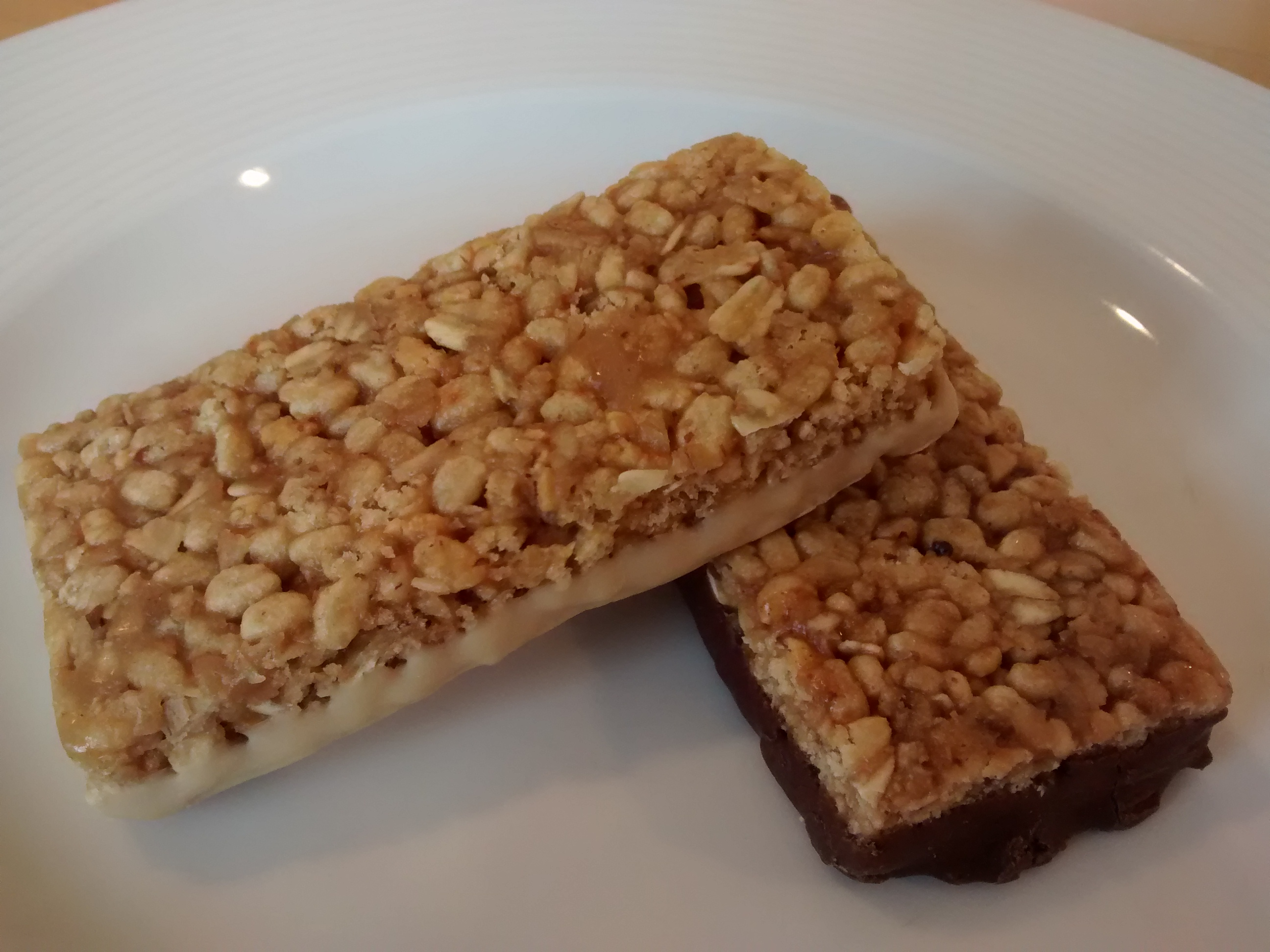
Two LUNA Bars: Lemon Zest (left) and Nutz Over Chocolate (right)

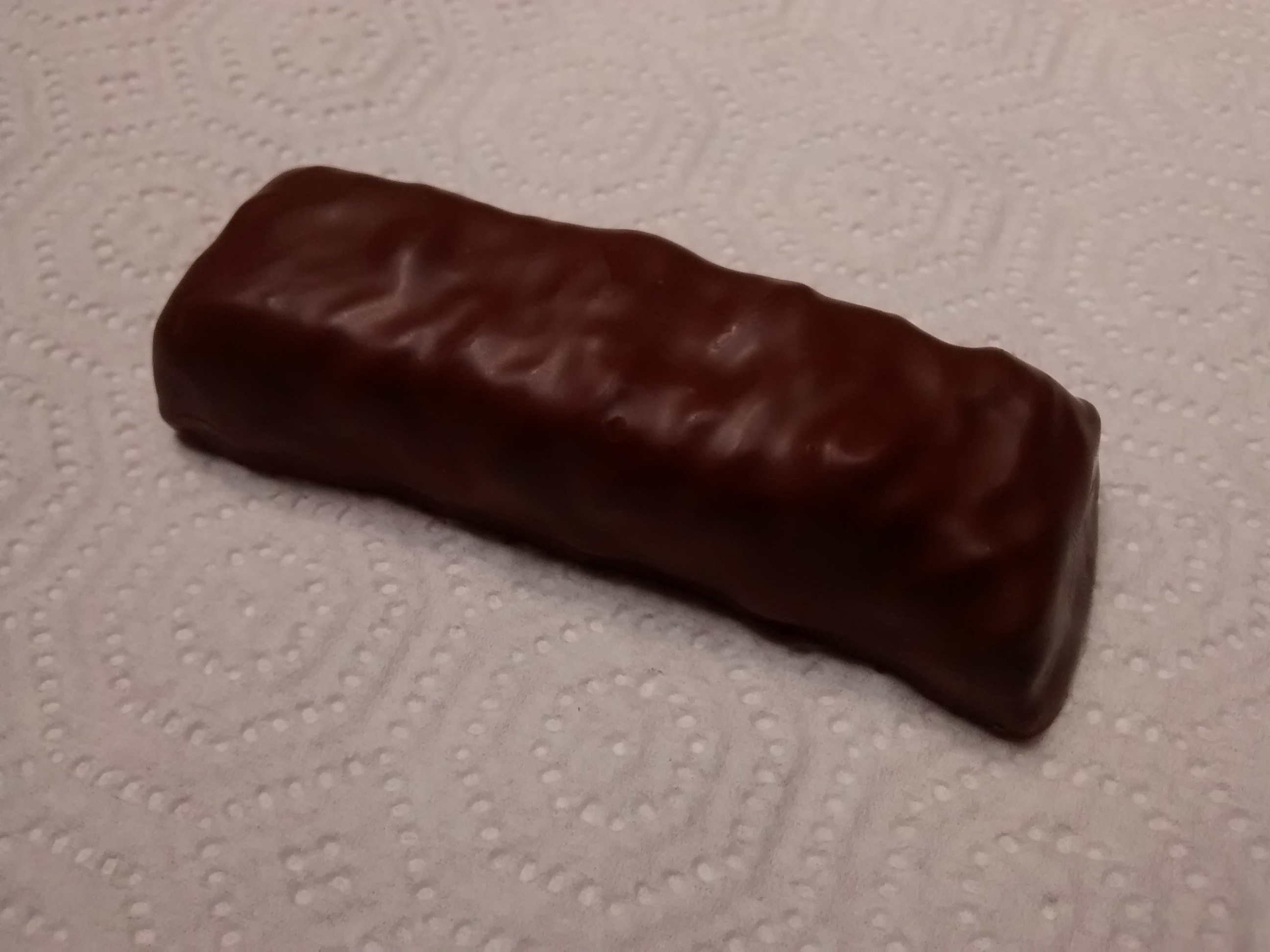
Luna Protein Mint Chocolate Chip bar

Incomplete list of Luna Bar types:

- Blueberry Bliss
- Caramel Nut Brownie
- Carrot Cake
- Chocolate Chunk
- Chocolate Cupcake
- Chocolate Dipped Coconut
- Chocolate Peppermint Stick
- Chocolate Raspberry
- Cookie Dough
- Cookies ‘n Cream Delight
- Honey Salted Peanut
- Iced Oatmeal Raisin
- Key Lime Pie
- Lemon Zest
- Luna Fiber Chocolate Raspberry
- Luna Fiber Peanut Butter Strawberry
- Luna Fiber Vanilla Blueberry
- Luna Protein Chocolate
- Luna Protein Chocolate Cherry Almond
- Luna Protein Chocolate Chip Cookie Dough
- Luna Protein Chocolate Coconut Almond
- Luna Protein Chocolate Peanut Butter
- Luna Protein Cookie Dough
- Luna Protein Lemon Vanilla
- Luna Protein Mint Chocolate Chip
- Mash-Ups LemonZest + Blueberry
- Mash-Ups LemonZest + Coconut
- Mash-Ups LemonZest + Raspberry
- Mint Chocolate Chip
- Nutz Over Chocolate
- Peanut Butter Cookie
- Peanut Honey Pretzel
- Salted Caramel Nut (Gluten Free)
- Toasted Nuts 'n Cranberry
- Vanilla Almond
- White Chocolate Macadamia

== See also ==
- List of food companies
