= Clif Bar =

American organic foods and drink company

Clif Bar & Company

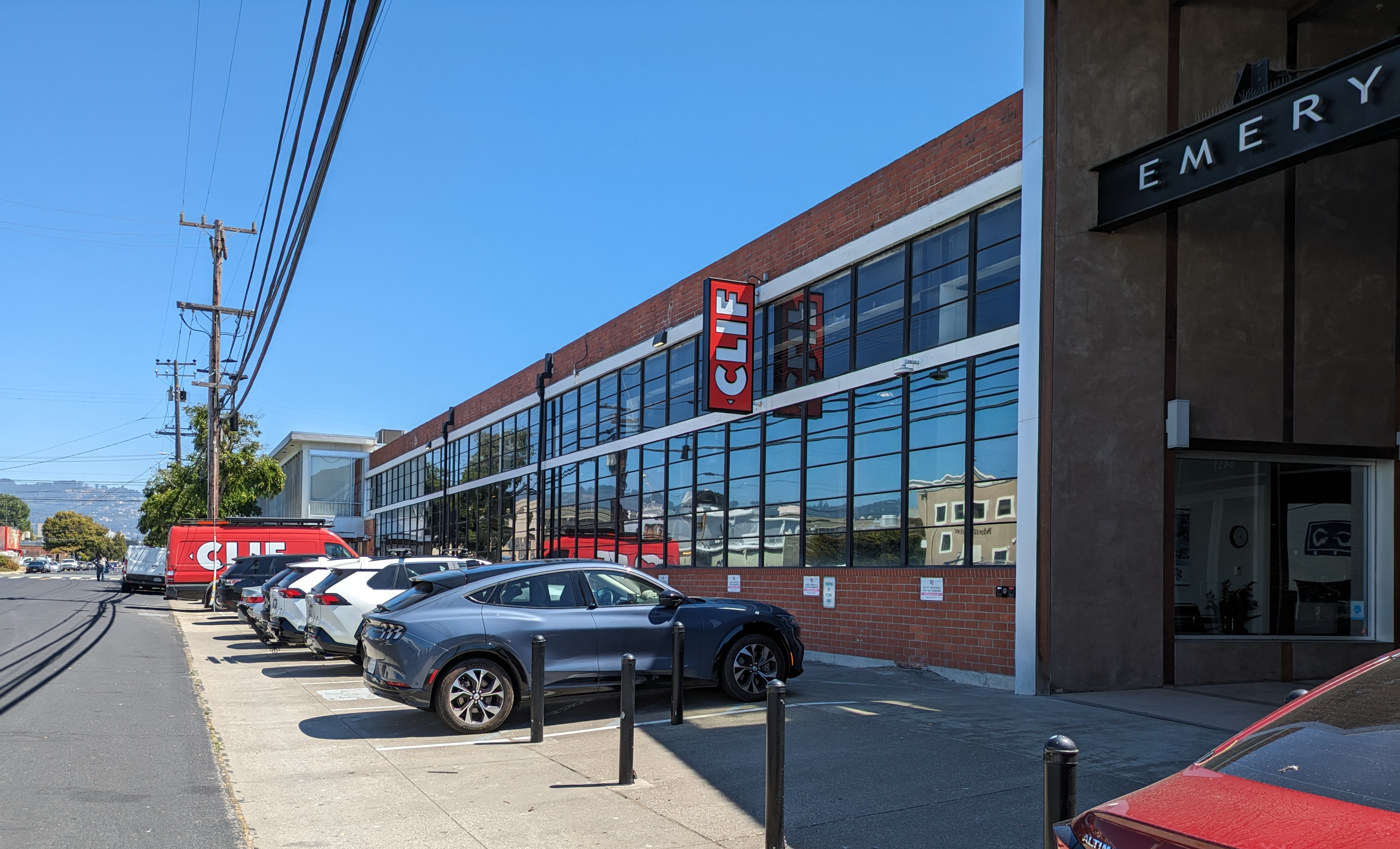
- Headquarters in Emeryville, California, United States
- Type: Subsidiary
- Founded: 1992; 34 years ago
- Headquarters: Emeryville, California, United States
- Key people: Gary Erickson, Kit Crawford (co-owners and co-CEOs)
- Products: Energy bars and snacks
- Parent: Mondelez International
- Website: clifbar.com

Clif Bar & Company is an American producer of energy foods and drinks. The company's flagship product, Clif Bar, was created by Gary Erickson and Lisa Thomas. The company is based in Emeryville, California, and was privately held until 2022 when it was acquired by Mondelez International for $2.9 billion. In April 2013, Kevin Cleary was named CEO, Rich Boragno CFO, and co-owners Erickson and Kit Crawford became co-chief visionary officers. In 2018, Cleary left the company, and Erickson and Crawford became co-CEOs, positions they had held previously. On June 1, 2020 the company named Sally Grimes as its new CEO.

== History ==
A baker and former mountain guide, Erickson had a self-described 'epiphany moment' for his product in 1990 on a day-long, 175-mile bike ride, for which he packed Powerbars, the only energy bars on the market at that time. Two years later, after experimenting in his mother's kitchen, he settled on a recipe for what would become the Clif Bar. Erickson tried several names and formulations—including Forza, Torque, and Gary's Bar—before settling on Clif Bar, named after his father Clifford. The packaging image of a rock climber was first drawn by Doug Gilmour on a napkin over dinner in San Francisco. At a September 1991 bike show, Erickson debuted three flavors: double chocolate, apricot, and date oatmeal.

In Clif Bar's first year, its revenues exceeded $700,000, fueled primarily by strong sales in bike shops and the growth of the health and natural foods movement. Sales doubled each year and, by 1997, revenue surpassed $20 million. In 1997, the company name was changed from Kali's SportNaturals to Clif Bar, Inc. In 2010, the company moved into a new headquarters in the EmeryTech Building in Emeryville, California. Designed by ZGF Architects LLP, the former manufacturing plant earned Leadership in Energy and Environmental Design (LEED) Platinum status. The building was repurposed and sustainably designed with photovoltaic panels, solar thermal panels, reclaimed wood, live plants, and other biophilic features.

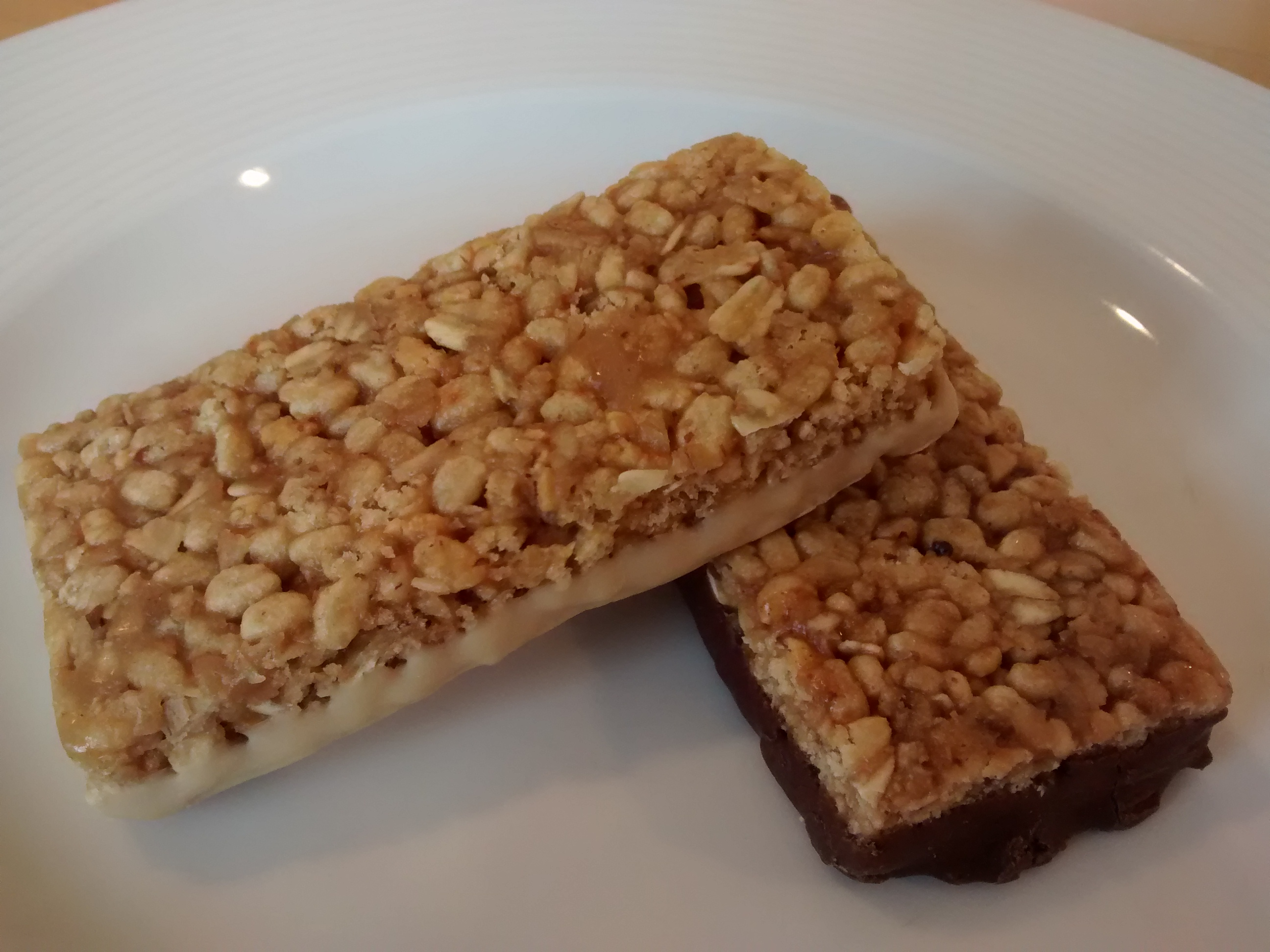
Two LUNA Bars: Lemon Zest (left) and Nutz Over Chocolate (right)

In March 1999, Clif Bar introduced LUNA Bar, specifically marketed towards women. In April 2000 a $120 million offer from Quaker Oats to buy the company was turned down though it resulted in 50% co-owner Lisa Thomas leaving Clif Bar and Erickson buying out her share for $60 million.

Clif Bar & Company was ranked No. 1 in the Forbes "Breakaway Brands" survey, conducted by Landor Associates using Young & Rubicam's Brand Asset Valuator database measuring brand momentum from 2006 to 2009.

In June 2022, it was announced that the company would be bought by Mondelez International for $2.9 billion.

=== Other ventures ===
Erickson and Crawford founded the Clif Bar Family Foundation in 2006. Through 2012 it had committed $1 million to promote organic seed research and conserve crop genetic diversity.

Erickson and Crawford also own the Clif Family Winery & Farm in the Napa Valley, which had its first national release in 2008.

== Products ==
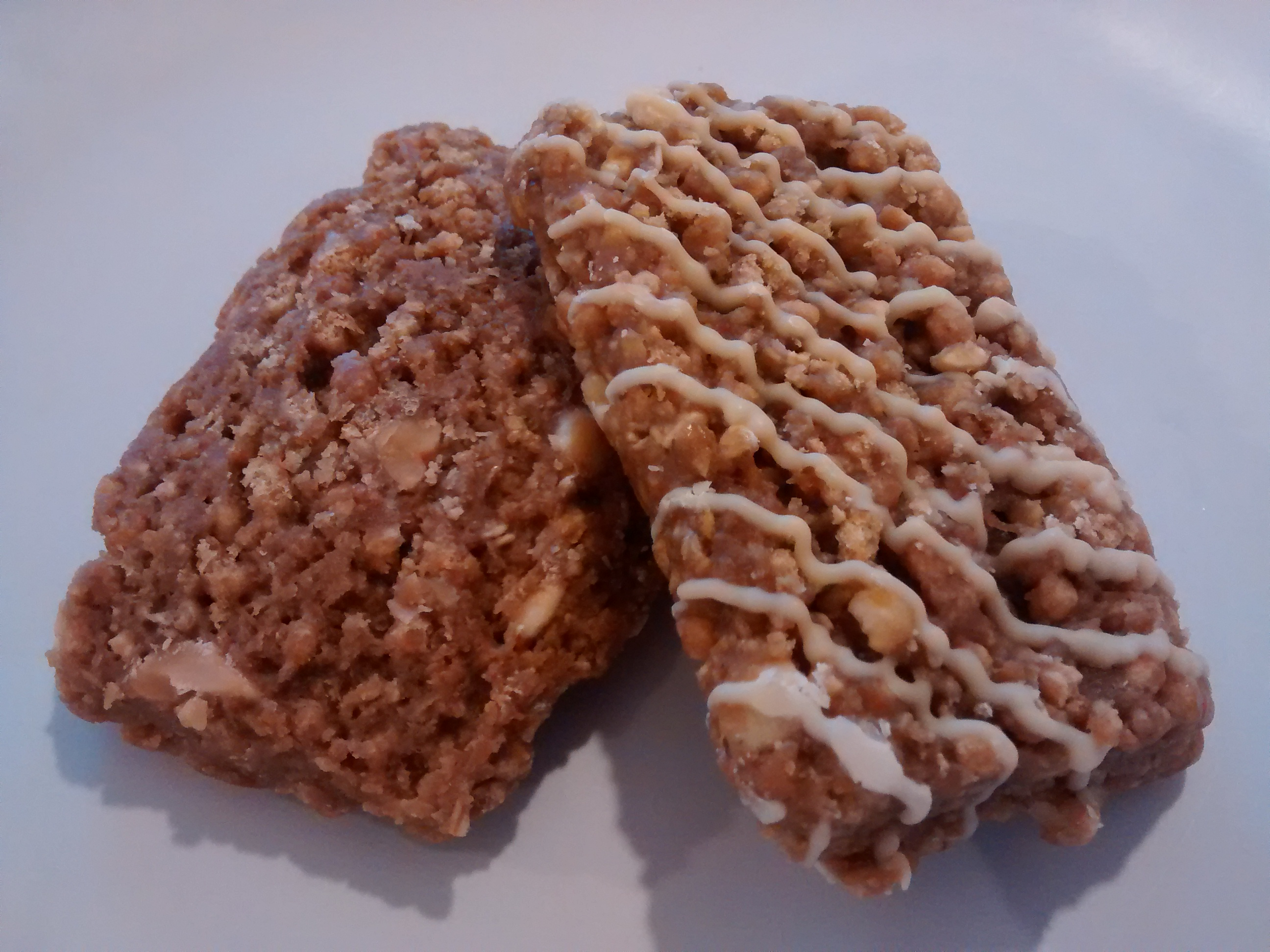
Two Clif Bars

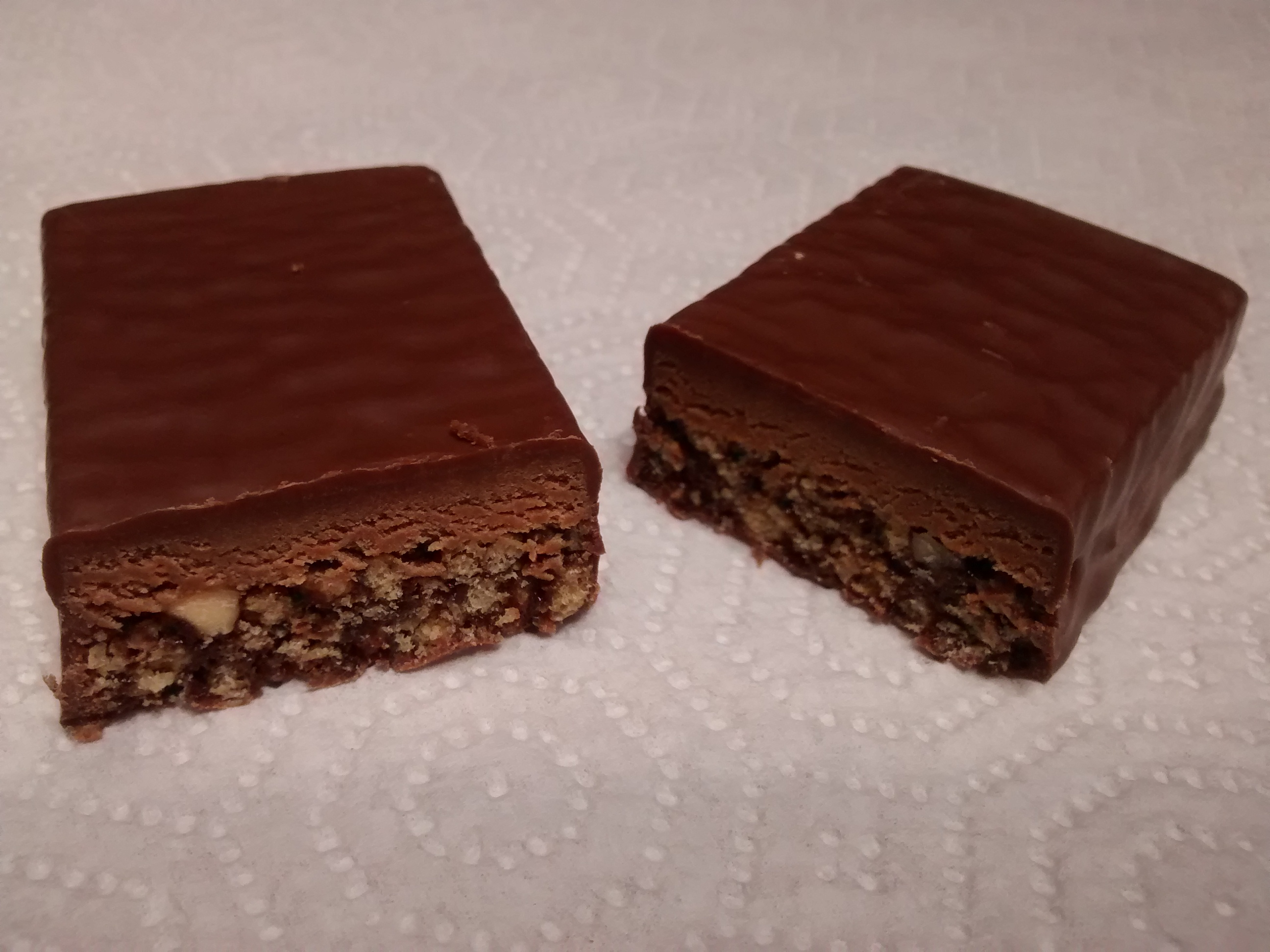
Clif Builder's Bar, a protein bar

In addition to its signature original Clif Bar, the company produces a variety of energy bars tailored to women, children, and other markets, a sports drink, and fruit-based items such as fruit ropes. In 2014, the company unveiled four gel-like squeezable 'energy foods' that were expanded in early 2016 to encompass six flavors. All products use organic ingredients. Seventy percent of the company's purchased ingredients are certified organic.

== Environmental sustainability ==
The Clif Bar company has instituted policies intended to make it more green-friendly. It switched to organic ingredients and eliminated shrink-wrap, saving 90,000 pounds of plastic and $400,000 annually, and invested in wind energy to offset fossil fuel usage.

To help reduce fuel consumption, Clif Bar began giving employees $6,500 in 2007 to switch to bio-diesel or high-mileage hybrid cars. As a bio-diesel incentive program, "Cool Commute" was the first of its type nationwide and drew praise from Al Gore for helping to aid the fight against global warming. In 2008, the company began giving employees up to $500 to purchase a commuter bike, with annual rewards up to $960 for getting to work on foot, bicycle, or public transportation. The company also began offering employees up to $1,000 annually to make eco-improvement to their homes, such as insulation, solar panel installation, and new windows. In April 2009, Clif Bar joined Business for Innovative Climate and Energy Policy also known as BICEP, a coalition of companies including Nike, eBay and The North Face, with the goal of passing progressive climate and energy legislation. In October 2015, Clif Bar along with other members BICEP released a joint letter pledging to accelerate business action on climate change and urging governments to do the same.

In 2012, amid concerns over child labor and possible slavery on West African cocoa farms, Clif Bar was challenged to disclose the source of their cocoa. On March 5, 2012, the company announced that thenceforth "100 percent of cocoa ingredients for CLIF BAR will be sourced from Rainforest Alliance Certified farms."

== Company culture ==
In June 2010, Clif Bar initiated an employee stock ownership program (ESOP), which gave 20 percent ownership of the company to its employees, with Crawford and Erickson retaining the other 80 percent.

Company facilities include an on-site gym, rock climbing wall, two yoga room/dance studios, and massage rooms. There are on-site showers so employees can shower after their workout. Employees also have access to free counseling and life coaching. Employees can bring their dogs to work and get two and a half hours of paid exercise each week with free personal training. Clif Bar & Company was named among Outside magazine's Best Places to Work in 2008, 2009, 2010, 2011, and 2012.

In November 2014 Clif Bar made a decision to limit risky behavior by its sponsored athletes, stating "going forward we will not be sponsoring climbers who are primarily recognized for free-soloing, B.A.S.E. jumping, and highlining. This change in sponsorship approach did not come without great debate." The company reasoned that "[they] no longer feel good about benefitting from the amount of risk certain athletes are taking in areas of the sport where there is no margin for error; where there is no safety net".

In 2018, the company introduced the “Re-Tern” program, in which pre-retiree Clif Bar employees can apply for an internship at the Community Department to be trained in non-profit operations. The goal is to prepare individuals retiring from the company for “a post-Clif Bar place in the world.”

== Community outreach ==
Clif Bar began community outreach in 2001, with the initial aim of donating 2,080 employee volunteer hours to community service. In 2010, Clif employees donated 5,290 hours. In 2008, the "In Good Company" initiative was announced, which organizes employees across several companies to assist in larger development projects, such as in New Orleans, East Oakland, and the Hopi Reservation in Arizona.

== See also ==
- Energy bar
- Lärabar
- Kind (company)
- Nature Valley
- Protein bar
