= Confetti square =

Dessert bar

The confetti square is a dessert bar made with peanut butter, marshmallows and chocolate chips or butterscotch chips. They are eaten in Canada and the United States, particularly the Maritimes.

== Description ==
Confetti squares are prepared by melting butterscotch chips and peanut butter together with margarine, or butter. Once the mixture is removed from heat, multicolored mini marshmallows are stirred in. The mixture is then poured into a baking pan and allowed to cool and harden before being sliced into squares. Once sliced, the color of the marshmallows is visible in the center of the bars.

They may include additional ingredients, such as shredded coconut and walnuts. Some versions substitute chocolate chips instead of butterscotch chips.

== See also ==
- Nanaimo bar
