= Dessert bar =

Type of dessert

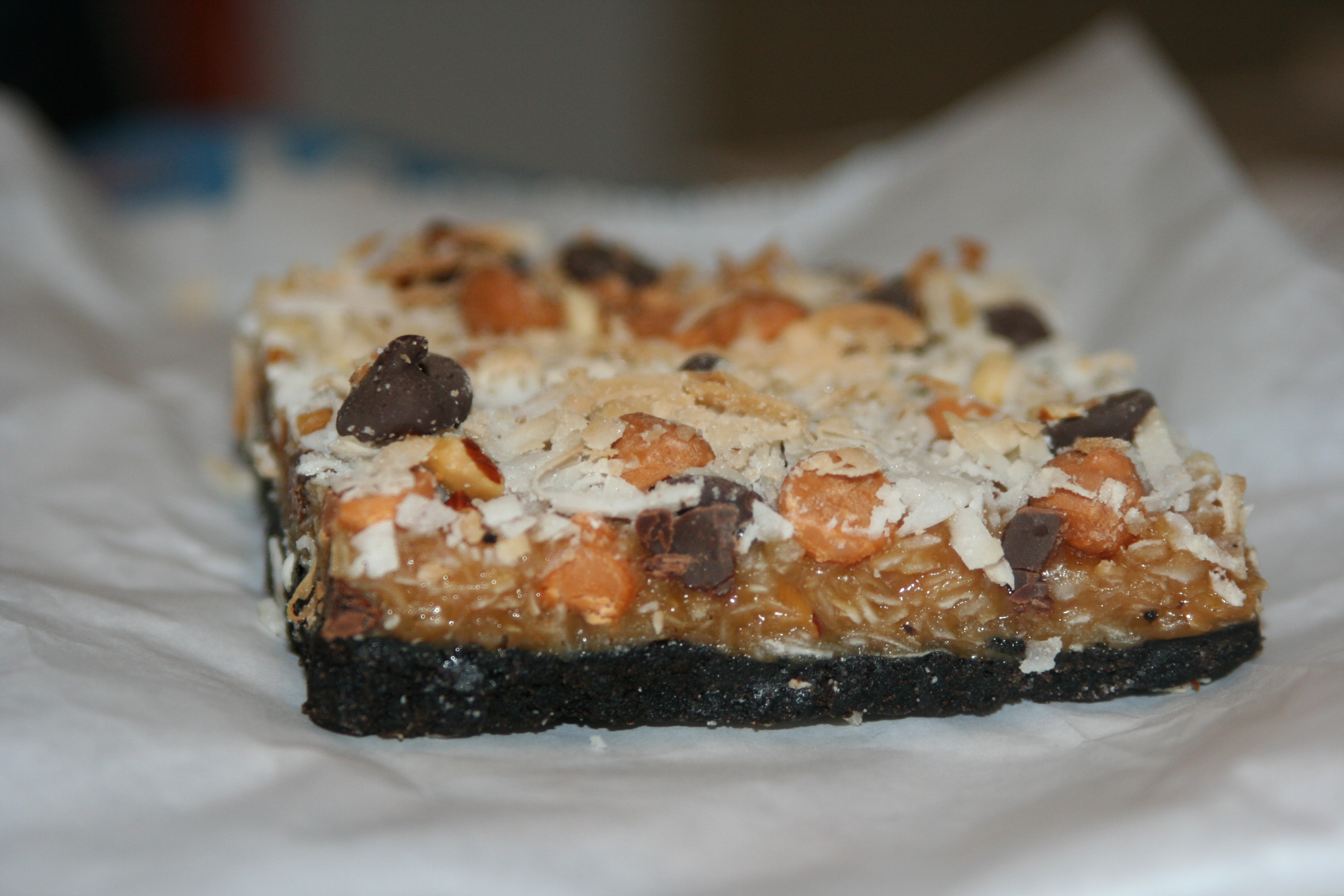
- A bar made of coconut shavings, caramel, chocolate and butterscotch chips, almond pieces, and an Oreo cookie crust
- Alternative names: Bar, square
- Type: Dessert
- Place of origin: United States, Canada
- Region or state: Midwestern United States
- Main ingredients: Sugar, eggs, butter, flour, milk

Dessert bars, or simply bars or squares, are a type of American and Canadian dessert that has the texture of a firm cake or softer than the usual cookie. They are prepared in a pan and then baked in the oven. They are cut into squares or rectangles.

They are staples of bake sales and are often made for birthdays. They are especially popular during the holidays, but many people eat them all year. Many coffee shops and bakeries also offer the treats. Popular flavors include peanut butter bars, lemon bars, chocolate coconut bars, pineapple bars, apple bars, almond bars, toffee bars, chocolate cheesecake bars and the seven-layer bar.

In addition to sugar, eggs, butter, flour and milk, common ingredients are chocolate chips, nuts, raspberry jam, coconut, cocoa powder, graham cracker, pudding, mini-marshmallows and peanut butter. More exotic bars can be made with ingredients including sour cream, rhubarb, pretzels, candies, vanilla, raisins, and pumpkin.

== Regional variants ==
The Nanaimo bar is a bar dessert that requires no baking and is named after the city of Nanaimo, British Columbia.

The seven-layer bar variant, which is also called the "magic bar", "Hello Dolly bar", or "coconut dream bar", generally contains a graham cracker base, butter, condensed milk, coconut flakes, chocolate chips, butterscotch chips, and chopped nuts. The recipe dates back at least to the mid-1960s, when early published recipes appear; the name "Hello Dolly" appears to refer to the musical Hello Dolly, though the reason for the connection is unclear.

In parts of Canada, dessert bars are called "dainties" and typically include unique staples of Canadian cuisine such as Nanaimo bars, butter tarts, and confetti squares.

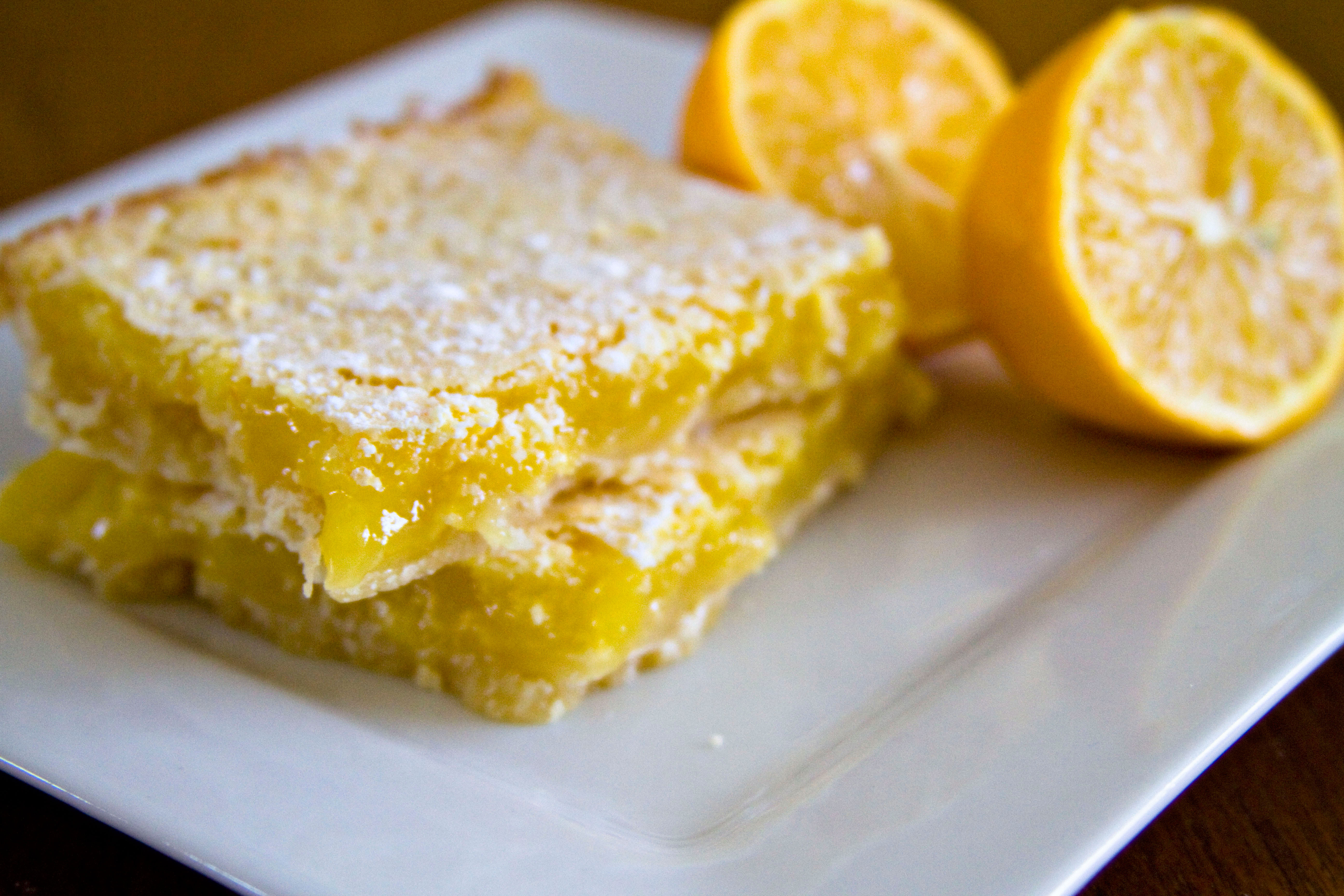
Lemon squares

Popular belief holds that lemon squares originated in Trinidad and Tobago.

== Commercial variants ==
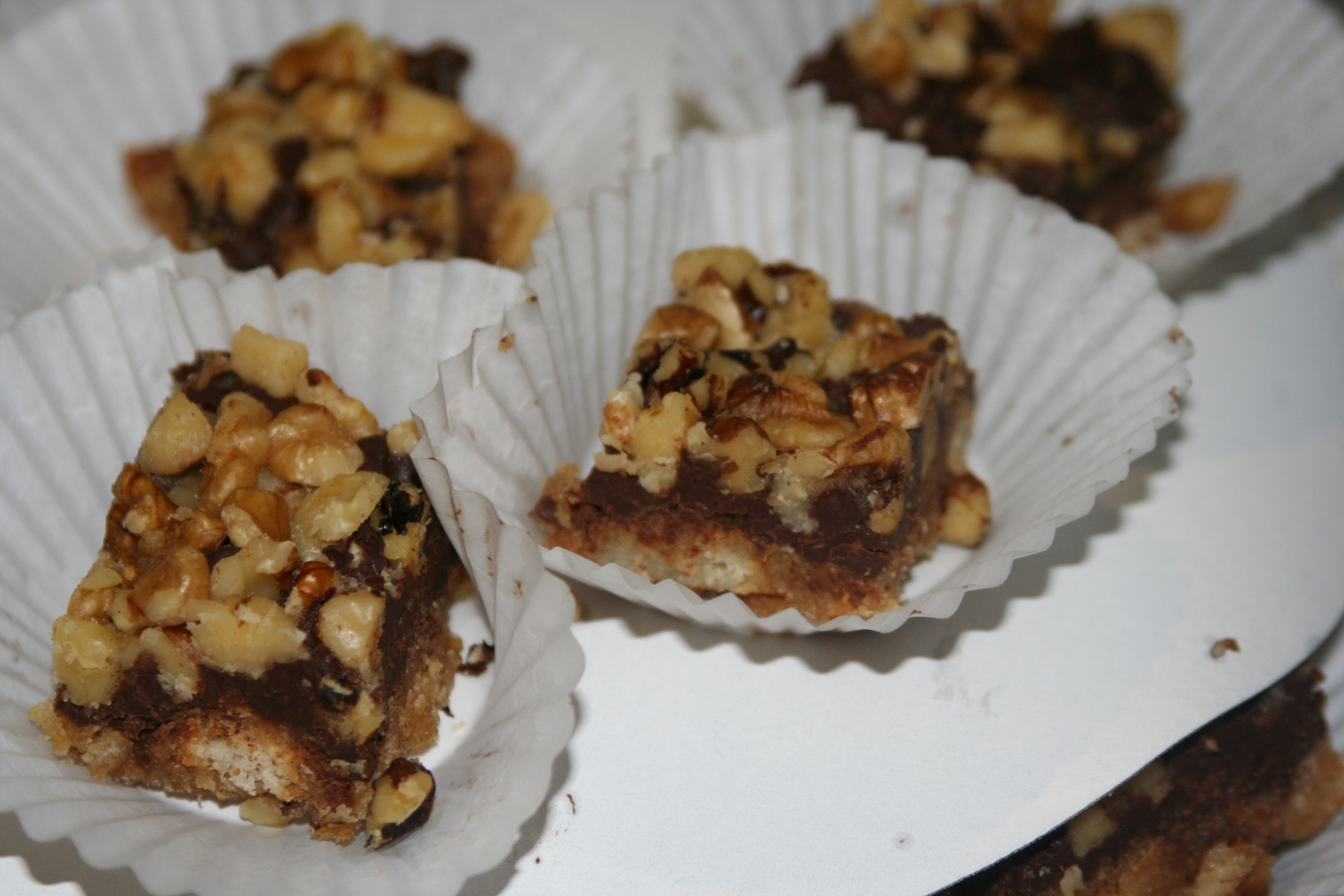
Bars topped with walnuts

Several manufacturers sell dessert bar mixes. Betty Crocker introduced Supreme Dessert Bar mixes in 1992, with lemon bar, chocolate peanut butter bar, and caramel oatmeal bar recipes. They added M&Ms Cookie Bars and Raspberry Bars the following year. In 2004, Krusteaz added a line of dessert bars to its selection of baking mixes. The U.S. Navy SEAL Guide to Fitness and Nutrition includes numerous bars in its "lightweight menus".

== See also ==
- Bar cookie, a type of dessert bar that includes brownies
- List of American desserts
- List of cookies
