= Lemon bar =

Popular American dessert

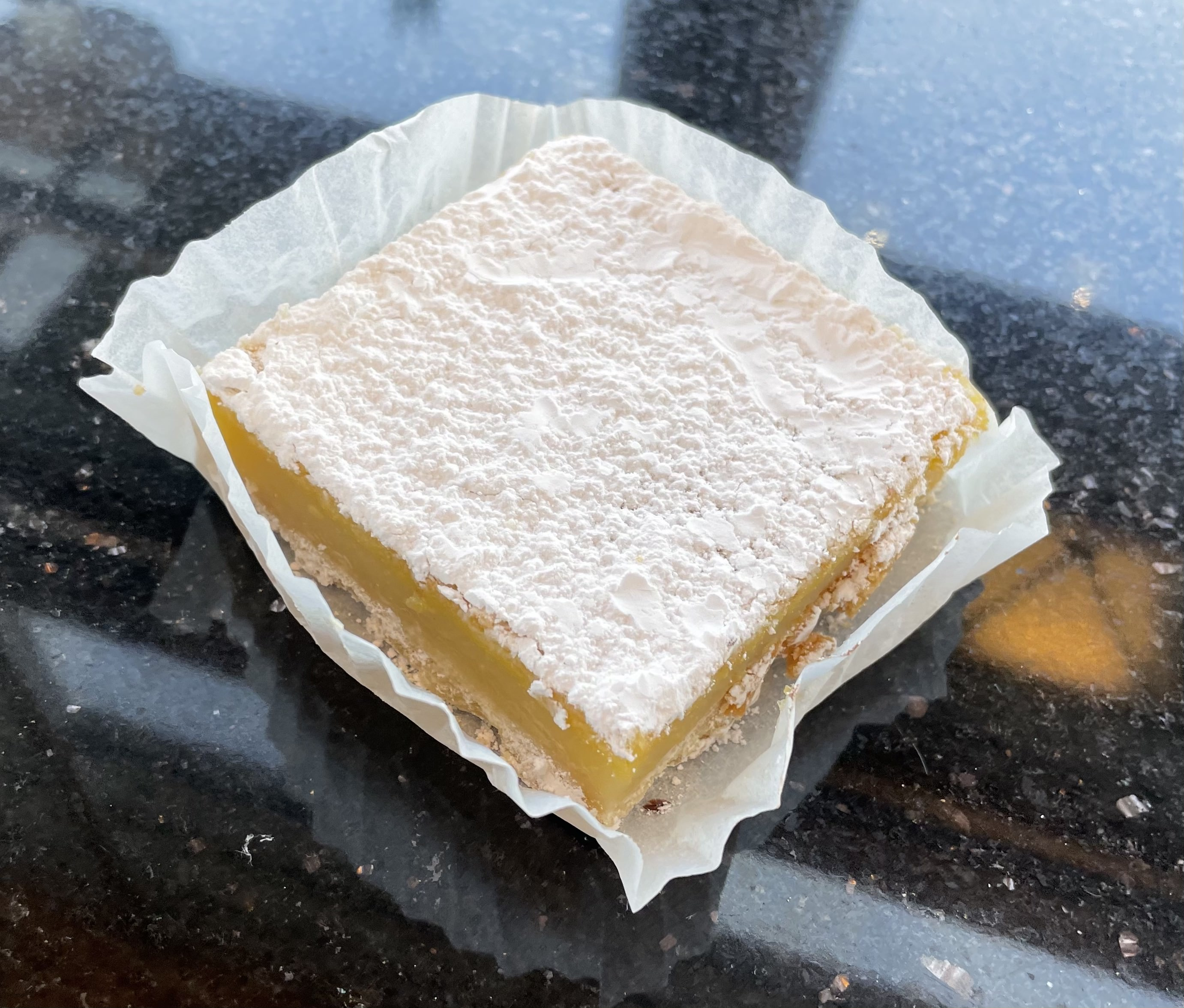
- Lemon bar wrapped in parchment paper
- Alternative names: Lemon square
- Type: Dessert Bar
- Course: Dessert
- Place of origin: United States
- Main ingredients: Lemon curd, shortbread
- Variations: Many variations exist

The lemon bar, also called lemon square, is a popular type of dessert bar in the United States consisting of a thin shortbread crust and a lemon curd filling.

== Origin and history ==
The first widely published lemon bar recipe was printed in the Chicago Daily Tribune on August 27, 1962, and submitted by Eleanor Mickelson. However, mentions of lemon bars and lemon squares can be found in earlier community cookbooks or small local newspapers.

There are two basic elements to a lemon bar, lemon curd and shortbread, each with its own history.

=== Lemon curd ===
Lemon curd dates back to 19th century England. However, early lemon curd was different from the lemon curd used today, such as in lemon bars. Instead, it consisted of acidic cream that formed curds and then was drained through a cheesecloth to separate out the whey.

=== Shortbread ===
Shortbread originated in Scotland as far back as the 12th century.

== Ingredients ==
Recipes vary slightly, but lemon bar recipes call for lemon juice, and many suggest fresh squeezed. Other ingredients include butter, white sugar, flour, eggs, and salt. Many recipes also list confectioners sugar, also called powdered sugar, for dusting on the top after the bars are baked. Many variations of lemon bars also exist.

=== Allergens ===
Allergens in lemon bars may include: eggs, dairy, and gluten. There are variations to accommodate for dietary restrictions, such as gluten-free lemon bars and vegan lemon bars.

=== Nutrition information ===
Krusteaz "Meyer Lemon bars" box mix lists 140 calories as prepared in one serving, a 2-inch bar. There are also 3 grams of fat, 26 grams of carbohydrates, 20 grams of sugar, 90 milligrams of sodium, and less than 1 gram of protein in a prepared box of Krusteaz "Meyer Lemon bars." Nutrition information will vary by recipe.

== Baking ==
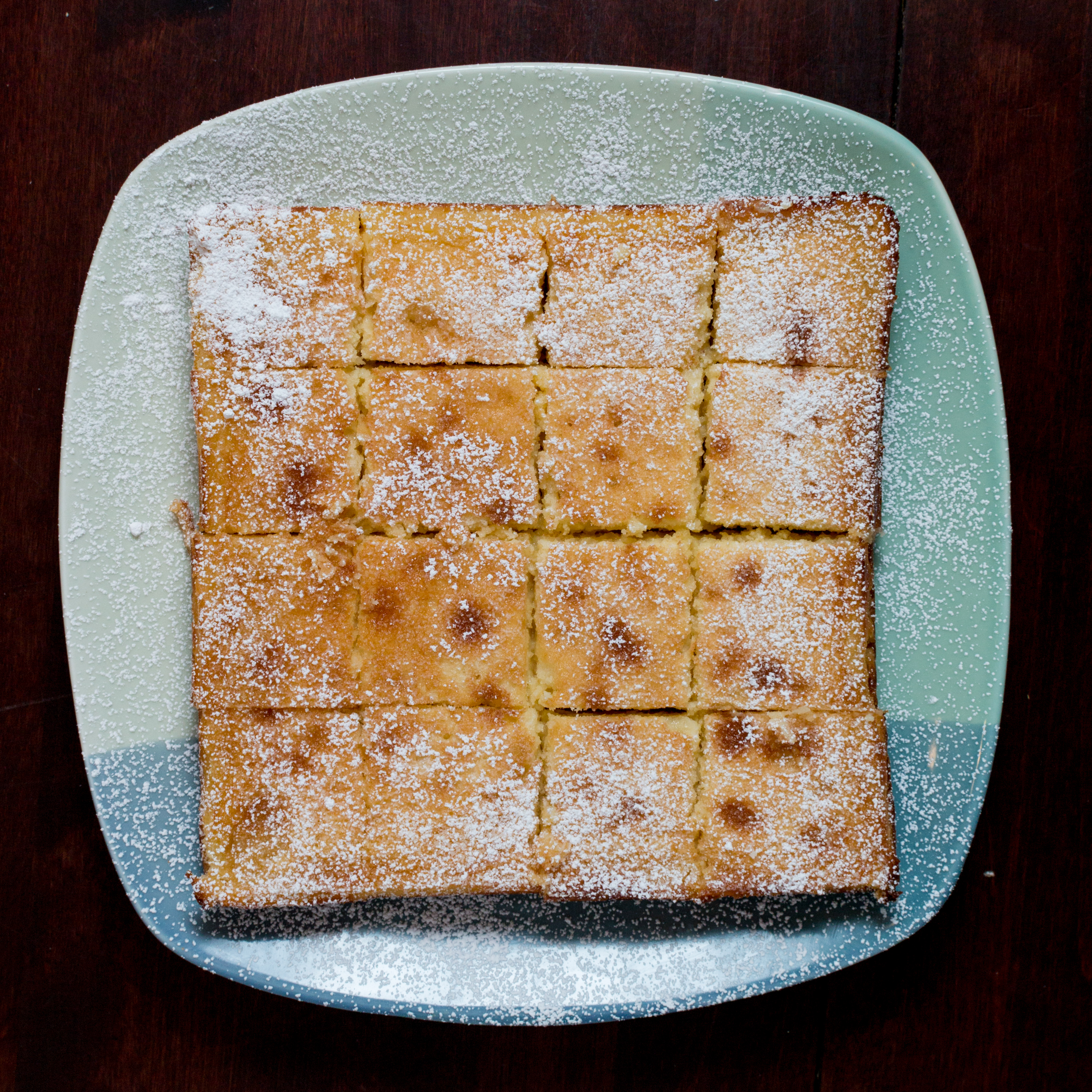
A plate of sliced homemade lemon bars

Lemon bars, as well as many other dessert bars are typically baked in the oven in a 9×13 inch baking pan.

The bars are baked in two steps. First, the crust is baked part of the way to ensure that it will not combine with the lemon curd and can support it. Second, the curd is added on top of the crust and the bars are baked the rest of the way. Lemon bars are baked at a temperature below 400 °F to avoid over-baking.

There are also options for lemon bar box-mix.

=== Serving ===
After the bars are baked and have cooled, they can be cut into squares or triangles. They can also be dusted with confectioners sugar to cater for consumer preferences.

== Present day ==
Lemon bars are a popular dessert in the United States and are common at many different types of events. There is even a National Lemon Bar Day that occurs on October 15 each year. This day was created by Michael McCarthy in 2019 after he baked lemon bars for an event and many people had never had them before.

=== Variations ===
==== Hawaii ====
In Hawaii, a popular variation of the lemon bar is made with lilikoʻi (passion fruit), where it is known as a lilikoʻi bar (anglicized as lilikoi bar). The passion fruit was introduced to Hawaii in the late 19th century where it now grows abundantly.

While fresh lilikoʻi juice is desired, the curd (also known as "lilikoʻi butter") is sometimes made with processed juice or concentrates in areas where fresh passionfruit is not available. Chopped macadamia nuts are sometimes added to the shortbread crust to make it more "tropical". Recipes using other tropical fruits exist but are not as popular include guava, mango, and pineapple.

The original creator of the lilikoi bars is not known, but it may be a result of the Hawaii regional cuisine movement in the early 1990s started by a group of local professional chefs who advocated for cuisine which drew from local ingredients instead of relying on imported produce such as lemons.

== See also ==
- Fruit curd
- Lemon tart
- List of American desserts
- List of lemon dishes and drinks
- Shortbread
