= Paul Logan (colonel) =

US Army officer

Colonel Paul P. Logan served as a US Army Quartermaster before and during World War II as the Deputy Director of the Subsistence Division, Office of the Quartermaster General. His most notable accomplishment was the development of the "Logan Bar", or Ration D bar, an emergency chocolate ration manufactured by Hershey Chocolate. He was also responsible for the adoption of dehydrated potatoes and onions.
