= Protein bar =

Type of snack bar high in protein

Protein bars
- Type: Bar
- Main ingredients: Various protein foods, sugar

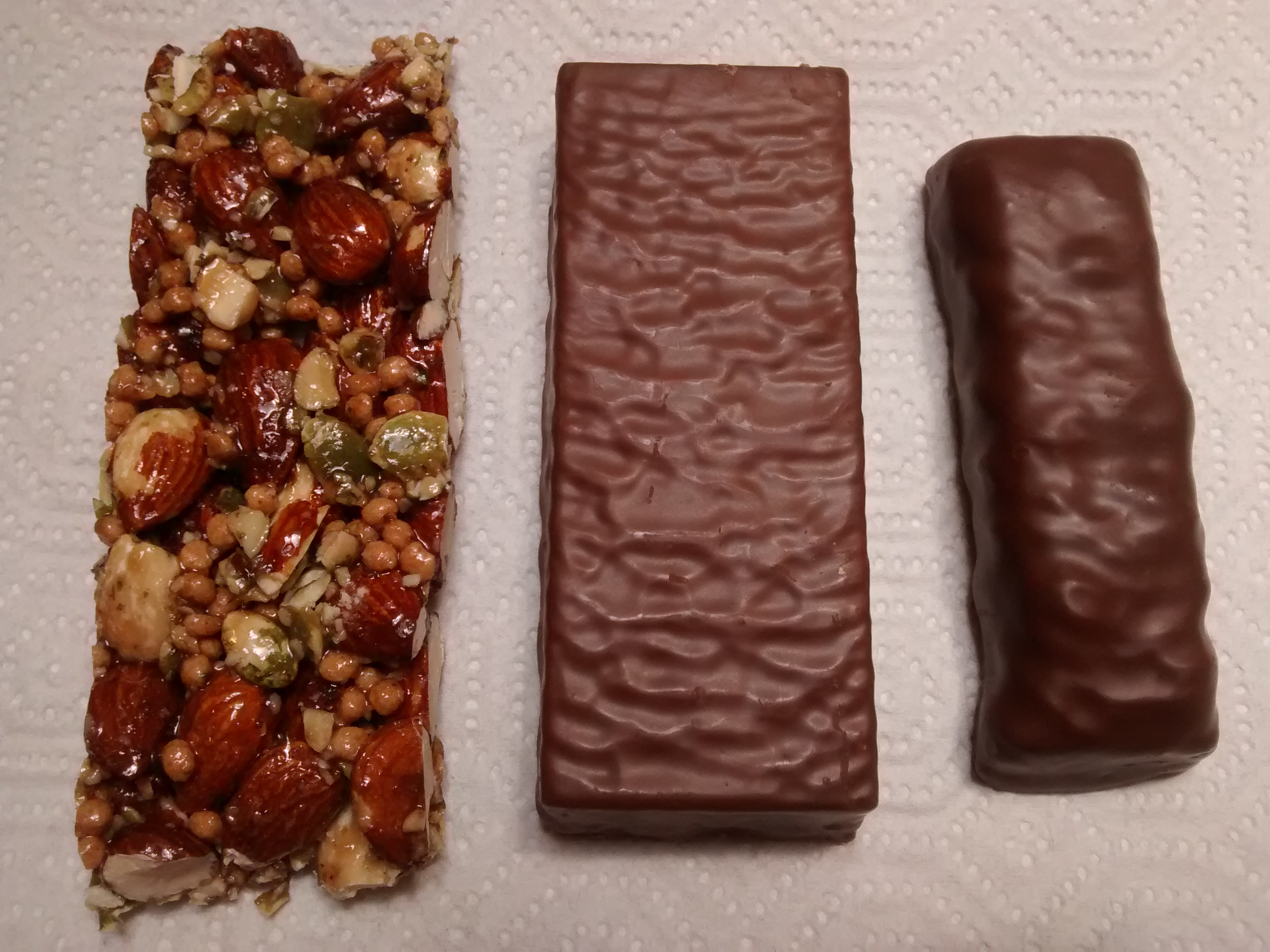
(From left to right) Kind bar, Clif bar, and LUNA bar

Protein bars are convenience food that contain a high proportion of protein relative to carbohydrates and fats. Despite the label focusing on protein, many mass-marketed protein bars contain more added sugar than some desserts like cookies or doughnuts, making them more like candy bars. The source of protein may be animal, e.g., whey or collagen, or plant (e.g., pea protein, or peanut).

== Dietary purpose ==
Protein bars are targeted to people who primarily want a convenient source of protein that does not require preparation (unless homemade). There are different kinds of food bars to fill different purposes. Energy bars provide the majority of their food energy (calories) in carbohydrate form. Meal replacement bars are intended to replace the variety of nutrients in a meal. Protein bars are usually lower in carbohydrates than energy bars, lower in vitamins and dietary minerals than meal replacement bars, and significantly higher in protein than either.

Protein bars may contain high levels of sugar and sometimes are called "candy bars in disguise". Alternative protein bars may use insect protein as an ingredient. Vegan protein bars contain only plant-based proteins from sources like peas, brown rice, hemp, and soybeans.

Protein bars are mainly marketed to athletes or exercise enthusiasts for muscle building or as a wellness-themed convenience food. The global market is growing and expected to reach US$2 billion in annual sales in 2026.

There is a disagreement over the amount of protein required for active individuals and athletic performance. Some research shows that protein supplementation is not necessary. Athletes generally consume higher levels of protein as compared to the general population for muscular hypertrophy and to reduce lean body mass lost during weight loss. Specialists have stated that the general American population is not lacking in protein.

== History ==
Bob Hoffman launched Hoffman's Hi-Proteen Fudge and Hoffman's Hi-Proteen Cookies in the early 1950s, and competitor Joe Weider launched Candy Food Bars with bodybuilder Dave Draper on the packaging in the late 1960s. Pillsbury Space Food Bars and the bars by Tiger's Milk both came to market in the 1960s. Though they had protein, they were marked as energy or nutrition bars. PowerBar, invented in California in 1986, was an early protein bar.

=== Regional markets ===
The Australian protein bar market, valued at about US$271 million in 2024, is expected to grow at a compound annual rate of 5–6 percent through the early 2030s.

== See also ==
- Bar (food), overview of bars
