= Seven-layer bars =

American dessert bar

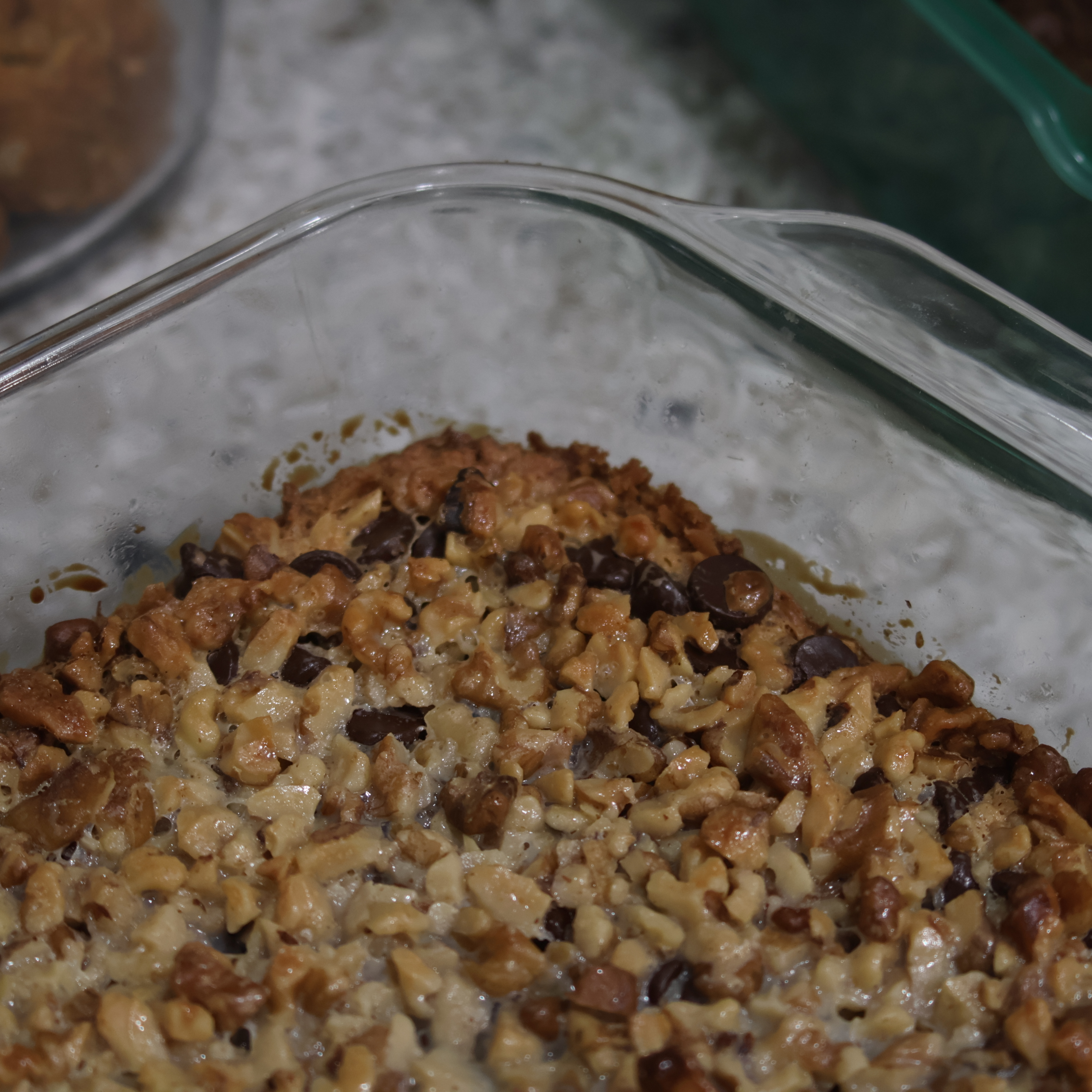

Seven-layer bars are an American dessert bar typically consisting of a graham cracker crust topped with layers of chocolate chips, nuts, coconut, and condensed milk. Despite the name, many versions do not consist of seven layers. They are sometimes served as a Christmas cookie.

Other names for the dessert include seven layer bars, seven-layer magic bars, magic bars, coconut dream bars, Santa snacks, or Hello Dolly bars.

== History ==
One source for the popularity of seven-layer bars comes from the Eagle Brand company, which included a recipe for "magic cookie bars" on the back of their cans of condensed milk. An alternate source claims that they were popularized by the Betty Crocker Cookbook series.

Seven-layer bars are often connected to or named for the musical Hello, Dolly!, for unclear reasons. Clementine Paddleford's food column for This Week popularized them under this name, based on a recipe sent in by an 11-year-old child, Alecia Leigh Couch of Dallas.

Seven-layer bars are sometimes considered a type of cookie.

== Ingredients ==
Recipes for seven-layer bars typically have a graham cracker crust, but can be made with other types of crust such as a shortbread crust, cracker crust or Oreo cookie crust. Some versions incorporate shredded coconut into the crust. The crust is then topped with a layer of chocolate chips and sometimes also butterscotch chips. Another layer that is added consists of chopped nuts such as walnuts or pecans. The bars are typically then topped with condensed milk, although some versions place the condensed milk layer immediately above the crust. Many variations of them are commonly made.

Some of these ingredients are shared with the Canadian confetti square and other dessert bars.

== See also ==
- Seven-layer dip
- Seven-layer salad
