= Cereal bar =

Cereal bar may refer to:

- Energy bar, which contains cereal and other ingredients
- Flapjack (oat bar), also known as a muesli bar
- Granola bar
