= Nanaimo bar =

Canadian no-bake dessert

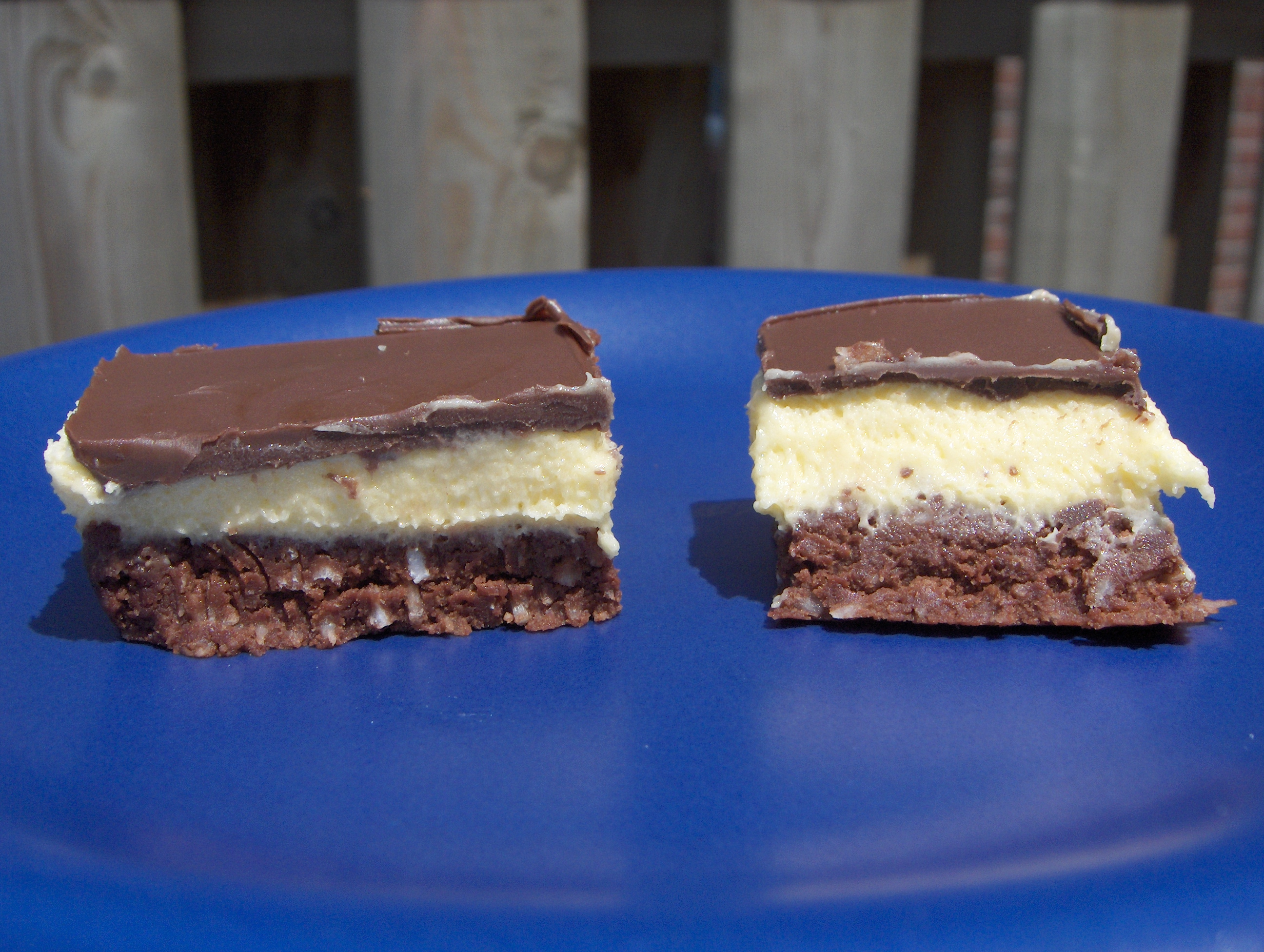
- Alternative names: Mabel's Squares
- Course: Dessert
- Place of origin: Canada
- Region or state: Nanaimo, British Columbia, Canada
- Main ingredients: Crumb, icing, chocolate
- Variations: Many types of crumb and icing

The Nanaimo bar (/nəˈnaɪmoʊ/ nə-NY-moh) is a bar dessert that requires no baking and is named after the Canadian city of Nanaimo in British Columbia. It consists of three layers: at the bottom, a wafer, nut (walnuts, almonds, or pecans), and coconut crumb base; custard icing in the middle; and a layer of chocolate ganache on top. Many varieties exist, consisting of various types of crumb, various flavours of icing (such as peanut butter, coconut, or mocha), and various types of chocolate.

== Origins ==
The recipe for Nanaimo bars was developed and circulated in Canadian communities in a variety of forms before it acquired its name, rendering its true origin ambiguous. Culturally, it belonged to the category of "dainties": desserts which could be served at church suppers and private entertainments. Dessert squares and other "dainties" became particularly important to Canadian social life after World War II. As women were excluded from the workplace, baking became a status symbol for women who could serve desserts with expensive ingredients (such as butter, sugar, and pre-made brand-name goods) and time-consuming techniques.

Lenore Newman, a scholar of food geography, argues that the Nanaimo bar derives from a 1947 recipe for unbaked chocolate cake, which matches early recipes for the bottom layer. The earliest confirmed printed copy of the recipe using the name "Nanaimo bars" appears in the Edith Adams' prize cookbook (14th edition) from 1953. (Note: A copy of the book is on view at the Nanaimo Museum.) The same recipe was published in the Vancouver Sun earlier that same year under the name "London Fog Bar". The recipe later also appears in the publication His/Her Favourite Recipes, Compiled by the Women's Association of the Brechin United Church (1957), with the recipe submitted by Joy Wilgress, a Baltimore, Maryland, native. (Brechin United Church is in Nanaimo.)

In 1954, the recipe "Mabel's Squares" was published in The Country Woman's Favourite by the Upper Gloucester Women's Institute (New Brunswick). The recipe was submitted by Mrs. Harold Payne, the daughter of Mabel (Knowles) Scott (1883–1957). (Note: The ingredients list, quantities, and fabrication closely match the recipe found on the City of Nanaimo's website.)

The first printing of recipes featuring Nanaimo bar ingredients is found in the 1952 Women's Auxiliary to the Nanaimo Hospital Cookbook, which features three nearly identical recipes that differ only slightly from the modern Nanaimo bar. They are referred to as the "chocolate square" or the "chocolate slice".

Other unconfirmed references date the bar back to the 1930s, when it was said to be known locally as "chocolate fridge cake". One modern reference mentions the bars' existence in 19th century Nanaimo.

== Popularity ==
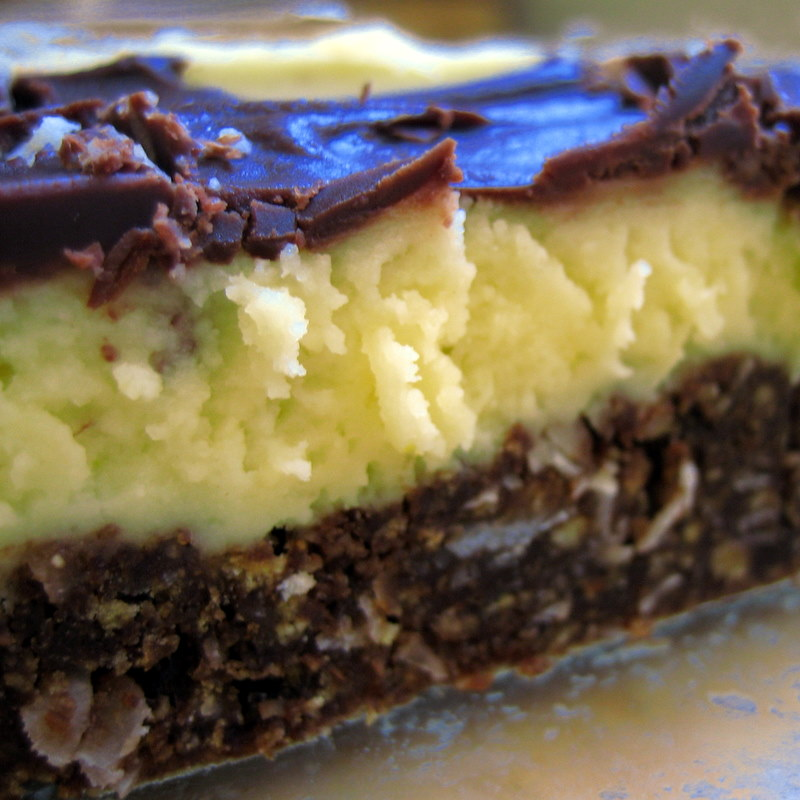
Close-up

Many 1950s recipes, especially those associated with suburban home cooking, soon lost their popularity. Lenore Newman credits the Vancouver caterer Susan Mendleson with maintaining the popularity of the Nanaimo bar by selling them at her Lazy Gourmet Cafe in the 1970s. The Lazy Gourmet claims to be the first business to sell Nanaimo bars commercially, and Mendleson further promoted the dessert with three recipes in the official cookbook she oversaw for the Expo 86 world fair in Vancouver.

The popularity of the bar in Nanaimo led local residents to mobilise to have it voted "Canada's Favourite Confection" in a National Post reader survey. In 1985, Mayor Graeme Roberts initiated a contest to find the ultimate Nanaimo bar recipe. The recipe submitted by Joyce Hardcastle, a resident of Nanaimo, was unanimously selected by a panel of judges. The Nanaimo bar was popularized nationwide after being highlighted as a classic Canadian dessert at Expo 86.

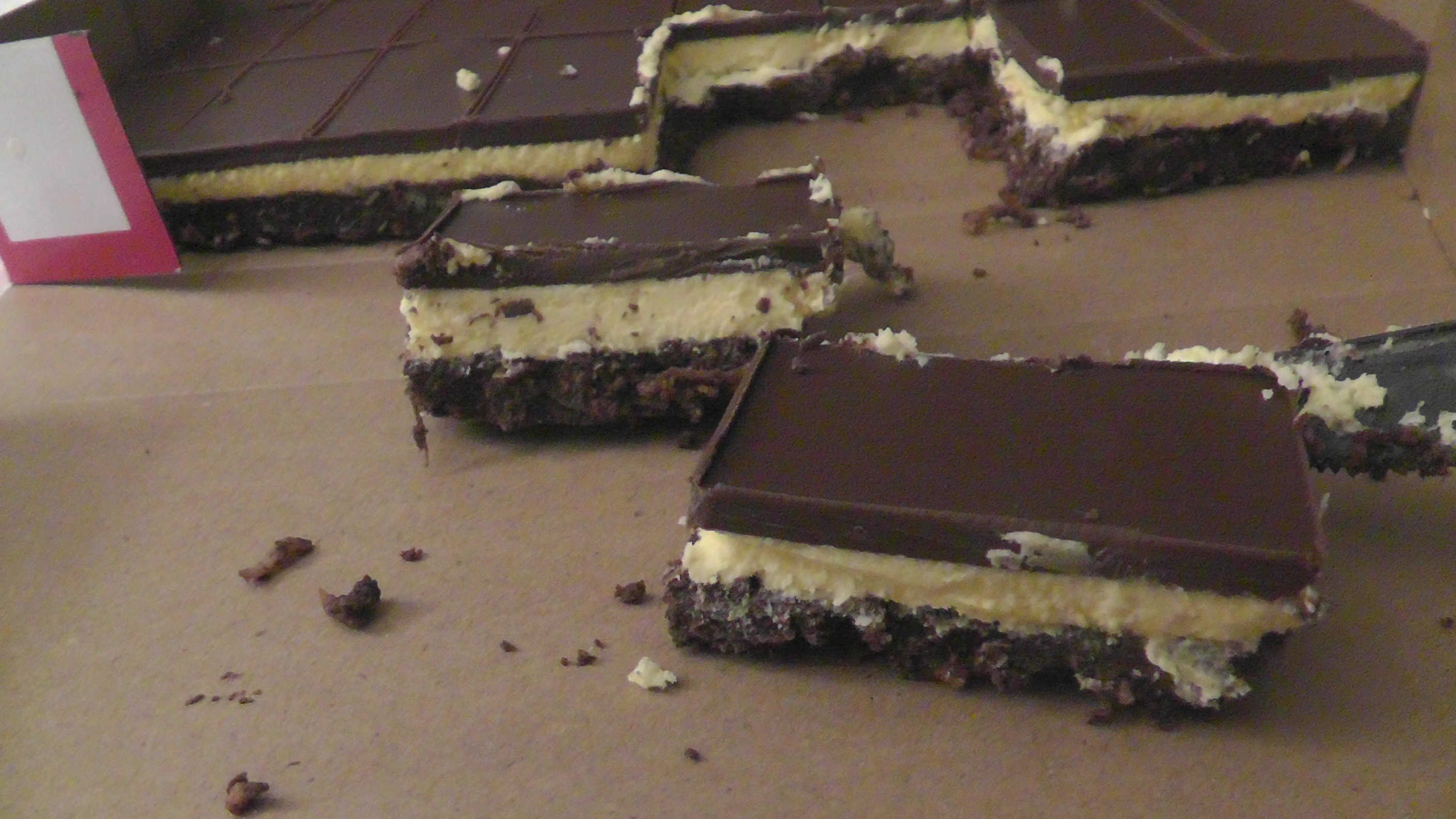
A tray of Nanaimo bars from M&M Food Market with a few bars detached

Recipes for similar desserts are found in various places, under various names, in North America and Europe. The designation "Nanaimo bar" is Canadian, and appears in the Canadian Oxford Dictionary, but not in other language or dialect versions.

An episode from the first season of the competition television show MasterChef Canada features an elimination challenge where competitors made desserts inspired by Nanaimo bars, chosen among three Canadian desserts.

A 2016 US state dinner in honour of Canadian Prime Minister Justin Trudeau featured Nanaimo bars as the main dessert. The elaborate dinner, hosted by then-US President Barack Obama and his wife Michelle Obama, consisted of a blend of American and Canadian dishes. The Nanaimo bars were presented on a plate inspired by the Rocky Mountains.

In April 2019, Canada Post announced the release of a booklet of postage stamps dedicated to Canadian desserts and sweets. The booklet of 10 stamps features images of the Nanaimo bar, the butter tart, tarte au sucre (sugar pie), blueberry grunt, and Saskatoon berry pie. Canada Post described the stamps as "fun-shaped", and the booklet of stamps resembled a recipe card. The image of the Nanaimo bar on the stamp received some criticism for its ratio of the three layers.

== See also ==
- List of desserts
- List of Canadian inventions and discoveries
- Canadian cuisine
- Cremino
- London fog (beverage)
