= PowerBar =

American maker of energy bars and related products

- Type: Subsidiary
- Industry: Food processing
- Founded: 1986; 40 years ago
- Founder: Brian Maxwell, Jennifer Biddulph
- Fate: Acquired by Nestlé in 2000, becoming a brand.
- Headquarters: Glendale, California, United States
- Area served: North America, Europe
- Products: Energy bars, sports drinks, gels
- Revenue: US$175 million (2013)
- Owner: Nestlé (2000–14); Post Holdings (2014–pres.)
- Parent: Active Nutrition International GmbH
- Website: powerbar.com

PowerBar is an American brand of energy bars and other related products including sports drinks, gels, and the Pria bars targeted at women. The company was established in 1986 and was acquired by Nestlé in 2000 and by Post Holdings in 2014.

PowerBar is part of Germany-based Active Nutrition International alongside Premier Protein and Dymatize. It is a subsidiary of BellRing Brands, of which Post Holdings is the majority owner.

== History ==
The PowerBar company was founded by Brian Maxwell, a Canadian athlete and entrepreneur, along with Jennifer Biddulph, and Mike McCollum. They started in Maxwell's kitchen, where they formulated the recipe using the knowledge of Jennifer Biddulph, a nutritionist. The two eventually married. They used $55,000 in cash to launch the company in 1986 in Berkeley, California. This was the first "energy bar" for use during competition by endurance athletes, such as ultramarathoners and cyclists. They eventually acquired a headquarters building in downtown Berkeley.

The company eventually reached $150 million in sales before being purchased by Nestlé in 2000 for $375 million. In February 2007, PowerBar moved its headquarters from Berkeley, California, to the Nestlé headquarters in Glendale, California.

On February 3, 2014, Post Holdings announced it had reached an agreement to acquire PowerBar, Musashi and related worldwide assets from Nestlé. Following the acquisition, PowerBar became part of Active Nutrition International, which is headquartered in Munich, Germany.

== See also ==
- List of California companies
- List of food companies
