= Soldier Fuel =

U.S. military energy bar

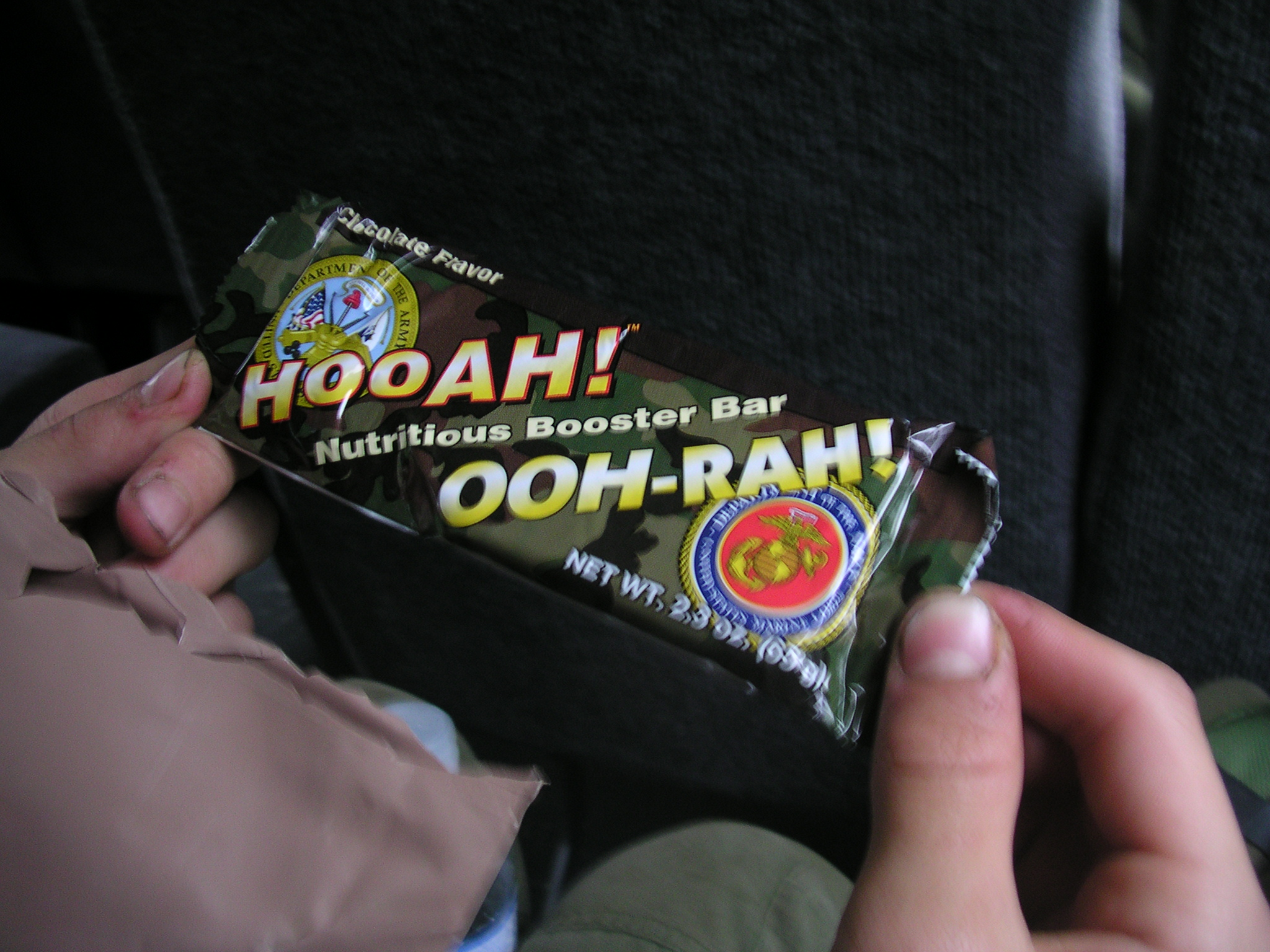
- Hooah! Bar before rebranding as Soldier Fuel
- Product type: Energy bar
- Current owner: Aleco Bravo-Greenberg
- Produced by: D'Andrea Brothers LLC
- Country: United States
- Introduced: 1996
- Markets: United States
- Tagline: "Designed for soldiers. Perfect for you."
- Website: soldierfuel.com

The Soldier Fuel bar, formerly known as Hooah! bar, is a dairy-based calcium-enriched energy bar created by the United States military in 1996. It was originally provided to military personnel packaged within a field ration, such as the Meal, Ready-to-Eat, Meal Cold Weather, or First Strike Ration.

== Origin ==
The bar was created in 1996 by the Department of Defense Combat Feeding Directorate at the U.S. Army Soldier Systems Center in Natick, Massachusetts. The name comes from the word "hooah", an expression of high morale, strength and confidence most commonly used by the United States Army. As the Marine Corps preferred the word "Oohrah!" instead, the bar originally had "HOOAH!" and the US Army seal on one side and "OOH-RAH!" and the US Marine Corps seal on the other; newer wrappers have both logos on the same side. The commercial version features the United States roundel instead.

The original military HOOAH! Bar came in apple-cinnamon, chocolate, raspberry, cran-raspberry, and peanut butter flavors. The smaller First Strike bars (provided in the concentrated First Strike Ration) come in the same flavors, except peanut butter (mocha is used instead).

== Commercial availability ==
In 2004, the brothers Christian and Mark D'Andrea (D'Andrea Brothers LLC) licensed the "HOOAH!" trademark from the Army for commercial sales and started marketing the bar to the public. The brothers changed the wrapper from camouflage to red and blue, and a portion of the proceeds was to go to the Army laboratories that develop food for troops in the field. The bar was due to go on sale in about 15,000 stores across the United States in June 2005, priced at $1.99. The energy bar is now named "Soldier Fuel" instead of HOOAH!, and provides 270–280 Cal (1,100–1,200 kJ), 10 grams of protein, 8–9 grams of fat and 40–42 grams of carbohydrates. While "Soldier Fuel" was offered in both chocolate and peanut butter in 2017, as of early 2020, it is offered only in chocolate.

== See also ==
- Military rations
- D-ration
- BP-5 Compact Food
- Ninja diet
