= Krusteaz =

Consumer food product brand line

- Type: Baking mix, pancake
- Inception: 1932
- Manufacturer: The Krusteaz Company (formerly Continental Mills)
- Website: www.krusteaz.com

Krusteaz is a consumer food product brand line of Tukwila, Washington-based Continental Mills, now The Krusteaz Company. Its original product was "the world's first" just-add-water pie crust mix, followed by a factory-prepared, shelf-stable flour and dried buttermilk mixture, developed in 1946 or 1947 at the home economics department of the University of Washington, for making baked items including biscuits, pancakes, waffles, cobbler and dump cake.

The brand name "Crust Ease", changed to "Krusteaz", was coined and the company founded in 1932, reportedly by four members of a Seattle bridge club; known co-founder Ada Rose Gilbreath Charters was from a Columbia County pioneer family, and raised on a farm in Dayton before attending Washington State University, back when it was known as Washington Agricultural College. She and her husband James Charters were the original owner-operators of the business.

As of September 2022, Krusteaz employed over 400 people in the Kent–Tukwila facilities – a Kent Valley facility constructed in 1986 – up from 300 in 2020, with over 800 total, including in Effingham, Illinois, Manhattan, Kansas, and Hopkinsville, Kentucky, manufacturing over 150 products (e.g., muffin mixes, quick breads, snacks, cider), some for private labels and licensed brands.

Hundreds of pounds of Krusteaz may be used in a single pancake feed.
