= Energy bar =

Cereal snack bar

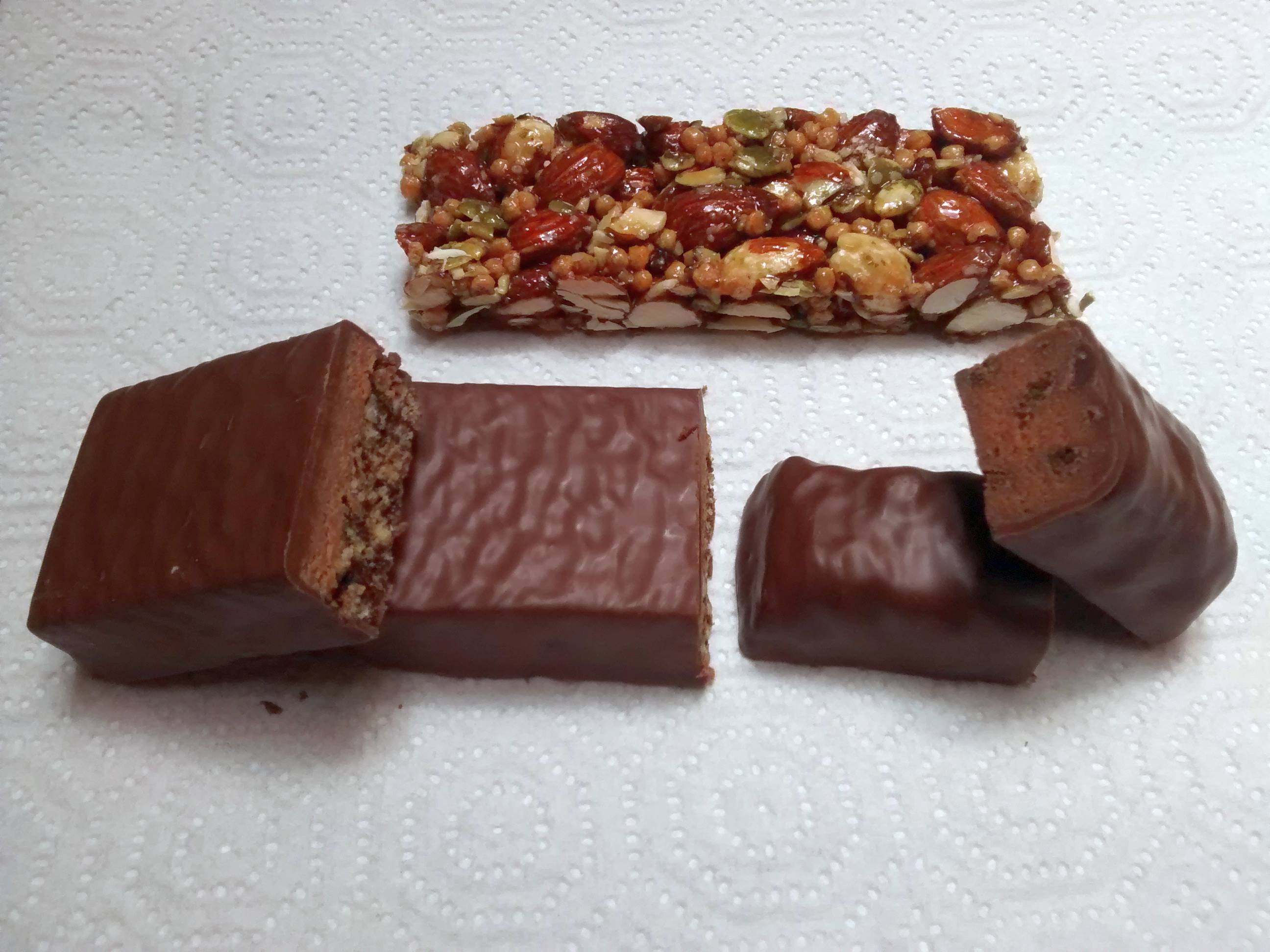
Energy bars vary in size, ingredients, and nutritional benefits.

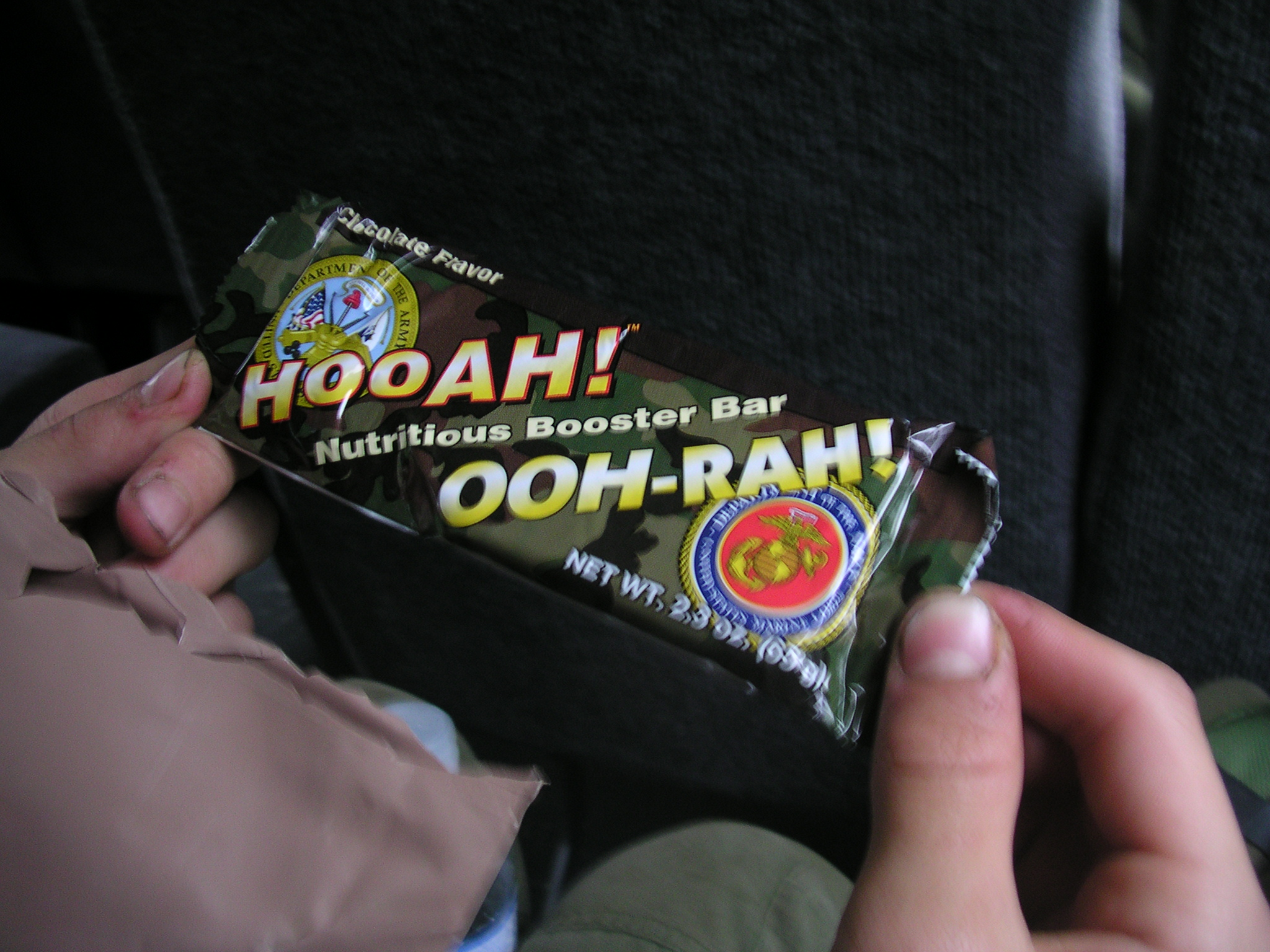
A HOOAH! energy bar provided by the United States Army in its MREs

Energy bars are supplemental snack bars containing cereals, micronutrients, and flavor ingredients intended to supply quick food energy. Because most energy bars contain added protein, carbohydrates, dietary fiber, and other nutrients, they may be marketed as functional foods. Manufacturing of energy bars may supply nutrients in sufficient quantity to be used as meal replacements.

== Nutrition ==
A typical energy bar weighs between 30 and 50 grams and is likely to supply about 200–300 calories (840–1,300 joules), 3–9 grams of fat, 7–15 grams of protein, and 20–40 grams of carbohydrates — the three sources of energy in food. In order to provide energy quickly, most of the carbohydrates are various types of sugars like fructose, glucose, maltodextrin and others in various ratios, combined with complex carbohydrate sources, such as oats or barley.

== Use ==
Energy bars are used in a variety of contexts. Energy bars may be used as an energy source during athletic events such as marathons, triathlons and other activities which require a high energy expenditure for long periods of time. They are also commonly used as meal replacements in weight-loss programs. They may be used as a snack. For those who are malnourished, energy bars, such as Plumpy'nut, are an effective food for treating malnutrition.

== See also ==
- Bar (food), overview of bars
- Protein bar
- Energy gel
- Sports drink
- High energy biscuits
- Kanemochi
- Flapjack (oat bar)
- Ninja diet
- D ration
