= Individual Meal Pack =

Canadian packaged field ration

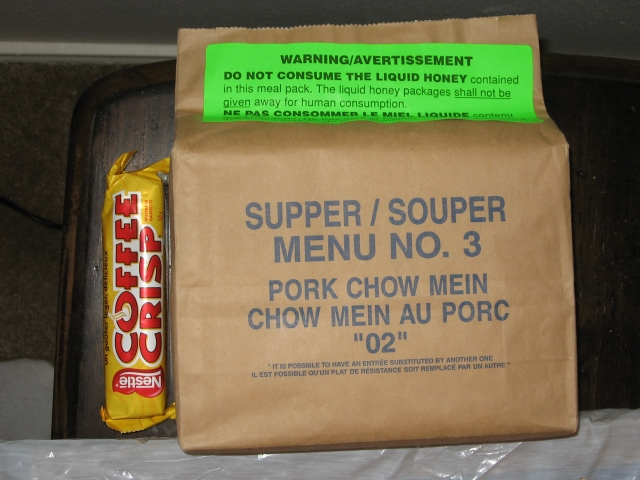
An IMP pork chow mein meal (Coffee Crisp bar included for scale)

The Individual Meal Pack (IMP; French: repas individuel de combat) is one type of field ration used by the Canadian Armed Forces. The IMP is designed so that a continuous diet provides all the nutrition needed to sustain a service member in the field. The IMP meets Canada's nutrition requirements, with the exception of calcium and folic acid, which are not significant if the consumption period of rations is less than 30 (consecutive) days. IMPs provide 1,200–1,400 calories (5.0–5.9 MJ) per meal.

Three IMPs (breakfast, lunch and dinner) provide approximately 3,600 calories (15 MJ), enough to nourish a soldier undergoing strenuous physical activity. The meals are precooked and can therefore be safely consumed either heated or unheated. Under ideal circumstances the entrees are generally consumed heated. There are meals available for Jews, Muslims, Hindus and vegetarians.

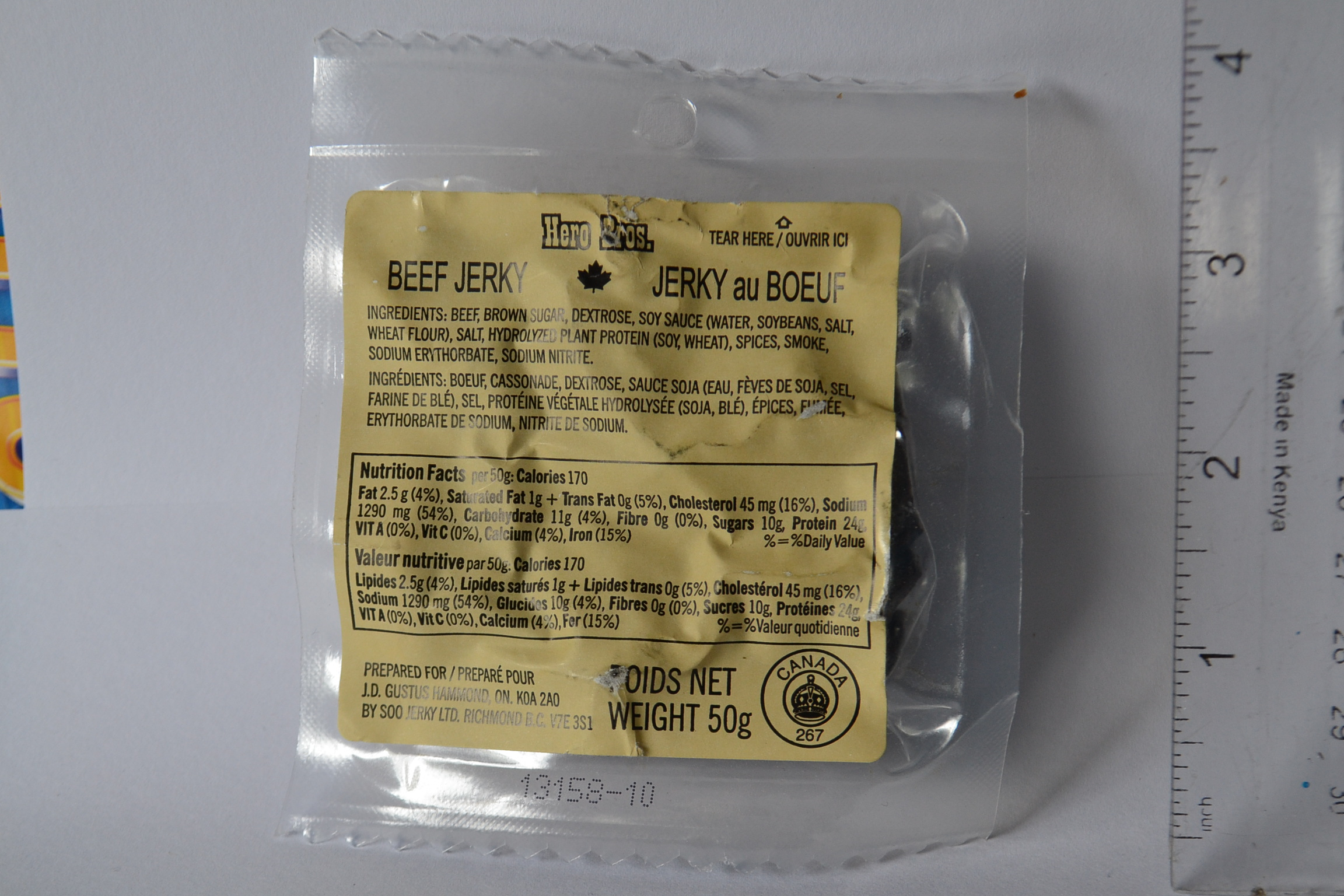
In 2015 IMPs include a variety of items, such as pulled pork, poutine and beef jerky (above)

Contents of the combat rations are subject to a three-year research and development cycle, where new meals are added, and some replaced. Every second year, new meals are field tested by three groups of 60 people drawn from each of the three Regular Force mechanized brigade groups. In all, there are 21 meals available – seven breakfasts and 14 meals suitable as noon or evening meals. In addition to the main meal, each IMP contains assorted basics such as powdered coffee, protein and sports drink mixes, energy bars, trail mix, peanut butter, cereal, condiments, candy, chocolate, gum, a plastic spoon, a wet towelette and matches.

Meals are packaged fully cooked and do not require cooking. While edible cold, when circumstances permit the ideal method of preparation is to cook the entrees either in a pressure cooker, heated on the standard issue Coleman stove, or by simply boiling the rations in its package in water. Another way to warm the meal when a stove is unavailable is by putting it in the pocket of a coat during winter. Chemical cooking pouches have also been issued, allowing for flameless meal heating. Other items can also be improved by boiling or adding water, such as packages of soup, rice, powdered drinks and even the prepackaged bread, which is dense and can be softened by exposure to the pressure cooker.

Another technique developed by soldiers in the field is putting the package in the grill covering the exhaust on many armoured vehicles, and on radiators of wheeled vehicles. Some armoured vehicles come with a built-in pressure cooker.

== History ==
The IMPs appeared in the Canadian Forces in the 1980s, replacing early canned rations (Individual Ration Pack (IRP), Canadian Army Mess Tin Ration, Compo rations). The main menu items of the IMP are "boil in a bag" (known as a "retort pouch") and require less preparation time and equipment than the previous canned rations. Another stated advantage is that preparation using retort pouches can be done using less heat, reducing the impact on the taste of the food.

== Preparation and cooking ==
For IMPs from 2019 and beforehand, the main entrée and the dessert portion are contained in retort pouches, which are then packaged in cardboard boxes. These cardboard boxes are positioned inside the IMP package on the outer sides, sandwiching the other contents, so the IMP itself looks like it is entirely contained within a cardboard box inside the outer foil-lined paper bag. IMPs are usually "stripped" before field use by removing the cumbersome packaging and discarding extraneous elements individual soldiers do not wish to carry with them, such as the cardboard boxes containing the main entrée and dessert, and any condiments that an individual soldier may not personally use. As of 2020 new packaging has been created to help with usability and edibility. Notably, the external packaging is resealable and waterproof. Inside, the cardboard boxes have been removed to reduce weight, and the entrée and the dessert pouches have been strengthened, and a resealable beverage pouch has been provided for cold (powdered beverages). It is also not uncommon to see service members drinking hot drinks (coffees, teas, hot chocolates) out the resealable pouch, even though it is not recommended. The new method of heating has greatly improved over the previous options. The member simply puts their meal packet into a flameless ration heater. The chemical reaction generates enough heat to ensure a hot meal.

== Other rations ==
Other types of rations used by the Canadian Forces:

- Fresh rations, or cooked meals provided directly from the kitchen or by haybox.
- Patrol packs, small high-protein snack-type foods (such as beef jerky or shredded cheese)
- Boxed lunches (consisting of assorted sandwiches, juice, fruit, pasta and a dessert, packed in a paper box) provided for members when neither meal preparation nor the delivery of haybox-style fresh rations is possible, such as travelling for training within Canada or spending the day on a shooting range.

The IMP is intended to be issued when fresh rations are not possible. They can also be consumed as emergency rations, unheated.

== See also ==
- Field ration
- LRP ration
- Meal, Ready-to-Eat
- United States military ration
