= Steve1989MREInfo =

American YouTuber

- Born: 1989 or 1990 (age 36–37)
- Other name: Steve1989
- Occupation: Landscaper
- Known for: Eating military rations

YouTube information
- Channel: Steve1989MREInfo
- Years active: 2015–present
- Genres: Vlog; unboxing; documentary; military history
- Subscribers: 2.24 million
- Views: 432 million
- Last updated: 23 April 2026

Steven Thomas (born 1989 or 1990), known online as Steve1989MREInfo, is an American YouTuber and military history commentator, best known for his YouTube video content in which he unboxes and eats military rations.

== Early and personal life ==
Thomas's interest in military rations began as a youth in 1997 when his uncle purchased a case of Meal, Ready-to-Eat (MRE) rations from a surplus store. The first ration Thomas ate from the case was a ham slice meal manufactured in 1993, which he ate cold because he did not know how to use the included flameless ration heater.

Outside of YouTube, Thomas works as a landscaper in Lakeland, Florida. Despite his interest in military rations, Thomas is not a military veteran.

== Internet career ==
Thomas began his YouTube channel in November 2015. He first gained notoriety in January 2016 for a video in which he ate 61-year-old peanut butter from a Korean War-era C-ration. Later that year, a video review of Thomas eating American Civil War-era hardtack from 1863 went viral.

Thomas has reviewed both vintage and contemporary rations of several armed forces from around the world, including those from the American, British, Canadian, Russian, Ukrainian, Australian, Japanese, South Korean and Chinese militaries. He has reviewed a variety of military chocolate, including the American World War II-era D-ration and Tropical Bar. Thomas also reviews and smokes the cigarettes included in rations, the oldest being a 123-year-old cigarette dating to 1897. Because many of the rations Thomas opens are extremely rare, he has stated that he will only open and review a ration once he has obtained a duplicate that will remain unopened in a private collection.

Thomas' video voice-overs have gained traction within his subscriber community for their calm delivery, and signature catch-phrases such as "nice hiss" (referring to the sound sometimes made when opening hermetically sealed ration packages) and "Let's get this out onto a tray. Nice!" (referencing laying out the ration items onto a table, before hard-cutting to them neatly arranged on a mess kit). He almost always ends his videos with the catchphrase, "This is Steve1989. I... hope you liked the video, and I'll be coming back at you with something new... or old. Alright, cool. See ya."

=== Complications ===
Despite eating rations that are well beyond the recommended shelf life specified by manufacturers, Thomas has reported that he rarely becomes ill from eating them. As of 2023, he is only known to have become ill from two rations—a Ukrainian ration in 2015 (before his YouTube channel began), for which he was hospitalized for E. coli; and a Chinese PLA Type 13 ration in 2019, which he harshly criticized while reviewing—both of which were only one year old and in-date when he ate them. He has described a cheese spread from a 1985 MRE as "the grossest thing I've ever tasted, because it literally felt like fire. And bitterness."

Thomas took a brief hiatus in mid-2020 after injuring tendons in his right arm, according to his pinned YouTube comment in the comments section of his then-most-recent video. He made his next video as soon as the brace was removed from his arm.

== See also ==
- Eating History
- Max Miller (YouTuber)
- List of YouTube personalities
