= Close Combat Assault Ration =

U.S. military compact assault ration

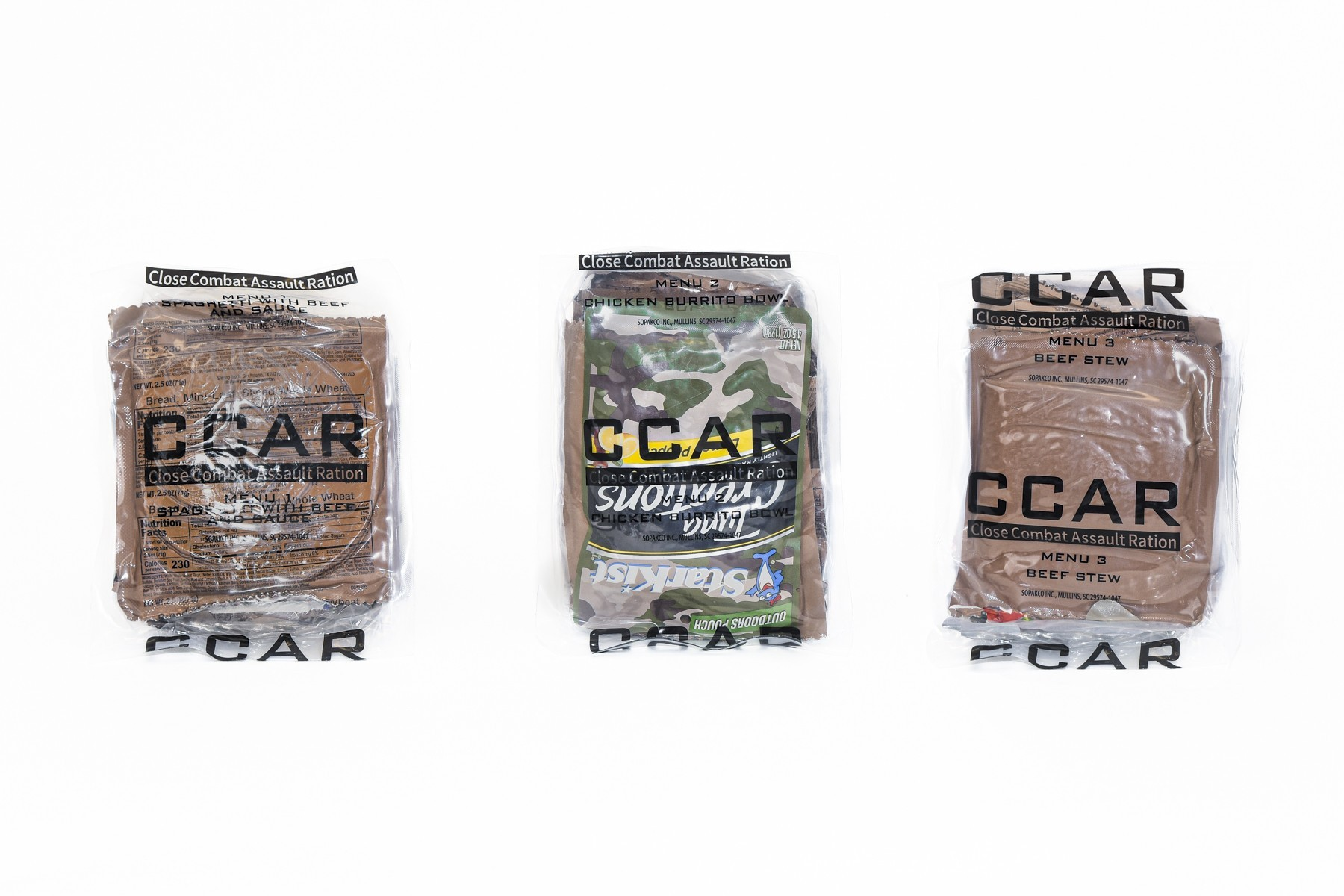
The three menu options of the Close Combat Assault Ration. Menu 1: Spaghetti with Beef and Sauce, Menu 2: Chicken Burrito Bowl, and Menu 3: Beef Stew

The Close Combat Assault Ration (CCAR) is a self-contained individual United States military ration introduced in 2025 as a compact assault ration designed for short durations of highly mobile, high intensity combat operations.

It replaces the First Strike Ration (FSR) and is designed to have a 39% reduction in volume and a 17% reduction in weight, allowing soldiers to carry five days of food in the space previously occupied by three.

== History ==
The preceding FSR was first announced in 2002 with the intention of giving soldiers a lightweight alternative to the Meal, Ready-to-Eat that could be consumed on the move during the first 72 hours of a conflict, in a package that was substantially lighter and smaller. It was introduced in late 2007.

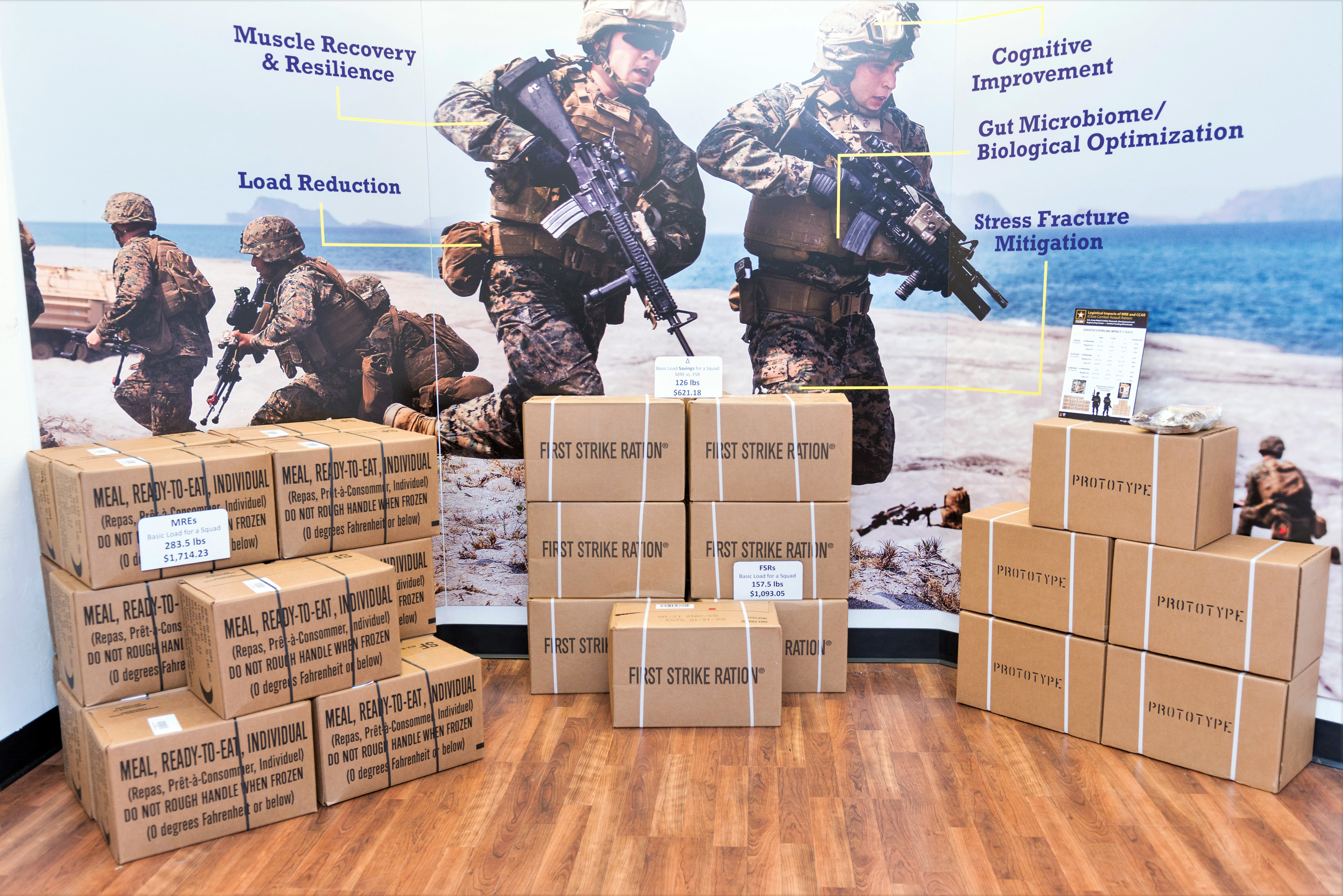
A 2018 demonstration of the reduced volume of the CCAR, compared to MRE and First Strike rations

By 2019, it too was deemed too heavy and bulky, and a project was launched to develop a replacement. Development was led by the Combat Capabilities Development Command Soldier Center's Department of Defense Combat Feeding Division (CFD) and supported by the Tufts University Sensory Science Center.

In 2019, developers sought feedback from the 10th Special Forces Group and the 10th Mountain Division of the US Army, and the 2nd Reconnaissance Battalion, 2nd Marine Division of the US Marine Corps. Initial field testing was delayed by the COVID-19 pandemic.

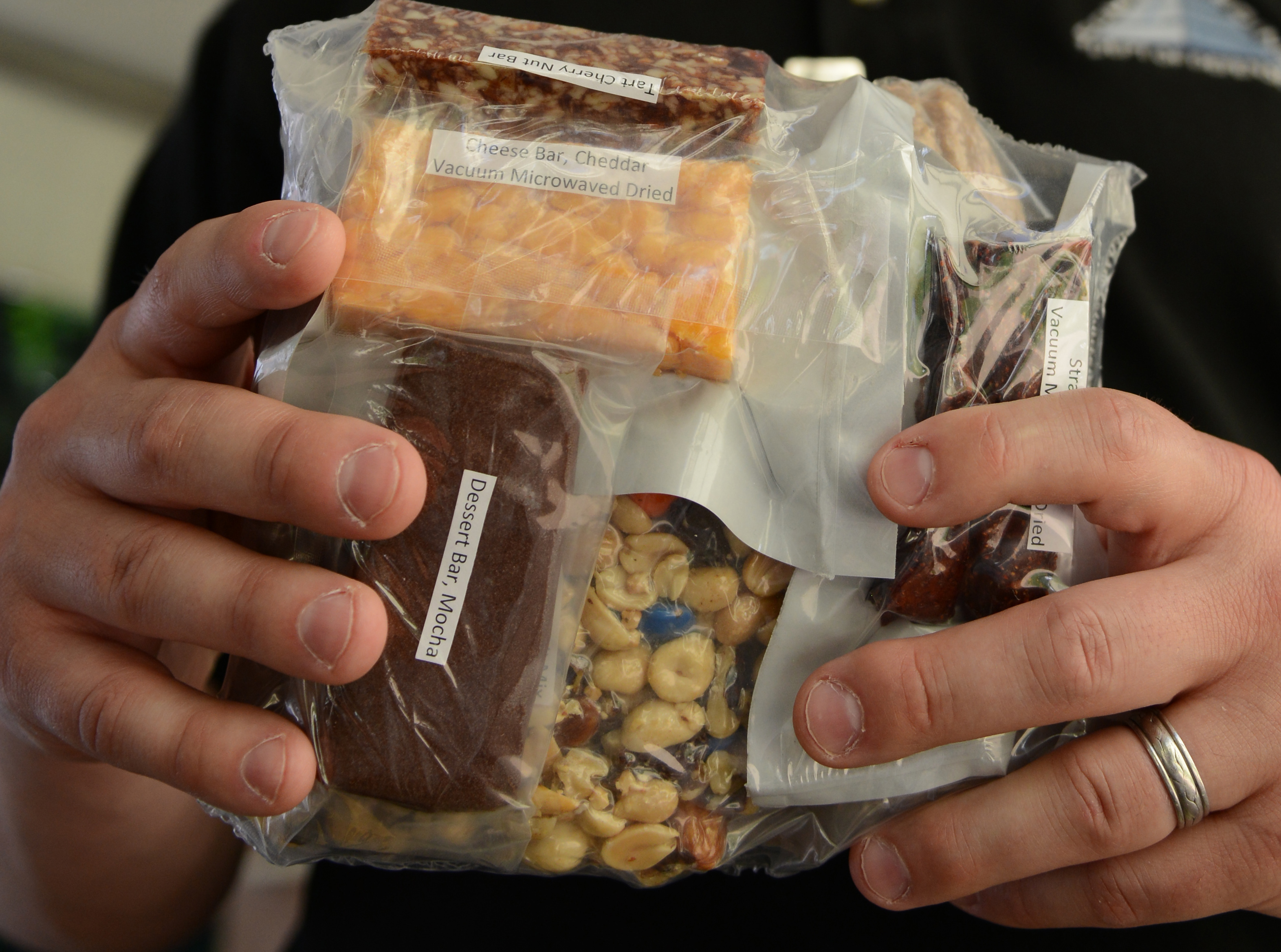
The prototype Close Combat Assault Ration unveiled in 2024

In 2021, CFD carried out testing of the CCAR with the 82nd Airborne Division at Fort Polk, Louisiana and the 2nd Light Armored Reconnaissance Battalion at Fort Pickett, Virginia. The evaluation tested soldiers' consumption of CCAR prototype for five days with no resupply.

In July 2025, following successful testing, full-scale deployment of the CCAR across all US military service branches for procurement through the Defense Logistics Agency (DLA) was approved .

Initial production was awarded to SOPAKCO Inc of Mullins, South Carolina on a $47,605,500 fixed-price, indefinite-delivery/indefinite-quantity contract.

== Features ==
The contents of one CCAR provide 2,800 kilocalories, enough food for an entire day in a mobile and combat intensive scenario. All components of it are eat on the move type foods that require little or no preparation. At launch there were three different menu options, Spaghetti with Beef and Sauce, Chicken Burrito Bowl, or Beef Stew.

The shelf life of the CCAR is 3 years at 80°F (27°C). It is shipped by the DLA in cases of 10, that weigh approximately 25 lbs (11.3 kg) each.

Menu options
Menu 1	Menu 2	Menu 3
Spaghetti with Beef and Sauce	Chicken Burrito Bowl, High Energy	Beef Stew, High Energy
Dried Cranberries	Lemon Pepper Tuna	Cookies and Cream High Energy Beverage
Teriyaki Meat Stick
Maple Glazed Pecan and Sea Salt Nut Bar	Chocolate Banana Nut Dessert Bar	Salted Caramel Marshmallow Crisp Recovery Bar
Coconut Almond High Energy Bar	Apple Pie Dessert Spread	Toffee Dessert Bar
Recovery Trail Mix with Pretzels	Almond and Coconut Nut Bar	Pepperoni Pizza Cheese Filled Crackers
Chocolate Chip Toaster Pastry	Nut and Raisin Mix with Pan Coated Choc Disks	Flavored Pan Coated Disks, Original
Smoked Almonds	Cherry Licorice Bites	Chocolate Chip Toaster Pastry
Whole Wheat Mini-Loaf Bread	Plain Tortillas	Plain Crackers
Peanut Butter	Cheddar Cheese Spread	Chocolate Peanut Spread
Grape Jelly	Oatmeal Cookie	Jalapeno Cashews
Chocolate Protein Drink	Lemon-Lime Carbohydrate Electrolyte Beverage Powder	Grape Carbohydrate Electrolyte Beverage Powder
Raspberry Energy Gel	Raspberry Energy Gel	Mocha Energy Gel
—N/a	Chocolate Energy Gel	—N/a
Picante Seasoning
Peppermint Caffeinated Chewing Gum
Toilet Tissue
Hand Wipe (2)
Re-closeable Interlocking Plastic Bag

== See also ==
- Meal, Ready-to-Eat
- First Strike Ration
- Military nutrition
