= First Strike Ration =

U.S. military compact assault ration

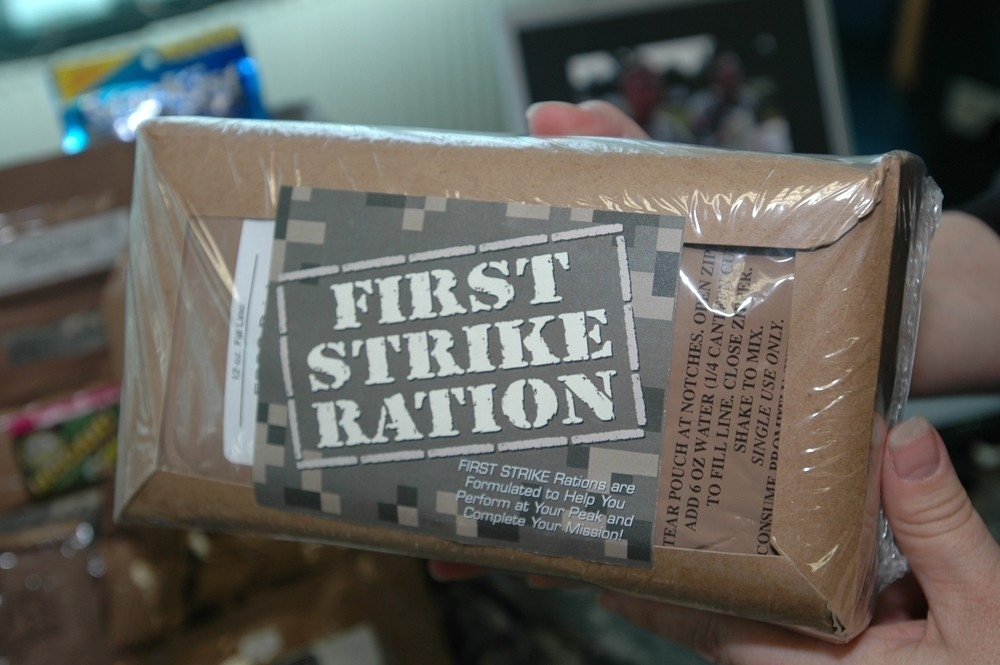
A First Strike Ration package

The First Strike Ration (FSR) is a compact assault United States military ration. It is designed to be consumed on the move during the first 72 hours of conflict. It was created by the United States Army Soldier Systems Center in Natick, Massachusetts. The U.S. Army said the FSR substantially reduces weight and load and is intended to enhance a consumer's physical performance, mental acuity, and mobility.

In July 2025, it was replaced by the Close Combat Assault Ration.

== Features ==
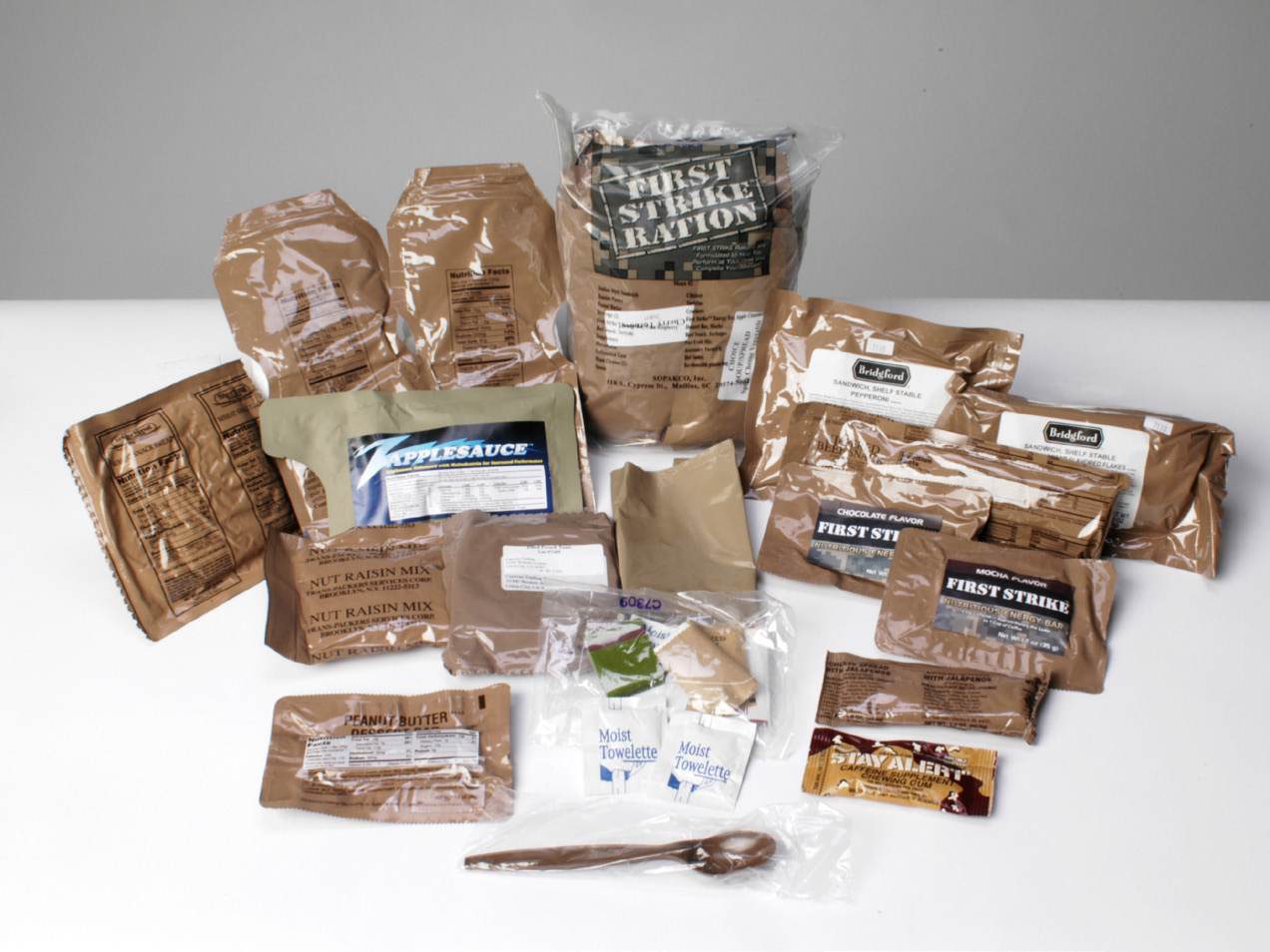
The components of a First Strike Ration

The FSR is designed to provide mobile soldiers with a variety of foods that are lightweight, calorically dense, familiar, and which are more "easy to consume" than intermediate moisture foods.

- Enhanced mobility – components are described as "familiar, performance-enhancing, eat-out-of-hand" foods that require little or no preparation by the soldier. The beverages are reconstituted (CamelBak compatible) and consumed right out of the pouch. No water is needed for food preparation, only for the beverage mix. The food takes the form of pocket sandwiches to be eaten by hand.
- Lightweight – when compared to three Meals, Ready-to-Eat, the FSR reduces the weight and volume of one day's subsistence by approximately 50%.
- Characteristics – has a minimum two-year shelf life at 80 °F (27 °C) and provides an average of 2,900 calories per day. The FSR has nine meals per shipping container consisting of three each of three different menus up through 2010. Since 2011 there are 9 different meal combinations per shipping container.
- Meals – Each pouch contains items for a breakfast, lunch, and a dinner, although there is no requirement to consume the items in any specific order.

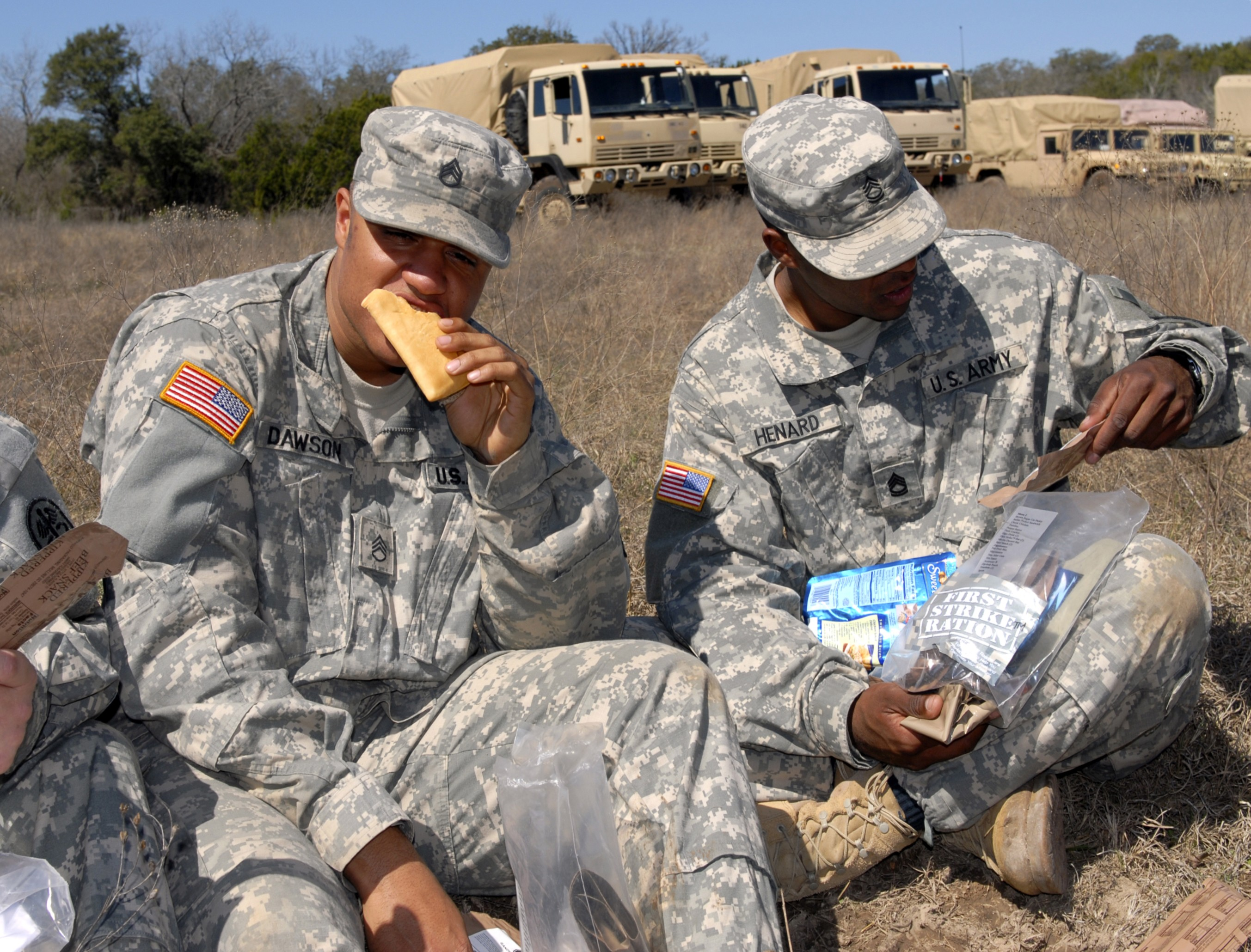
U.S. Army soldiers eating FSRs

A current Menu 1 ration contains:

- Filled French Toast
- Bacon Cheddar Breakfast Sandwich
- Pepperoni Pocket Sandwich
- Jalapeño Cheese Spread
- Wheat Snack Bread
- Dessert Bar, Peanut Butter
- First Strike Bar (HOOAH! Bar)
- Beef Snack, Teriyaki
- Beef Snack, BBQ
- Snack, Pretzels
- Zapplesauce, Cinnamon
- Nut Fruit Mix, Type III
- Chocolate Protein Drink Mix
- Beverage Base Powder
- Caffeine Gum
- Accessory Package

== See also ==
- Combat Ration One Man
- Military nutrition
- Ninja diet
