= Meal, Ready-to-Eat =

U.S. military individual field ration

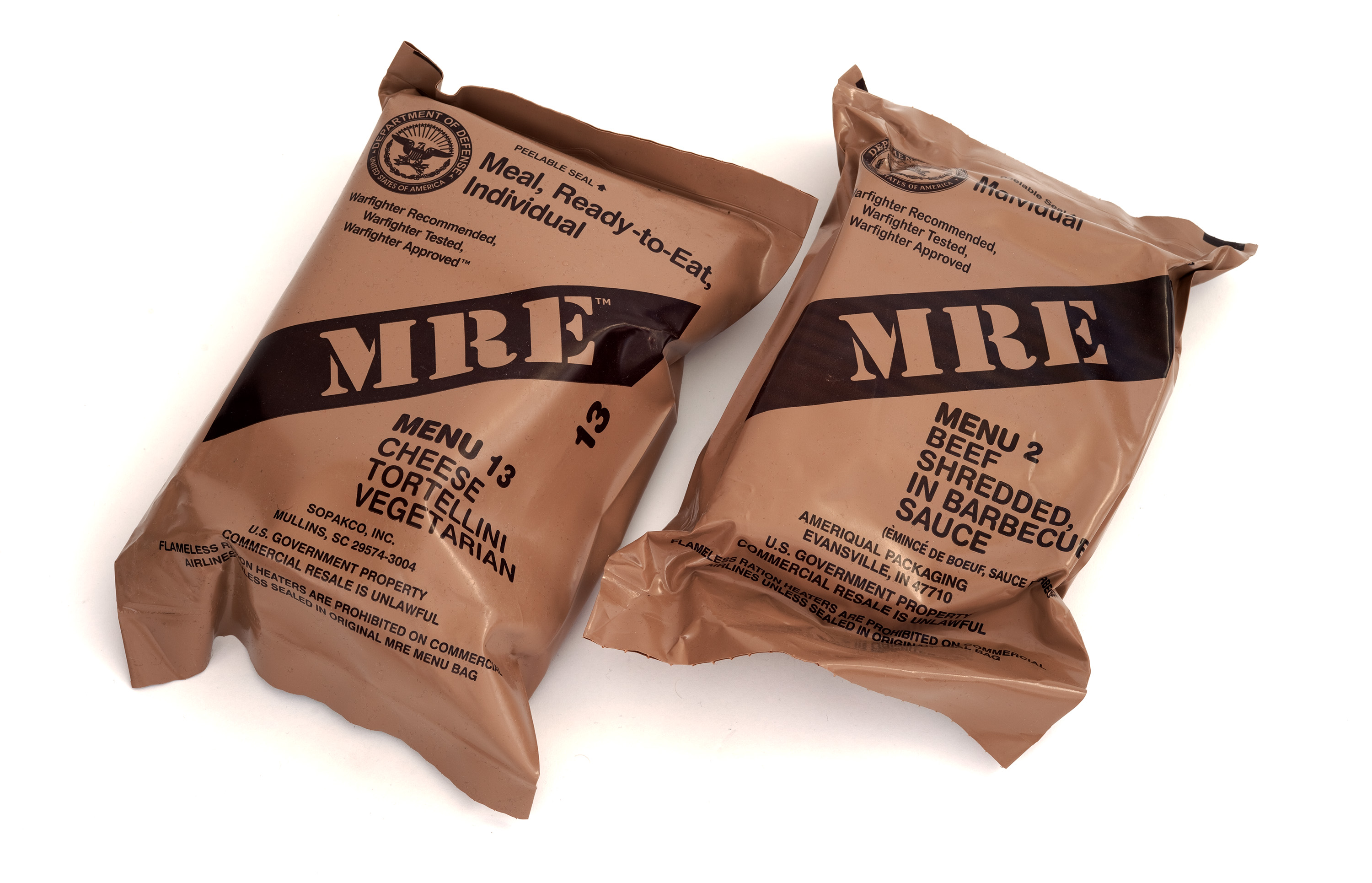
Menu 2, Shredded Beef, and Menu 13, Cheese Tortellini, from the 2019 series

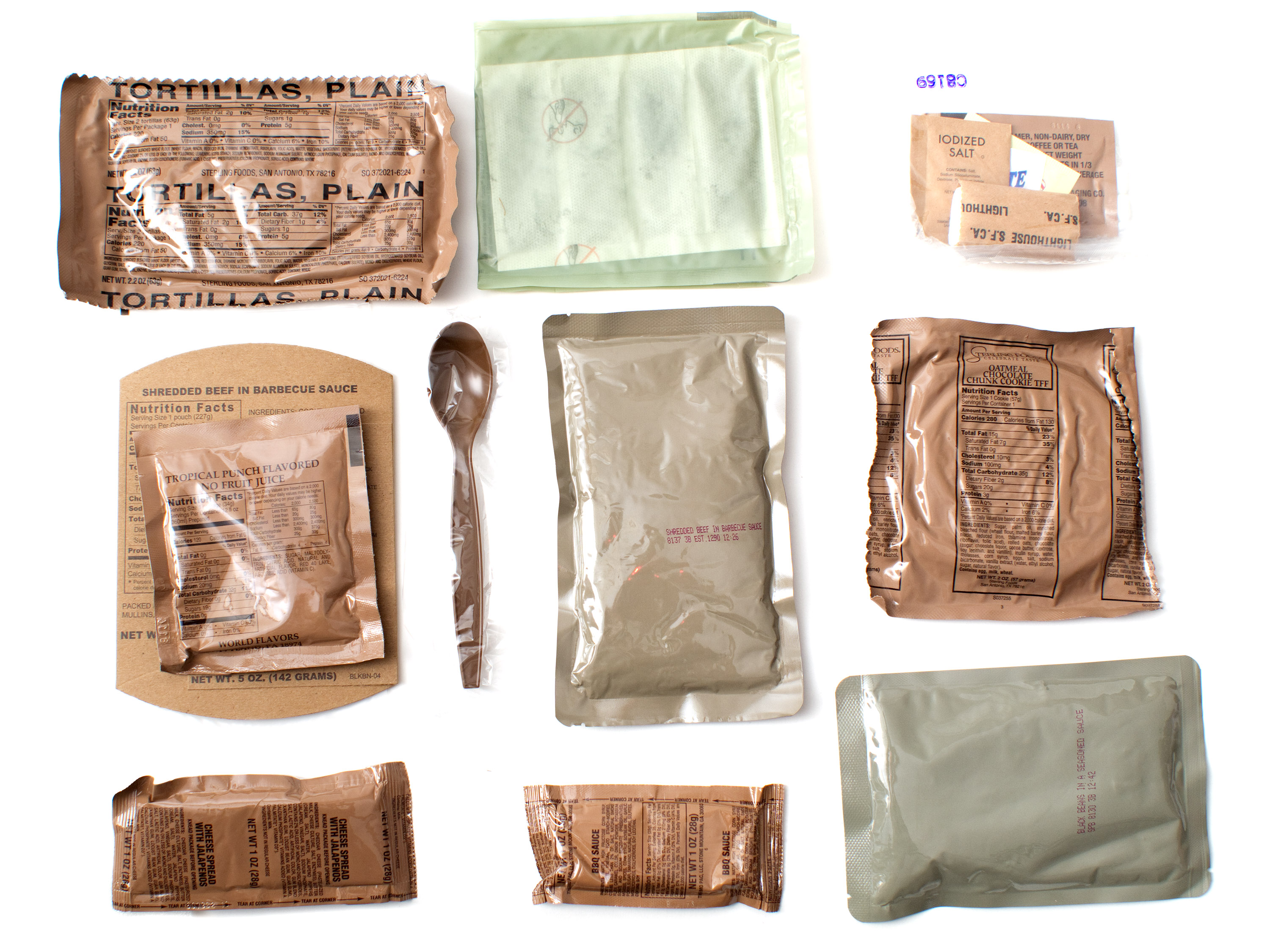
The contents of MRE Menu 2, Shredded Beef

The Meal, Ready-to-Eat (MRE) is a self-contained individual United States military ration used by the United States Armed Forces and Department of Defense. It is intended for use by American service members in combat or field conditions where other food is not available. MREs have also been distributed to civilians alongside humanitarian daily rations during natural disasters and wars.

The MRE replaced the canned Meal, Combat, Individual (MCI) in 1981. Its garrison ration and group ration equivalent is the Unitized Group Ration (UGR), its in-combat and mobile equivalent is the Close Combat Assault Ration (CCAR), and its long-range and cold weather equivalents are the Long Range Patrol (LRP) and Meal, Cold Weather (MCW) respectively.

== History ==
=== Predecessors ===
External videos
- "Comparing C-Rations to MREs Sgt. Neil Gussman" Archived May 19, 2023, at the Wayback Machine

The first American military ration established by a Congressional Resolution, during the Revolutionary War, consisted of enough food to feed a man for one day, mostly beef, peas, and rice. During the Civil War, the U.S. military moved toward canned goods. Later, self-contained kits were issued as a whole ration and contained canned meat, bread, coffee, sugar and salt. During World War I, canned meats were replaced with lightweight preserved meats (salted or dried) to save weight and allow more rations to be carried by soldiers on foot. At the beginning of World War II, a number of new field rations were introduced, including the Mountain ration and the Jungle ration. Cost-cutting measures by Quartermaster Command officials during the latter part of World War II and the Korean War again saw the predominance of heavy canned C-rations issued to troops, regardless of operating environment or mission. During World War II, over 100 million cans of Spam were sent to the Pacific. The use of canned wet rations continued through the Vietnam War, with the improved MCI.

During the Vietnam War, problems with the canned MCI rations become apparent. MCI cans were heavy and bulky; they could not fit easily in a uniform pocket and could even cause injury. The cans could also corrode in the tropical environment and cause the food to spoil. After the food was consumed, the empty cans were difficult to dispose of; the littered cans were sometimes fashioned into booby traps by the enemy. Finally, the MCI rations had an estimated shelf life of 24 months at 70 °F (21 °C), which was found to be inadequate as supply was often interrupted by weather and enemy activity.

=== Introduction ===
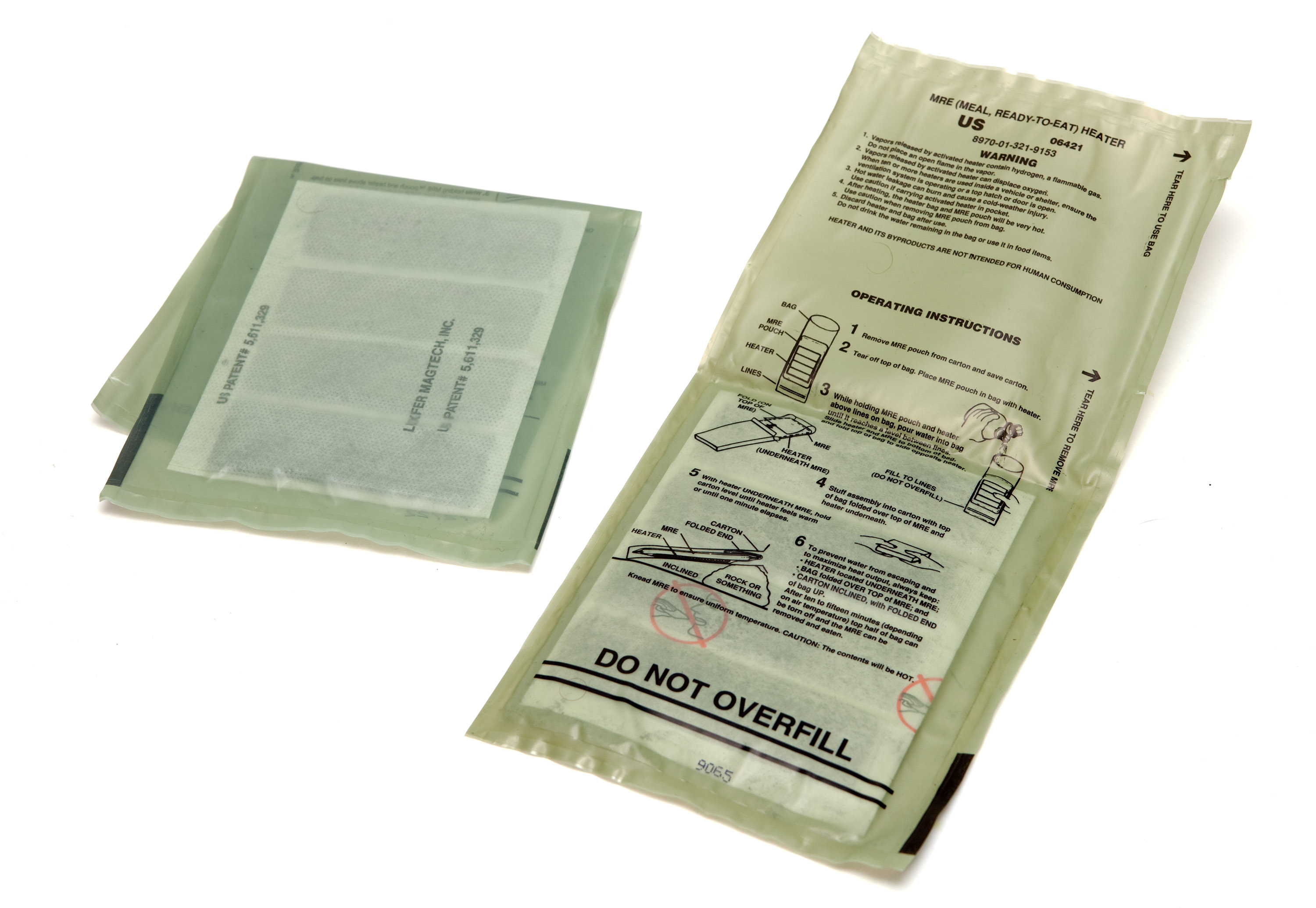
A pair of flameless ration heaters. The instructions advise that they should be rested against a "rock or something".

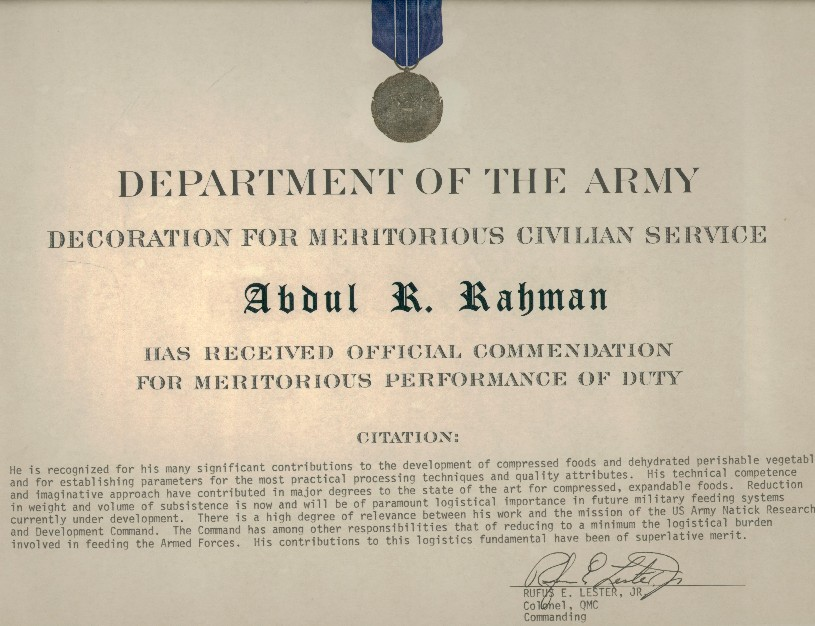
Meritorious Civilian Service Award presented to Abdul Rahman for leading development of the MRE

After repeated experiences with providing prepared rations to soldiers dating from before World War II, Pentagon officials ultimately realized that simply providing a nutritionally balanced meal in the field was not adequate. Service members in various geographic regions and combat situations often required different subsets of ingredients for food to be considered palatable over long periods. Catering to individual tastes and preferences would encourage service members to actually consume the whole ration and its nutrition. Most importantly, the use of specialized forces in extreme environments and the necessity of carrying increasingly heavy field loads while on foot during long missions required significantly lighter alternatives to standard canned wet rations.

In 1963, the DoD began developing the "Meal, Ready to Eat", a ration that would rely on modern food preparation and packaging technology to create a lighter replacement for the canned MCI. In 1966, this led to the Long Range Patrol, or LRP ration, a dehydrated meal stored in a waterproof canvas pouch. As with the Jungle ration, its expense compared to canned wet rations, as well as the costs of stocking and storing a specialized field ration, led to its limited usage and repeated attempts at discontinuance by Quartermaster Command officials.

Early MRE prototypes that involved freeze-dried and dehydrated foods were developed under Abdul Rahman, who later received the Meritorious Civilian Service Award for his work. Further work was needed to develop a ration that did not require re-hydration (thus not requiring additional preparation time and water). Further effort, led by Dr. Rauno A. Lampi, Chief of Food Systems Equipment Division at the Natick Soldier Research, Development and Engineering Center, concentrated on the refinement of the retort pouch to contain a wet ration with a three-to-ten year shelf life that could be easily shipped, carried in the field, opened and consumed straight out of the package if necessary with no further heat or water. The resulting MRE went into special issue starting in 1981 and standard issue in 1986, using a limited menu of twelve entrées.

Old "Brown Bag" MREs

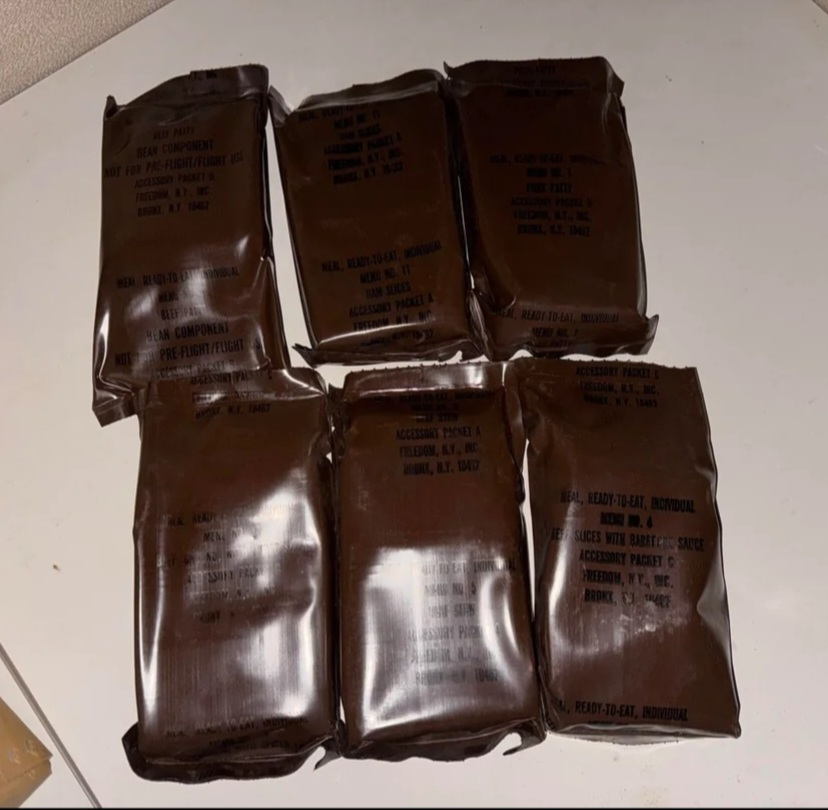
Old "Brown Bag" MREs from 1986

Rapper Shaggy with an old "brown bag" MRE during his service as a U.S. Marine in the Persian Gulf War.

=== Ongoing development ===
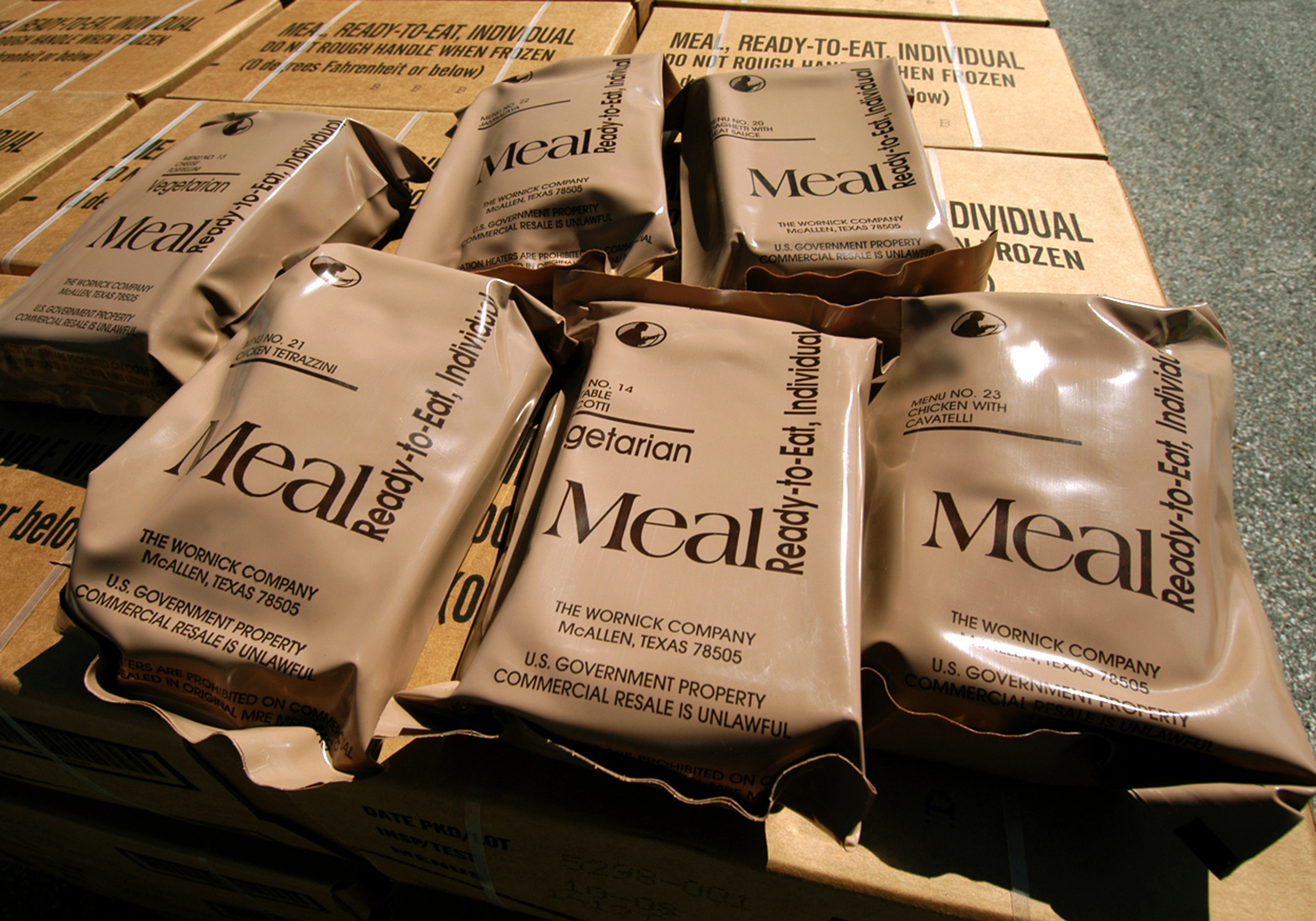
Several MREs on top of a pallet of MRE boxes

The MRE has been in continuous development since its introduction.

After the introduction of the MRE, service members often heated the food by boiling them in a canteen cup over a lit fuel source. This was slow, especially in cold weather. It also produced a visible flame that was undesirable at night. Service members strongly desired a more convenient way to heat the food. Between 1988 and 1989, development and testing was conducted for a new flameless ration heater. In 1990, the Flameless Ration Heater (FRH) was introduced. Service members activate a chemical reaction with a few ounces of water, which produces an exothermic reaction. An FRH was included with each meal beginning with the MRE XIII in 1993.

In an array of field tests and surveys, service members requested more entrée options and larger serving sizes. By 1994, commercial-like graphics were added to make the packets more user-friendly and appealing, while biodegradable materials were introduced for inedible components, such as spoons and napkins. The number of main dishes expanded to 16 by 1996 (including vegetarian options), 20 by 1997 and 24 by 1998. As of 2023, the system includes 24 entrées, and more than 150 additional items. The variety allows service members to trade them in order to find something palatable for various cultures and geographical regions.

The ration originally came in a dark brown outer bag from 1981 to 1995 because it was designed for service in the temperate forests and plains of central Europe. It was replaced in 1996 with a tan outer bag that was better suited for service in the deserts of the Middle East. By 2000, a bean burrito main dish was introduced. In 2006, "Beverage Bags" were introduced to the MRE, as service members have begun to depend more on hydration packs than on canteens, thus denying them the use of the metal canteen cups (shaped to fit in a canteen pouch with the canteen) for mixing powdered beverages. In addition to having measuring marks to indicate levels of liquid for precise measurement, they can be sealed and placed inside the flameless heater.

Most recently, MREs have been developed using the Dietary Reference Intake, created by the Institute of Medicine (IOM). The IOM indicated service members (who were classified as highly active men between the ages of 18 and 30) typically burn about 4,200 Calories (kcal) a day, but tended to only consume about 2,400 Calories a day during combat, entering a negative energy balance. This imbalance occurs when service members fail to consume full portions of their rations. Although manipulations to the food items and distribution of macronutrients to help boost the amount of kilocalories per MRE have been made, more studies are showing many service members still do not meet today's standards of daily consumption, often trading and discarding portions of the ration. Researchers continue to study the habits and eating preferences of service members, making constant changes that encourage service members to eat the entire meal and thus get full nutritional value. A small randomized controlled trial from 2017 confirms the nutritional balance of MRE eaten-in-whole using blood tests.

The military has experimented with new assault ration prototypes, such as the First Strike Ration and the HOOAH! Bar, designed with elite or specialized forces in mind. Lighter than the typical MRE, they require no preparation and allow service members to eat them while traveling. In July 2009, 6,300 dairy shake packets of varying flavors were recalled due to evidence of Salmonella contamination.

== Requirements ==
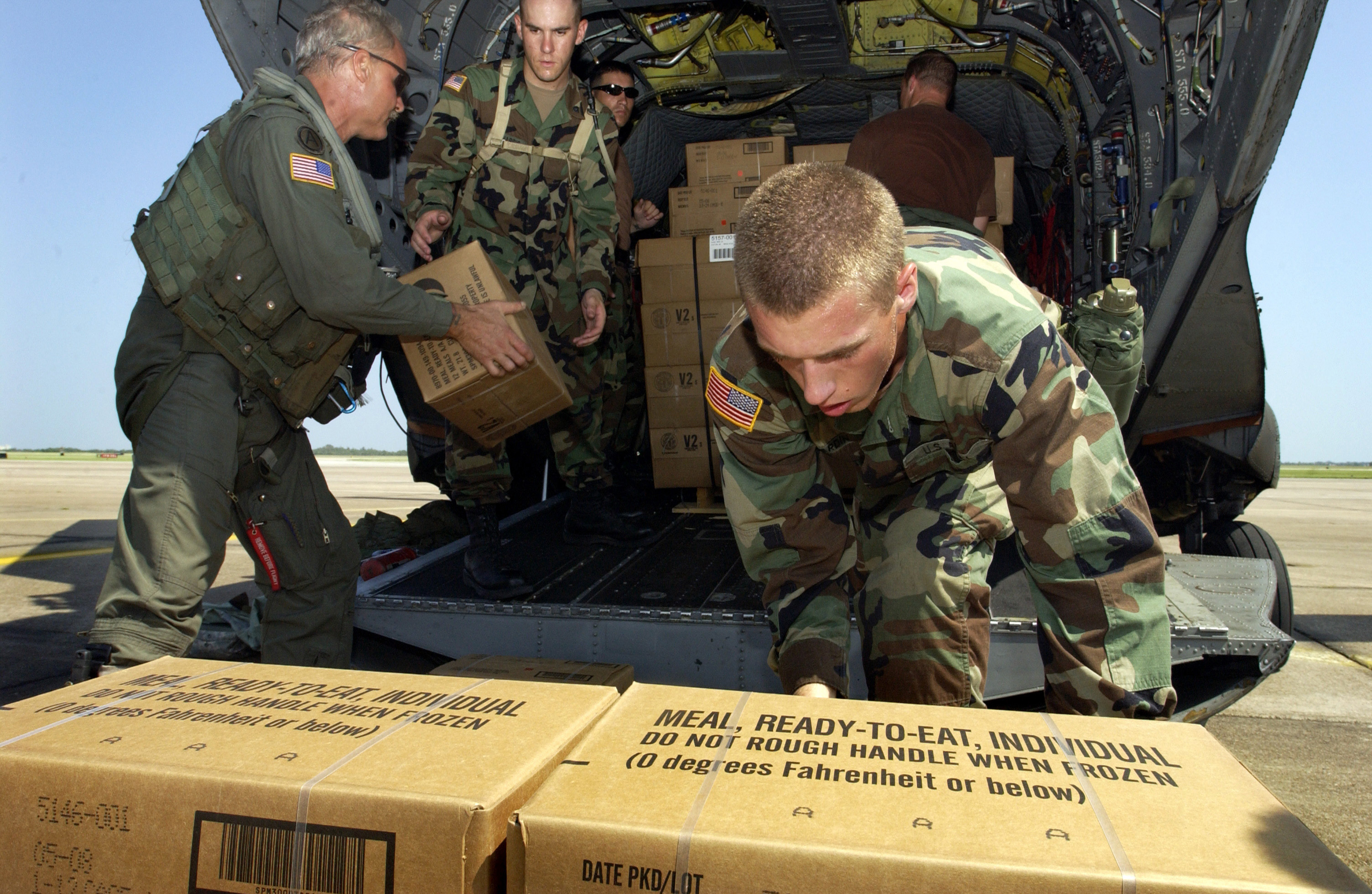
U.S. Army soldiers loading MREs onto a CH-47 Chinook helicopter in September 2005

Each meal provides about 1,200 kilocalories (5,000 kJ). They are intended to be eaten for a maximum of 21 days (the assumption is that logistics units can provide fresh food rations by then), and have a minimum shelf life of three years (depending on storage conditions).

Packaging requirements are strict. MREs must be able to withstand parachute drops from 380 metres (1,250 ft), and non-parachute drops of 30 metres (98 ft). The packaging is required to maintain a minimum shelf life of three and a half years at 27 °C (81 °F), nine months at 38 °C (100 °F), and short durations from −51 °C (−60 °F) to 49 °C (120 °F) must be sustainable. New forms of packaging are being considered to better meet these requirements including the use of zein to replace the foil, which can be easily punctured, conducts heat, and is reflective (which may give away a servicemember's position).

Each MRE weighs 510 to 740 grams (18 to 26 oz), depending on the menu. Since MREs contain water in the food, they weigh more than freeze-dried meals providing equivalent calories.

=== Resale status ===
As a result of earlier unauthorized sales to civilians, the Department of Defense requires that "U.S. Government Property, Commercial Resale is Unlawful" be printed on each case of MREs. The warning is only intended for service members, as there are no laws that forbid the resale of MREs by civilians. Although the government has attempted to discourage sellers from selling MREs, auction sites such as eBay have continued to allow auctions of the MREs because the Department of Defense has been unable to provide any regulations or laws specifically outlawing the practice. According to a spokesman for eBay, "until a law is passed saying you can't sell these things, we're not going to stop them from being sold on the site." Therefore, while MREs are not prima facie contraband, the procurement and sale of MREs by military personnel for personal profit is illegal under the Uniform Code of Military Justice Article 108. As a result, MREs found for sale outside reputable vendors often fall into a grey market where the question of how it entered civilian hands (through theft/legitimate means) and/or its quality may be unknown.

An investigation conducted in 2006 on behalf of the U.S. Government Accountability Office (GAO) determined multiple instances where sellers on eBay may have improperly obtained MREs and sold them to the public for private gain. As military MREs are procured at taxpayers' expense, they are intended to be consumed by individuals from authorized organizations and activities. Consequently, "if military MREs are sold to the general public on eBay, then they are clearly not reaching their intended recipients and represent a waste of taxpayer dollars and possible criminal activity." Further, MREs found on eBay are typically older and closer to their expiration date, having been sourced in "neighborhood yard sales" and "Marine base dumpsters".

The growth of MREs listed on eBay in 2005 resulted in a government investigation of whether they were intended for Hurricane Katrina victims, and the news media nickname "Meals Ready for eBay". Some cases were being sold from Louisiana, Mississippi, Florida and other Gulf states affected by Katrina. The internal cost of a 12 pack case of MREs is $86.98 (approx. $7.25 a meal) to the government, much higher than what is paid to vendors. MREs can be purchased by civilians directly from the contractors who supply MREs to the U.S. government. These MREs usually omit the flameless ration heater and have other minor differences (i.e., design of case and bag or type of spoon), but otherwise are often very similar to genuine U.S. government MREs.

While MRE boxes say resale is unlawful, it is legal to buy them if they were sold as surplus. On the low end they can be bought for $2 to $3 off government auction sites like Gov Planet.

In the Philippines, the government stopped MREs from being sold in local markets in 2013.

== Contents ==
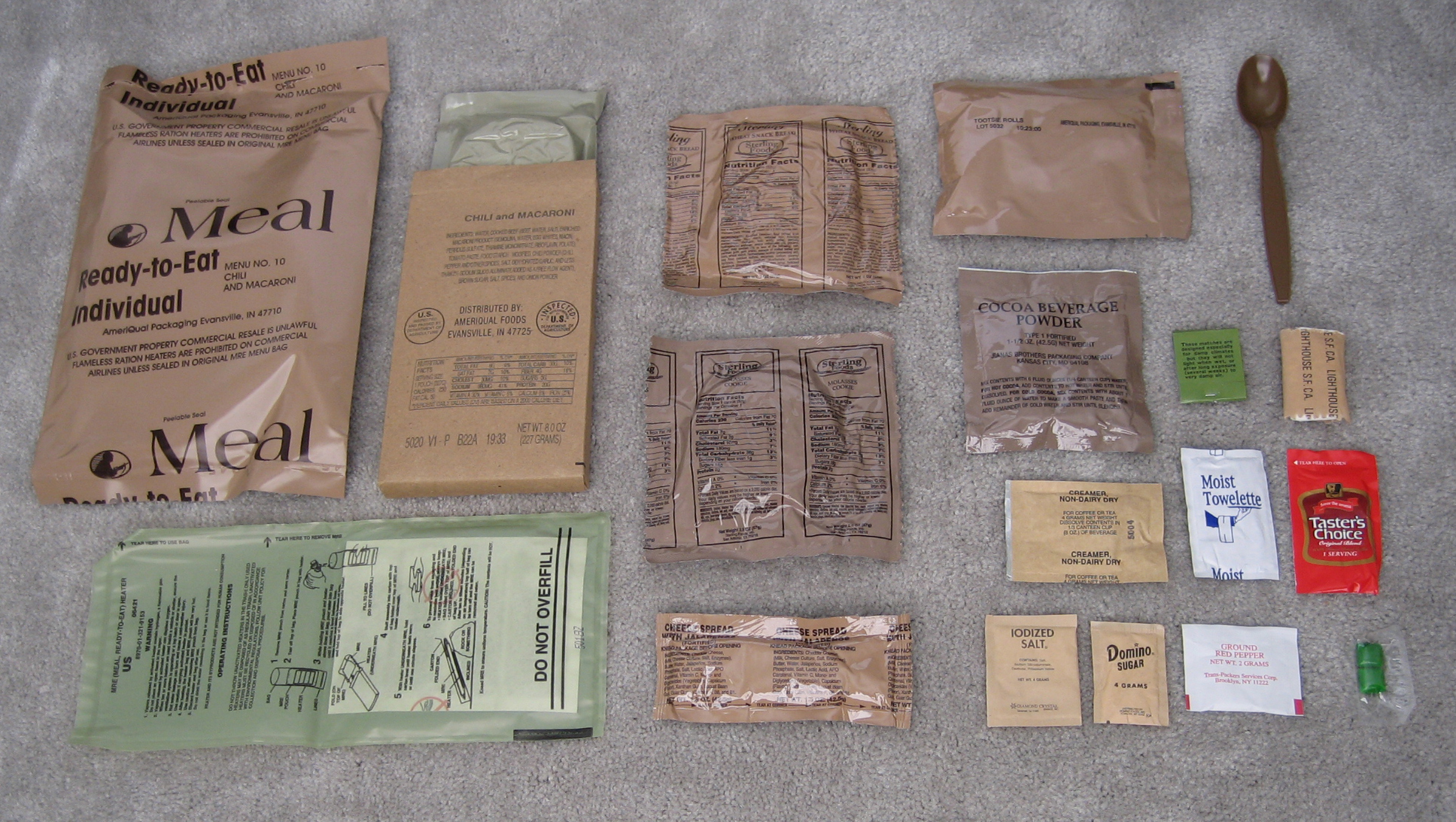
The contents of an MRE, including a main course, side dish, bread, dessert, and flameless ration heater, among other items

The general contents of an MRE typically include:

- Main course (often referred to as "the main")
- Side dish
- Dessert or snack (often commercial candy, fortified pastry, First Strike Bar, or Soldier Fuel)
- Crackers or bread
- Cheese spread, peanut butter, or jelly
- Powdered beverage mix (commonly a fruit-flavored drink, cocoa, protein drink powder, instant coffee or tea, sport drink, or dairy shake)
- Utensils (commonly just a plastic spoon, though rarely a fork and knife may also be given)
- Flameless ration heater
- Beverage mixing bag
- Accessory pack:
  - Xylitol chewing gum
  - Water-resistant matchbook
  - Napkin / toilet paper
  - Moist towelette
  - Seasonings, including salt, pepper, sugar, creamer, and/or Tabasco sauce
  - Freeze-dried coffee powder

Many items are fortified with nutrients. In addition, DoD policy requires units to augment MREs with fresh food whenever feasible, especially in training environments.

=== Changes in menus ===
To make MREs more palatable to service members and match ever-changing trends in popular tastes, the military is constantly seeking feedback to adjust MRE menus and ingredients. In the following list, only main entrees are listed. Vegetarian menus are marked and footnoted on their first appearance. (Note: Vegetarian menu, only first appearance footnoted)

Menus 1981 to 1997
#	MRE I – VII (1981–87)	MRE VIII – XII (1988–92)	MRE XIII – XIV (1993–94)	MRE XV (1995)	MRE XVI (1996)	MRE XVII (1997)
1	Pork Patty	Pork w/ Rice in BBQ Sauce	Pork w/ Rice in BBQ Sauce	Pork w/ Rice in BBQ Sauce	Beef Steak	Beef Steak
2	Ham & Chicken loaf	Corned Beef Hash	Corned Beef Hash	Chili w/ Macaroni	Tuna w/ Noodles	Boneless Pork Chop w/ Noodles
3	Beef Patty (nicknamed "Hockey Puck")	Chicken Stew	Chicken Stew	Chicken Stew	Chicken Stew	Chicken Stew
4	Beef slices in BBQ sauce	Omelet with Ham	Omelet with Ham	Grilled Chicken	Ham Slice	Ham Slice
5	Beef Stew	Spaghetti w/ Meat Sauce	Spaghetti w/ Meat Sauce	Spaghetti w/ Meat Sauce	Spaghetti w/ Meat Sauce	Chicken w/ Noodles
6	Frankfurters w/ Beans (nicknamed "Four Fingers of Death")	Chicken a la King	Smokey Franks	Smokey Franks	Smokey Franks	Smokey Franks
7	Turkey Diced w/ Gravy (nicknamed "Wild Turkey Surprise")	Beef Stew	Beef Stew	Beef Stew	Beef Stew	Pork Chow Mein
8	Beef Diced w/ Gravy	Ham Slice	Ham Slice	Ham Slice	Chicken w/ Rice	Chicken w/ Rice
9	Chicken à la King	Meatballs w/ Tomato Sauce	Pork Chow Mein	Pork Chow Mein	Pork Chow Mein	Beef Stew
10	Meatballs & BBQ sauce	Tuna w/ Noodles	Tuna w/ Noodles	Tuna w/ Noodles	Chili w/ Macaroni	Chili w/ Macaroni
11	Ham slices	Chicken w/ Rice	Chicken w/ Rice	Chicken w/ Rice	Pasta w/ Vegetables	
12	Ground Beef w/ Spiced Sauce	Escalloped Potatoes w/ Ham	Escalloped Potatoes w/ Ham	Escalloped Potatoes w/ Ham	Cheese Tortellini	Cheese Tortellini
13	Chicken Loaf (12B; discontinued 1986)				Pork w/ Rice	Pork w/ Rice
14	Beefsteak (9B; discontinued 1985)				Chicken Parmesan	Chicken Parmesan
15					Grilled Chicken	Grilled Chicken
16					Escalloped Potatoes w/ Ham	Tuna w/ Noodles
17						Beef Ravioli
18						Turkey Breast w/ Gravy & Potatoes
19						Beef w/ Mushrooms
20						Spaghetti w/ Meat Sauce

Menus 1998 to 2003
#	MRE XVIII (1998)	MRE XIX (1999)	MRE XX (2000)	MRE XXI (2001)	MRE XXII (2002)	MRE XXIII (2003)
1	Beef Steak	Beef Steak	Grilled Beefsteak	Grilled Beefsteak	Beefsteak w/ Mushrooms	Beefsteak w/ Mushrooms
2	Boneless Pork Chop w/ Noodles	Boneless Pork Jamaican	Boneless Pork Chop	Boneless Pork Chop	Jamaican Pork Chop w/ Noodles	Pork Rib
3	Chicken Stew	Beef Teriyaki	Beef Teriyaki	Beef Ravioli	Beef Ravioli	Beef Ravioli
4	Ham Slice	Ham Slice	Country Captain Chicken (nicknamed "KKK")	Country Captain Chicken	Country Captain Chicken	Country Captain Chicken
5	Chicken w/ Noodles	Grilled Chicken Breast	Grilled Chicken Breast	Grilled Chicken Breast	Grilled Chicken Breast	Chicken Breast
6	Grilled Chicken	Chicken w/ Noodles	Chicken w/ Noodles	Chicken w/ Thai Sauce	Chicken w/ Thai Sauce	Chicken w/ Thai Sauce
7	Pork Chow Mein	Chicken w/ Salsa	Chicken w/ Salsa	Chicken w/ Salsa	Chicken w/ Salsa	Chicken w/ Salsa
8	Chicken w/ Rice	Chicken w/ Rice	Chicken and Rice	Chicken and Rice	Beef Patty	Beef Patty
9	Beef Stew	Beef Stew	Beef Stew	Beef Stew	Beef Stew	Beef Stew
10	Chili w/ Macaroni	Chili w/ Macaroni	Chili and Macaroni	Chili and Macaroni	Chili and Macaroni	Chili and Macaroni
11	Pasta w/ Vegetables	Pasta w/ Vegetables in Tomato Sauce	Pasta w/ Vegetables in Tomato Sauce	Pasta w/ Vegetables in Tomato Sauce	Pasta w/ Vegetables in Tomato Sauce	Pasta w/ Vegetables in Tomato Sauce
12	Cheese Tortellini	Rice & Bean Burrito	Rice & Bean Burrito	Rice & Bean Burrito	Rice & Bean Burrito	Black Bean & Rice Burrito
13	Thai Chicken	Cheese Tortellini	Cheese Tortellini	Cheese Tortellini	Cheese Tortellini	Cheese Tortellini
14	Chicken w/ Cavatelli	Pasta w/ Vegetables in Alfredo Sauce	Pasta w/ Vegetables in Alfredo Sauce	Pasta w/ Vegetables in Alfredo Sauce	Pasta w/ Vegetables in Alfredo Sauce	Manicotti w/ Vegetables
15	Beef Franks	Beef Franks	Beef Frankfurters	Beef Enchilada	Beef Enchilada	Beef Enchiladas
16	Bean & Rice Burrito	Chicken w/ Thai Sauce	Thai Chicken	Chicken w/ Noodles	Chicken w/ Noodles	Chicken w/ Noodles
17	Beef Ravioli	Beef Ravioli	Beef Ravioli	Beef Teriyaki	Beef Teriyaki	Beef Teriyaki
18	Turkey Breast w/ Gravy & Potatoes	Turkey Breast w/ Gravy & Potatoes	Turkey Breast w/ Gravy & Potatoes	Turkey Breast w/ Gravy & Potatoes	Turkey Breast w/ Gravy & Potatoes	Turkey Breast w/ Gravy & Potatoes
19	Beef w/ Mushrooms	Beef w/ Mushrooms	Beef w/ Mushrooms	Beef w/ Mushrooms	Beef w/ Mushrooms	Roast Beef
20	Spaghetti w/ Meat Sauce	Spaghetti w/ Meat Sauce	Spaghetti w/ Meat Sauce	Spaghetti w/ Meat Sauce	Spaghetti w/ Meat Sauce	Spaghetti w/ Meat Sauce
21	Beef Teriyaki	Chicken Stew	Chicken Tetrazzini	Chicken Tetrazzini	Chicken Tetrazzini	Chicken Tetrazzini
22	Chicken w/ Salsa	Pork Chow Mein	Pork Chow Mein	Jambalaya	Jambalaya	Jambalaya
23	Meat Loaf w/ Gravy	Chicken w/ Cavatelli	Chicken w/ Cavatelli	Chicken w/ Cavatelli	Chicken w/ Cavatelli	Chicken w/ Cavatelli
24	Pasta w/ Alfredo Sauce	Meat Loaf w/ Gravy	Meat Loaf w/ Gravy	Meat Loaf w/ Gravy	Meat Loaf w/ Gravy	Meat Loaf w/ Gravy

Menus 2004 to 2009
#	MRE XXIV (2004)	MRE XXV (2005)	MRE XXVI (2006)	MRE XXVII (2007)	MRE XXVIII (2008)	MRE XXIX (2009)
1	Beef Steak	Beef Steak	Chili w/ Beans	Chili w/ Beans	Chili w/ Beans	Chili w/ Beans
2	Pork Rib	Pork Rib	Pork Rib	Pork Rib	Pork Rib	Pork Rib
3	Beef Ravioli	Beef Ravioli	Beef Ravioli	Beef Ravioli	Beef Ravioli	Beef Ravioli
4	Country Captain Chicken	Cheese & Vegetable Omelet	Cheese & Vegetable Omelet	Cheese & Vegetable Omelet	Cheese & Vegetable Omelet	Maple Sausage
5	Grilled Chicken Breast	Chicken Breast	Chicken Breast	Chicken Breast	Chicken Breast	Chicken Breast
6	Chicken w/ Thai Sauce	Chicken Fajitas	Chicken Fajitas	Chicken Fajitas	Chicken w/ Noodles	Chicken w/ Noodles
7	Chicken w/ Salsa	Chicken w/ Salsa	Chicken w/ Salsa	Chicken w/ Salsa	Meatloaf w/ Gravy	Beef Brisket
8	Beef Patty	Beef Patty	Beef Patty	Beef Patty	Beef Patty	Beef Patty
9	Beef Stew	Beef Stew	Beef Stew	Beef Stew	Beef Stew	Beef Stew
10	Chili and Macaroni	Chili and Macaroni	Tuna	Tuna in Pouch	Chili and Macaroni	Chili and Macaroni
11	Pasta w/ Vegetables in Tomato Sauce	Pasta w/ Vegetables in Tomato Sauce	Spicy Penne Pasta	Vegetable Manicotti	Vegetable Lasagna	Vegetable Lasagna
12	Veggie Burger w/ BBQ Sauce	Veggie Burger w/ BBQ Sauce	Veggie Burger w/ BBQ Sauce	Veggie Burger w/ BBQ Sauce	Veggie Burger w/ BBQ Sauce	Veggie Burger w/ BBQ Sauce
13	Cheese Tortellini	Cheese Tortellini	Cheese Tortellini	Cheese Tortellini	Cheese Tortellini	Cheese Tortellini
14	Manicotti w/ Vegetables	Manicotti w/ Vegetable	Manicotti w/ Vegetable	Spicy Penne Pasta w/ Vegetarian Sausage	Spicy Penne Pasta w/ Vegetarian Sausage	Spicy Penne Pasta w/ Vegetarian Sausage
15	Beef Enchiladas	Beef Enchiladas	Beef Enchiladas	Beef Enchiladas	Beef Enchiladas	Beef Enchiladas
16	Chicken w/ Noodles	Chicken w/ Noodles	Chicken w/ Noodles	Chicken Fajita	Chicken Fajita	Chicken Fajita
17	Beef Teriyaki	Sloppy Joe Filling	Sloppy Joe	Sloppy Joe Filling	Sloppy Joe Filling	Sloppy Joe Filling
18	Cajun Rice, Beans & Sausage	Cajun Rice & Sausage	Cajun Rice, Beans, & Sausage	Meatballs w/ Marinara	Meatballs w/ Marinara	Meatballs w/ Marinara
19	Roast Beef	Roast Beef w/ Vegetables	Roast Beef w/ Vegetables	Pot Roast w/ Vegetables	Pot Roast w/ Vegetables	Pot Roast w/ Vegetables
20	Spaghetti w/ Meat Sauce	Spaghetti w/ Meat Sauce	Spaghetti w/ Meat Sauce	Spaghetti w/ Meat Sauce	Spaghetti w/ Meat Sauce	Spaghetti w/ Meat Sauce
21	Chicken Tetrazzini	Chicken Tetrazzini	Chicken Tetrazzini	Chili & Macaroni	Tuna in Pouch	Tuna in Pouch
22	Jambalaya	Jambalaya	Jambalaya	Chicken w/ Dumplings	Chicken w/ Dumplings	Chicken w/ Dumplings
23	Chicken w/ Cavatelli	Chicken w/ Cavatelli	Chicken w/ Cavatelli	Chicken w/ Cavatelli	Chicken Pesto & Pasta	Chicken Pesto & Pasta
24	Meat Loaf w/ Gravy	Meat Loaf w/ Gravy	Meat Loaf w/ Gravy	Meat Loaf w/ Gravy	Chicken w/ Salsa	Buffalo Chicken

Menus 2010 to 2015
#	MRE XXX (2010)	MRE XXXI (2011)	MRE XXXII (2012)	MRE XXXIII (2013)	MRE XXXIV (2014)	MRE XXXV (2015)
1	Chili w/ Beans	Chili w/ Beans	Chili w/ Beans	Chili w/ Beans	Chili w/ Beans	Chili w/ Beans
2	Pork Rib	Chicken Fajita	Chicken Fajita	Chicken Fajita	Shredded BBQ Beef	Shredded BBQ Beef
3	Beef Ravioli	Beef Ravioli	Chicken with Noodles	Chicken with Noodles	Chicken with Noodles	Chicken with Noodles
4	Maple Sausage	Maple Sausage	Pork Sausage w/ Gravy	Pork Sausage w/ Gravy	Spaghetti w/ Meat Sauce	Spaghetti w/ Meat Sauce
5	Mediterranean Chicken	Mediterranean Chicken	Chicken, Tomato, Feta	Mediterranean Chicken	Mediterranean Chicken	Diced Chicken
6	Chicken w/ Noodles	Beef Patty	Beef Roast w/ Vegetables	Beef Taco	Beef Taco	Beef Taco
7	Beef Brisket	Beef Brisket	Beef Brisket	Beef Brisket	Beef Brisket	Beef Brisket
8	Meatballs w/ Marinara Sauce	Meatballs w/ Marinara Sauce	Meatballs w/ Marinara Sauce	Meatballs w/ Marinara Sauce	Meatballs w/ Marinara Sauce	Meatballs w/ Marinara Sauce
9	Beef Stew	Beef Stew	Beef Stew	Beef Stew	Beef Stew	Beef Stew
10	Chili and Macaroni	Chili and Macaroni	Chili and Macaroni	Chili and Macaroni	Chili and Macaroni	Chili and Macaroni
11	Vegetable Lasagna	Vegetable Lasagna	Vegetable Lasagna	Vegetable Lasagna	Vegetarian Taco Pasta	Vegetarian Taco Pasta
12	Veggie Burger w/ BBQ Sauce	Spicy Penne Pasta	Spicy Penne Pasta	Spicy Penne Pasta	Spicy Penne Pasta	Spicy Penne Pasta
13	Cheese Tortellini	Cheese Tortellini	Cheese Tortellini	Cheese Tortellini	Cheese Tortellini	Cheese Tortellini
14	Spicy Penne Pasta w/ Vegetarian Sausage	Ratatouille	Ratatouille	Ratatouille	Ratatouille	Ratatouille
15	Southwest Beef & Black Beans	Southwest Beef & Black Beans	Mexican Style Chicken Stew	Mexican Style Chicken Stew	Mexican Style Chicken Stew	Mexican Style Chicken Stew
16	Chicken Fajita	Pork Rib	Pork Rib	Pork Rib	Pork Rib	Pork Rib
17	Sloppy Joe	Pork Sausage w/ Gravy	Maple Sausage	Maple Sausage	Maple Sausage	Maple Sausage
18	Beef Patty	Chicken w/ Noodles	Beef Ravioli	Beef Ravioli	Beef Ravioli	Beef Ravioli
19	Beef Roast w/ Vegetables	Beef Roast w/ Vegetables	Sloppy Joe	Jalapeno Pepper Jack Beef Patty	Jalapeno Pepper Jack Beef Patty	Jalapeno Pepper Jack Beef Patty
20	Spaghetti w/ Meat Sauce	Spaghetti w/ Meat Sauce	Spaghetti w/ Meat Sauce	Spaghetti w/ Meat Sauce	Pork Sausage w/ Gravy	Hash Brown Potatoes w/ Bacon
21	Tuna	Lemon Pepper Tuna	Lemon Pepper Tuna	Lemon Pepper Tuna	Lemon Pepper Tuna	Lemon Pepper Tuna
22	Chicken and Dumplings	Sloppy Joe	Asian Beef Strips	Asian Beef Strips	Asian Beef Strips	Asian Style Beef Strips w/ Peppers
23	Chicken Pesto Pasta	Chicken Pesto Pasta	Chicken Pesto Pasta	Chicken Pesto Pasta	Chicken Pesto Pasta	Chicken Pesto Pasta
24	Buffalo Chicken	Buffalo Chicken	Southwest Beef and Black Beans	Southwest Beef and Black Beans	Southwest Beef and Black Beans	Southwest Beef and Black Beans

Menus 2016 to 2020
#	MRE XXXVI (2016)	MRE XXXVII (2017)	MRE XXXVIII (2018)	MRE XXXIX (2019)	MRE XL (2020)
1	Chili w/ Beans	Chili w/ Beans	Chili w/ Beans	Chili w/ Beans	Chili w/ Beans
2	Shredded BBQ Beef	Shredded BBQ Beef	Shredded BBQ Beef	Shredded BBQ Beef	Shredded BBQ Beef
3	Chicken w/ Egg Noodles & Vegetables	Chicken w/ Egg Noodles & Vegetables	Chicken w/ Egg Noodles & Vegetables	Chicken w/ Egg Noodles & Vegetables	Chicken w/ Egg Noodles & Vegetables
4	Spaghetti w/ Meat Sauce	Spaghetti w/ Meat Sauce	Spaghetti w/ Meat Sauce	Spaghetti w/ Meat Sauce	Spaghetti w/ Meat Sauce
5	Chili and Macaroni	Chicken Chunks	Chicken Chunks	Chicken Chunks	Chicken Chunks
6	Beef Taco	Beef Taco	Beef Taco	Beef Taco	Beef Taco
7	Beef Brisket	Beef Brisket	Beef Brisket	Beef Brisket	Beef Brisket
8	Meatballs w/ Marinara Sauce	Meatballs w/ Marinara Sauce	Meatballs w/ Marinara Sauce	Meatballs w/ Marinara Sauce	Meatballs w/ Marinara Sauce
9	Beef Stew	Beef Stew	Beef Stew	Beef Stew	Beef Stew
10	Chicken Chunks	Chili and Macaroni	Chili and Macaroni	Chili and Macaroni	Chili and Macaroni
11	Vegetarian Taco Pasta	Vegetarian Taco Pasta	Vegetarian Taco Pasta	Vegetarian Taco Pasta	Vegetarian Taco Pasta
12	Elbow Macaroni and Tomato Sauce	Elbow Macaroni and Tomato Sauce	Elbow Macaroni and Tomato Sauce	Elbow Macaroni and Tomato Sauce	Elbow Macaroni and Tomato Sauce
13	Cheese Tortellini	Cheese Tortellini	Cheese Tortellini	Cheese Tortellini	Cheese Tortellini
14	Spinach Mushrooms & Cream Sauce Fettuccine	Spinach Mushrooms & Cream Sauce Fettuccine	Spinach Mushrooms & Cream Sauce Fettuccine	Spinach Mushrooms & Cream Sauce Fettuccine	Spinach Mushrooms & Cream Sauce Fettuccine
15	Maple Sausage	Mexican Style Chicken Stew	Mexican Style Chicken Stew	Mexican Style Chicken Stew	Mexican Style Chicken Stew
16	Pork Rib	Chicken Burrito Bowl	Chicken Burrito Bowl	Chicken Burrito Bowl	Chicken Burrito Bowl
17	Mexican Style Chicken Stew	Maple Sausage	Maple Sausage	Maple Sausage	Maple Sausage
18	Beef Ravioli	Beef Ravioli	Beef Ravioli	Beef Ravioli	Beef Ravioli
19	Jalapeno Pepper Jack Beef Patty	Jalapeno Pepper Jack Beef Patty	Jalapeno Pepper Jack Beef Patty	Jalapeno Pepper Jack Beef Patty	Jalapeno Pepper Jack Beef Patty
20	Hash Brown Potatoes w/ Bacon	Hash Brown Potatoes w/ Bacon	Hash Brown Potatoes w/ Bacon	Hash Brown Potatoes w/ Bacon	Italian Sausage w/ Vegetables
21	Lemon Pepper Tuna	Lemon Pepper Tuna	Lemon Pepper Tuna	Lemon Pepper Tuna	Lemon Pepper Tuna
22	Asian Style Beef Strips w/ Vegetables	Asian Style Beef Strips w/ Vegetables	Asian Style Beef Strips w/ Vegetables	Beef Goulash	Beef Goulash
23	Chicken Pesto Pasta	Chicken Pesto Pasta	Pepperoni Pizza Slice	Pepperoni Pizza Slice	Pepperoni Pizza Slice
24	Southwest Beef and Black Beans	Southwest Beef and Black Beans	Southwest Beef and Black Beans	Southwest Beef and Black Beans	Southwest Beef and Black Beans

Menu 2021
#	MRE XLI (2021)
1	Chili w/ Beans
2	Shredded BBQ Beef
3	Chicken w/ Egg Noodles & Vegetables
4	Spaghetti w/ Meat Sauce
5	Chicken Chunks
6	Beef Taco
7	Beef Brisket
8	Meatballs w/ Marinara Sauce
9	Beef Stew
10	Chili and Macaroni
11	Vegetarian Taco Pasta
12	Elbow Macaroni and Tomato Sauce
13	Cheese Tortellini
14	Spinach Mushrooms & Cream Sauce Fettuccine
15	Mexican Style Chicken Stew
16	Chicken Burrito Bowl
17	Maple Sausage
18	Beef Ravioli
19	Jalapeno Pepper Jack Beef Patty
20	Italian Sausage w/ Vegetables
21	Lemon Pepper Tuna
22	Beef Goulash
23	Pepperoni Pizza Slice
24	Southwest Beef and Black Beans

== Date codes ==
The cases of MREs and their variants usually are marked with the production date in the American fashion: 2-digit Month / 2-digit Day / 4-digit Year (e.g., November 24, 1996 would be rendered as 11/24/1996). This is followed by the Lot Number, a four-digit Julian date code that is also repeated on the individual components in the MREs. The first digit is the last digit of the Year (e.g., 0 could be equal to 2010 or 2020, 1 could be equal to 2001 or 2011, and 9 could be equal to 2009 or 2019). The next 3 digits are equal to the day of the year (i.e., 001 to 366). "1068" could be equal to the 68th day of 2001 or 2011, for example March 9, 2001. "2068" could mean March 8, 2012 or March 9, 2022 (the 68th day of 2012 is March 8 due to the presence of a leap day).

The cases are also stamped with the Inspection / Test Date, which is in the same format as the Packing Date (e.g., October 1994 would be rendered as "10/94"). Rations optimally must be kept in a cool, dry place during storage. If the rations are stored at 80° for 3 consecutive years, they would reach the end of their shelf life. They are often inspected by the U.S. Army veterinary food personnel and their shelf life may extend beyond the inspection test date. Rations are discarded after five years.

== Civilian use ==
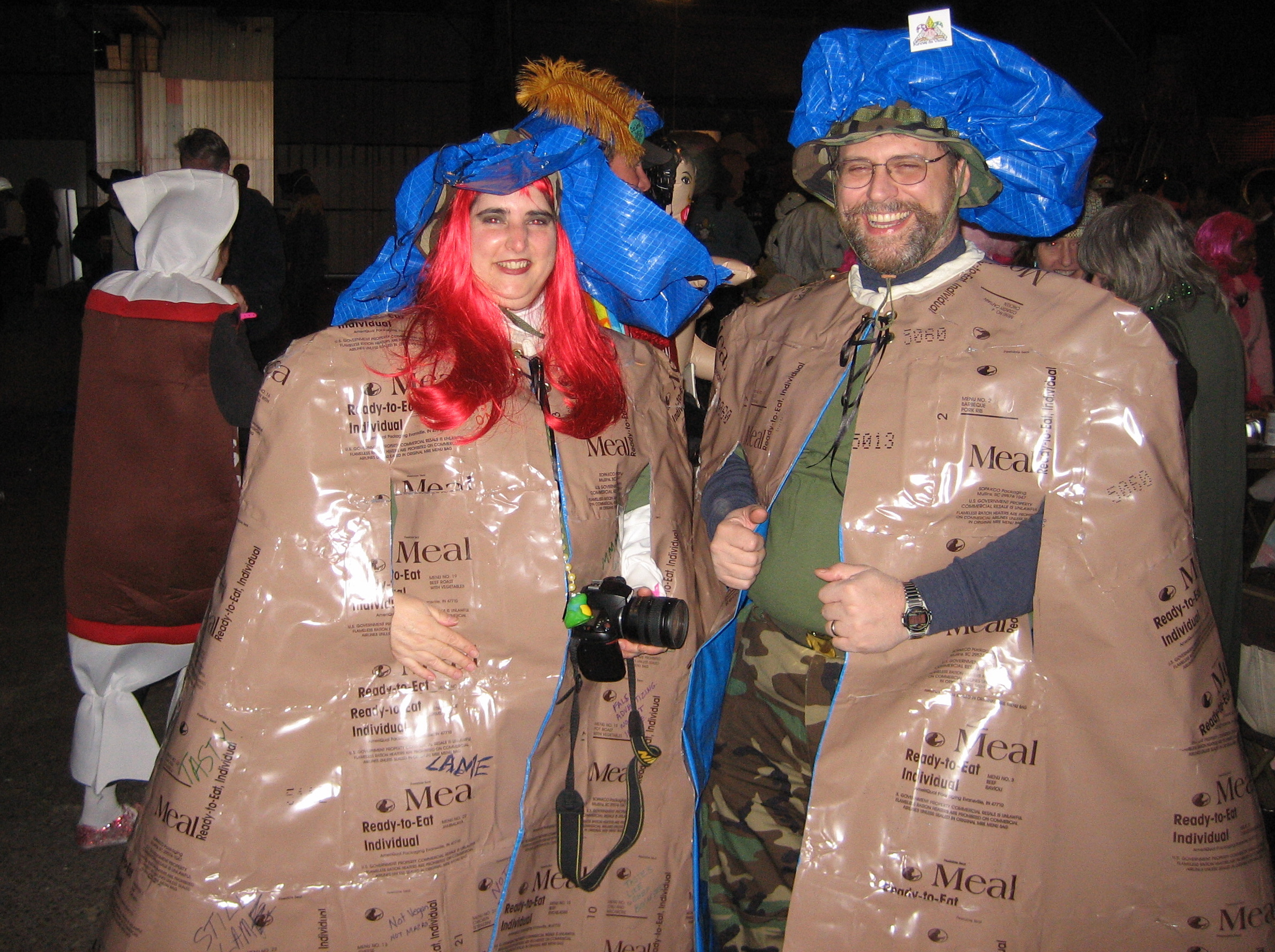
New Orleans Mardi Gras revelers in 2006 dressed in coats made from MRE packaging

MREs have also been distributed to civilians during natural disasters. The National Guard has provided MREs to the public during natural disasters, such as Hurricanes Katrina, Ike, Maria and Sandy; and the 2011 Super Outbreak. The large number of civilians exposed to MREs prompted several jokes during the recent Mardi Gras in New Orleans, with revellers donning clothing made of MRE packets with phrases such as "MRE Antoinette" (referring to Marie Antoinette; the wife of King Louis XVI) and "Man Ready to Eat".

The use of rations for noncombat environments has been questioned. While the nutritional requirements are suitable for a combat environment where servicemembers will burn many calories and lose much sodium through sweat, it has been provided as emergency food or even as a standard meal. The high-fat (averaging about 52 grams of fat, 5 grams trans fats) and high-salt content (averaging about 2 grams) are less than ideal for sedentary situations. In the aftermath of Hurricane Katrina, a 77-year-old civilian man with prior congestive heart failure ended up with volume overload from the high sodium content of MREs. The HDR and TOTM account for this nutritional need.

Civilian taste-testing of MREs is popular. For example, the YouTuber known as Steve1989MREInfo reviews MREs and other rations from the U.S. or other countries (such as the Individual Meal Pack), as well as vintage rations like the K-ration for content on YouTube. He gives comprehensive reviews and information about each ration he has.

== Criticism ==
Some of the early MRE main courses were not very palatable, earning them the nicknames "Meals Rejected by Everyone", "Meals Rejected by Ethiopians" (during the 1983–1985 famine in Ethiopia), or "Meals Rarely Edible". Some individual portions had their own nicknames. For example, the frankfurters, which came sealed in pouches of four, were referred to as "the four fingers of death". Although quality has improved over the years, many of the nicknames have stuck. MREs were sometimes called "Three Lies for the Price of One ... it's not a Meal, it's not Ready, and you can't Eat it." As late as the 2010 deployment to Afghanistan, one veteran in November 2019 characterized MREs (the traditional Thanksgiving meal had been destroyed in an attack, and the standard MRE shipment partially destroyed) as "accursed things".

Their low dietary fiber content could cause constipation in some, so they were also known as "Meals Requiring Enemas", "Meals Refusing to Exit", "Meals Refusing to Excrete", "Massive Rectal Expulsions", or "Meals Regurgitated Easily". While the laxative effect of xylitol sweetener (if excessively consumed) may contribute to a myth that the gum found in MREs contains a laxative, the crackers in the ration pack do contain a higher-than-normal vegetable content to facilitate digestion. In December 2006, comedian Al Franken (on his eighth United Service Organizations tour at the time) joked to troops in Iraq that he had his fifth MRE so far and "none of them had an exit strategy". By 2015, the average fiber content per pack of MRE has improved to an adequate 12 grams.

A superstition exists among troops about the Charms candies that come with some menus: they are considered bad luck, especially if actually eaten.

In March 2007, The Salt Lake Tribune invited three gourmet chefs to taste-test 18 MRE meals. None of the meals rated higher than a 5.7 average on a scale of 1 to 10, and the chicken fajita meal in particular was singled out for disdain, rating an average score of 1.3. In 2010, the New York Times reported that a French combat ration (such as cassoulet with accompaniments of deer pâté and nougat) could be traded for around five MREs, though by 2014 it was claimed that MRE menus had improved to the point that their worth had reversed.

The vegetable cheese omelet MRE, Recipe No. 4, introduced in 2005, is generally considered the worst ever. Soldiers serving in Iraq dubbed it the "Vomelet" (a pun with vomit), both for its appearance and taste. It was discontinued in 2009.

== Variants and similar rations ==
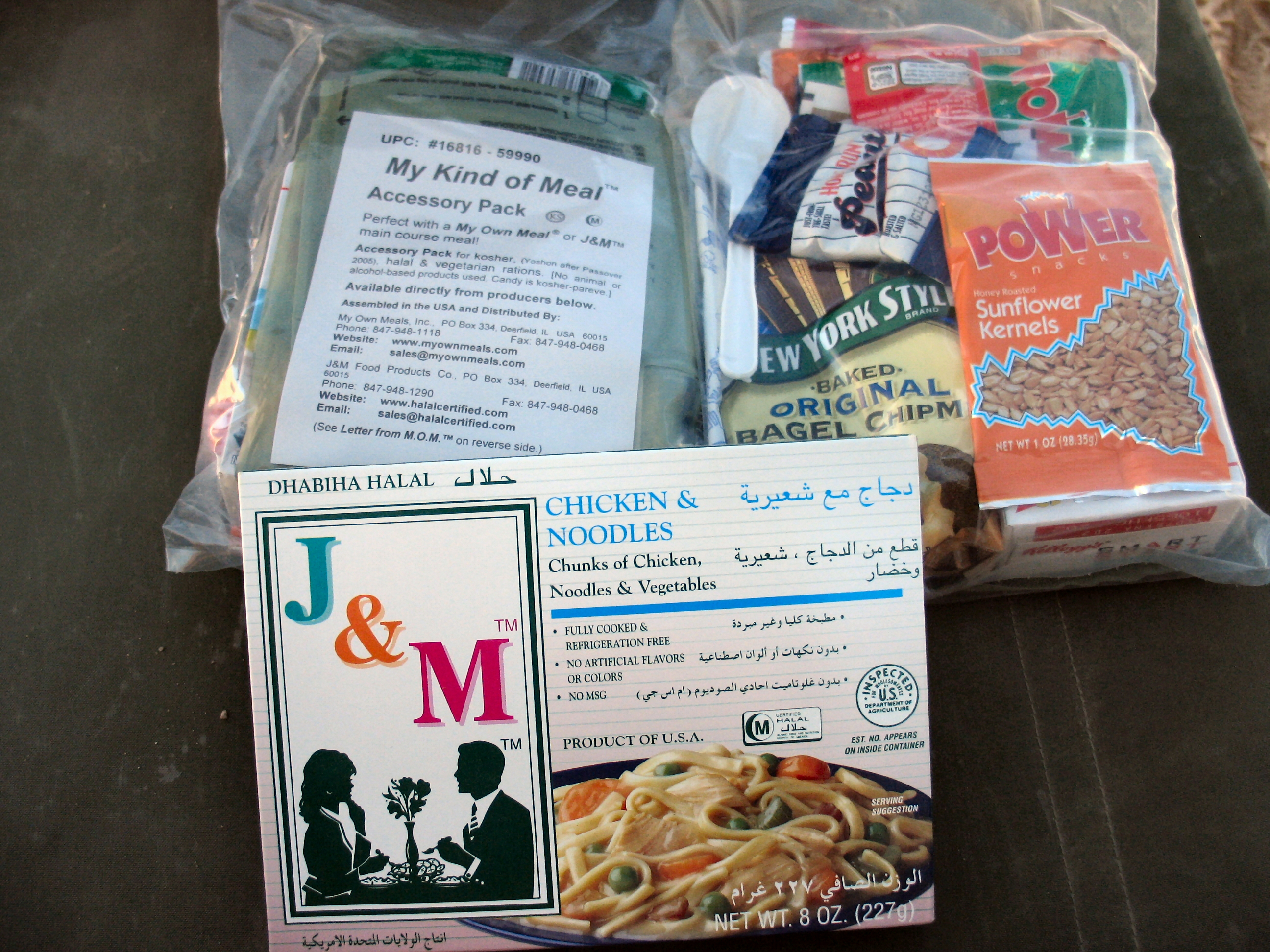
Halal ration

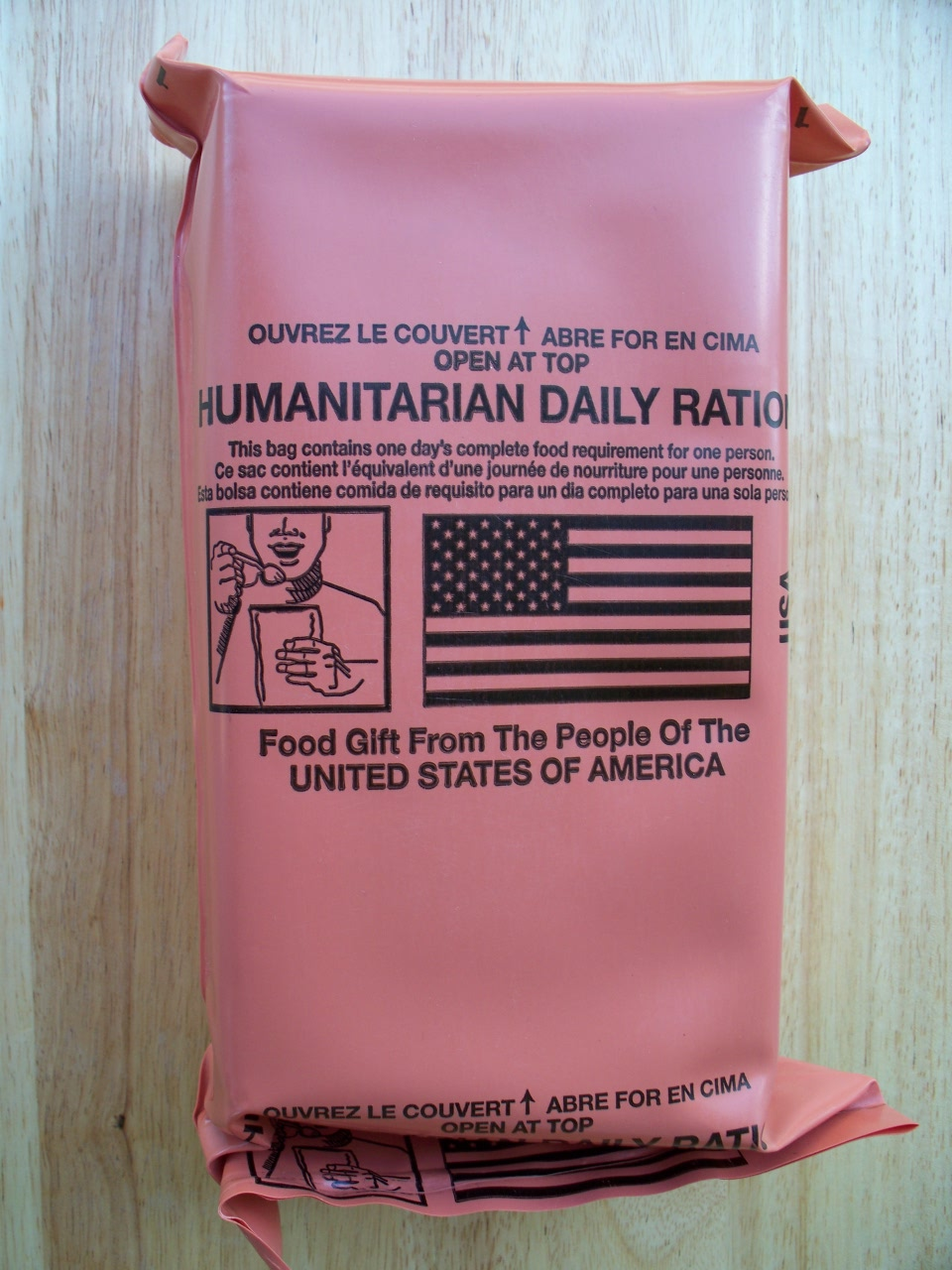
Humanitarian daily ration

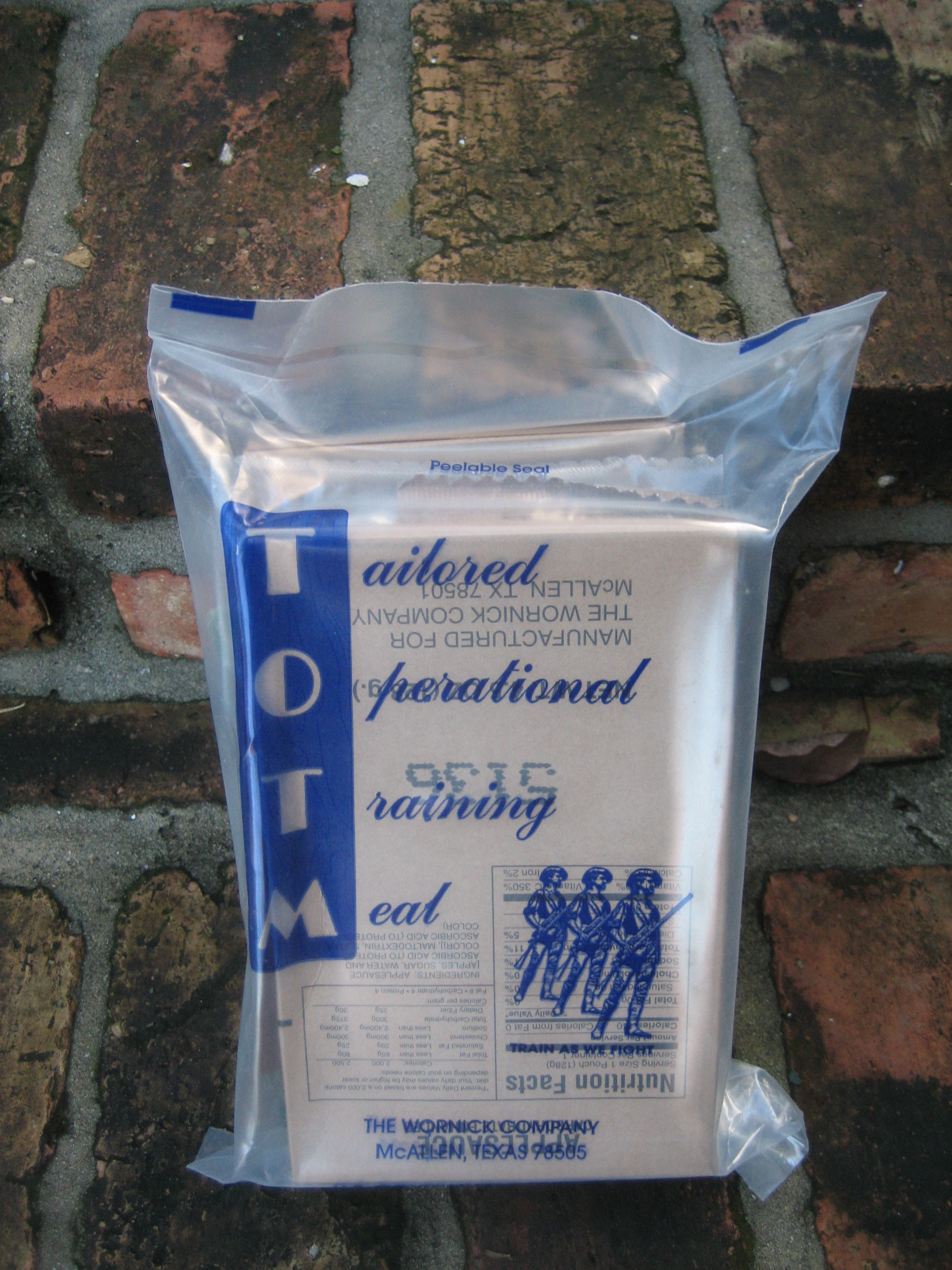
Tailored Operational Training Meal

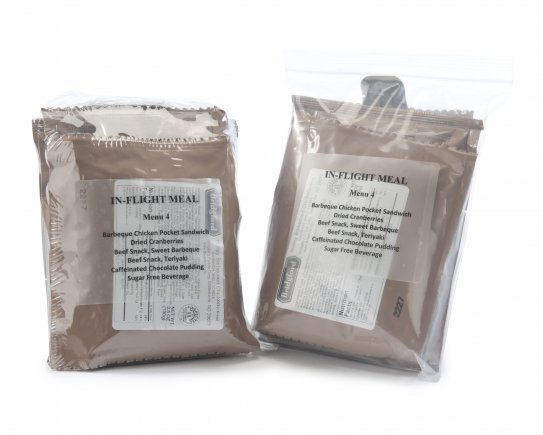
Aircrew Build to Order Meal Module

The MRE has led to the creation of several similar field rations. Aircrew Build to Order Meal Module (ABOMM) are a special variant consisting of repacking existing MRE food elements into a form that provides military flight crews and tank operators with a meal designed to be eaten on the go or while operating their aircraft or ground vehicle without the use of utensils, and packaged for use in confined spaces.

=== Meal, Religious, Kosher/Halal ===
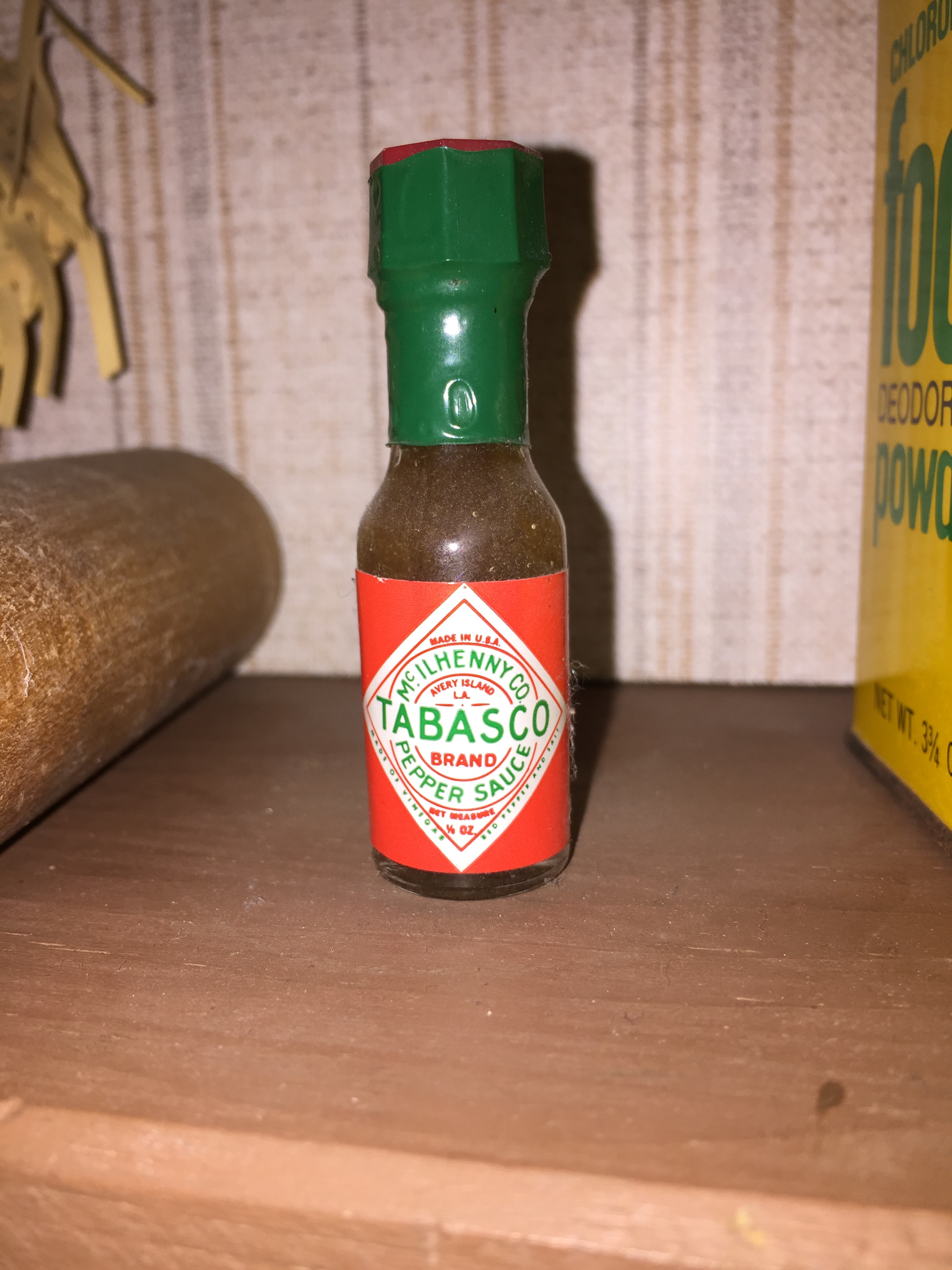
MRE Tabasco sauce bottle

For service members with strict religious dietary requirements, the military offers the specialized Meal, Religious, Kosher/Halal. These are tailored to provide the same nutritional content, but will not contain offending ingredients. The entrees come in distinct stylized packaging with a color picture of the prepared entree on it (like civilian pre-made meals) and the food accessories come in commercial packaging. Kosher entrees are marked "Glatt Kosher" in Hebrew and English, while halal entrees are marked "Dhabiha Halal" in Arabic and English. The meals come in cases of 12 that weigh 18 lb (8.2 kg) and have a volume of 1.4 cubic feet (40 L). To keep with dietary laws, the entree and accessory packets are packed in two separate inner boxes in an outer case and come in kosher or halal only (the two special ration types are never mixed in a shipping case).

The original meals were kosher only and came in 4 Beef, 4 Chicken, 2 Salmon, and 2 Gefilte Fish menus. The meals now come in Beef, Lamb, Chicken, Vegetarian, and Pasta dishes. The entrees are a mixture of traditional Middle-Eastern and South Asian dishes (like Lamb & Vegetable Jalfrezi or Curried Chicken with Basmati Rice, Lentils, and Vegetables) and Western dishes (like Vegetable Ratatouille, Florentine-style Vegetable Lasagna, or New Orleans Gumbo with Chicken). Each menu contains an average of 1200 kilocalories and has a shelf life of 3 to 10 months.

There is also a special kosher meal certified for Passover requirements. The "Passover Ration" (officially called the Meal, Religious, Kosher for Passover) contains packages of Matzoh crackers and has beef, chicken (served on the bone), or salmon entrees. Each meal is in its own packet and come 12 packets to a case.

For less strictly-observing servicemembers, non-certified "pork-free" menus of the regular MRE are available. The DLA offers Meal, Ready-to-Eat (MRE), Pork-Free, Individual, which consist of 12 menus selected from the regular roster of 24.

=== Vegetarian HDR and MARC ===
The Humanitarian Daily Ration (HDR) is a self-contained Halal meal designed to be given to refugees and other displaced people. It is designed to feed a person for a full day, and the menus are intended to be palatable to many religious and cultural tastes. To meet this goal, no animal products or by-products, no alcohol or alcohol-based products, and minimal dairy products are used in their production. It is otherwise created and packaged much like MREs; feedback from the Afghanistan campaign led to the interior packing being reinforced to withstand being air-dropped, as the packets sometimes ruptured on impact. The outer bag is tinted a high-visibility red or yellow and has an American flag and a picture of a person eating out of the bag with a spoon. There are usually instructions printed on it in English and one or more local languages as well.

The Meal, Alternative Regionally Customized (MARC) is a self-contained, shelf-stable meal developed by U.S. Army Soldier and Biological Chemical Command (SBCCOM)/Natick, Individual Combat Ration Team (ICRT), Combat Feeding Directorate (CFD). MARCs were developed specifically for detainees at Guantanamo Bay, and have since found wider spread use, notably Iraq and Afghanistan. MARC meals are entirely vegetarian as an easy way to prevent conflicts with culturally "prohibited products" (Islam and Judaism forbidding pork, Hindus avoiding beef, etc). They are neither Kosher nor Halal certified. Many of the menus available have a Southeast Asian or Indian style to them (Saag Chole, curried vegetables), but others are simply the equivalent of vegetarian MREs (Cheese Tortellini, Minestrone).

=== Higher-calorie variants ===
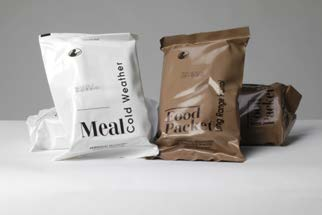
A Meal, Cold Weather (MCW) and a Meal, Long Range Patrol (LRP)

In extreme cold temperatures, the packaged wet food in MREs can freeze solid, rendering the food inedible and the heating packet insufficient. The Meal, Cold Weather (MCW) provides a ration similar to the MRE designed for lower temperatures than the MRE can withstand. Clad in white packaging, it offers a freeze-dried entree designed to be eaten with heated water, the same side ingredients as the standard MRE, and additional drink mixes to encourage additional hydration. The caloric and fat content of the meals is also increased. The MCW replaced the Ration, Cold Weather (RCW).

The Meal, Long Range Patrol (LRP) is essentially the same as the MCW, but with different accessory packs. The MLRP is designed for troops who may receive limited or no supply, and weight of the ration is critical. The similar First Strike Ration is along the same lines, but requires no preparation and may be eaten on the go.

=== Special requirement food ===
The Modular Operational Rations Enhancement (MORE) is issued as a supplement to meals for troops in extreme, demanding operational environments such as high-intensity training events.

The Tailored Operational Training Meal (TOTM) first entered service in May 2001. It provides a lower calorie count (an average of 997 kilocalories) for less intensive training environments, such as classroom instruction. It replaces the earlier mess-hall bagged lunches, catered meals or field kitchens for field instruction. The TOTM allows troops to become familiar with the MRE and its contents without providing an excessive amount of calories to troops who will not necessarily burn them. It uses a transparent outer plastic bag with commercial markings rather than the MRE's tan plastic bag with standard markings. There are currently 3 different lists of twelve menus, making a total of 36 different meals. Each TOTM ration case is packed with a full menu of 12 assorted meals, weighs about 20 lbs (9 kg), and is 0.95 cubic feet (27 L). The TOTM has a more limited shelf-life than the MRE, with a duration of only 12 to 18 months.

The Unitized Group Ration (UGR) is a ration much like the MRE, but expanded to feed large groups. It is the successor to the older A-ration, B-ration, and T-ration. It comes packed in sealed metal trays that are heated and then opened.

The Food Packet, Survival, General Purpose, Improved (FPSGPI) is given to pilots and other servicemembers that may require a small, extremely portable food ration for emergencies. It contains food bars and a drink mix. Similarly, the Food Packet, Survival, Abandon Ship (FPSAS) and Food Packet, Survival, Aircraft, Life Raft (FPSALR) are fitted into the storage areas on lifeboats.

The "Jimmy Dean", a pre-packaged shelf-stable ration containing, among other items, a pre-made Jimmy Dean brand deli-style sandwich, is often issued in the field to U.S. servicemen as an alternative to MREs.

== Ratfucking ==
The term ratfucking is a slang term used by U.S. military personnel to describe the targeted pillaging of MREs, which is not to be confused with "field stripping". It refers to the process of opening a case of MREs (which are packed 12 in a box), opening up individual MRE packages, removing the desired items, and leaving the unenticing remainder. This is in reference to the ratlike nature of the act, as of a rodent infesting an area and consuming the desirable resources. The undesirables are then placed into another MRE box, commonly referred to as the "ratfuck box".

== See also ==
- Airline meal
- Camping food
- Combat Capabilities Development Command Soldier Center – prime developer of the MRE
- Individual Meal Pack – Canadian equivalent to the MRE
- List of military food topics
- Lunchables
- Meal kit
- Military chocolate
- Ninja diet
- Space food
