= Pocket sandwich =

Bread-based food

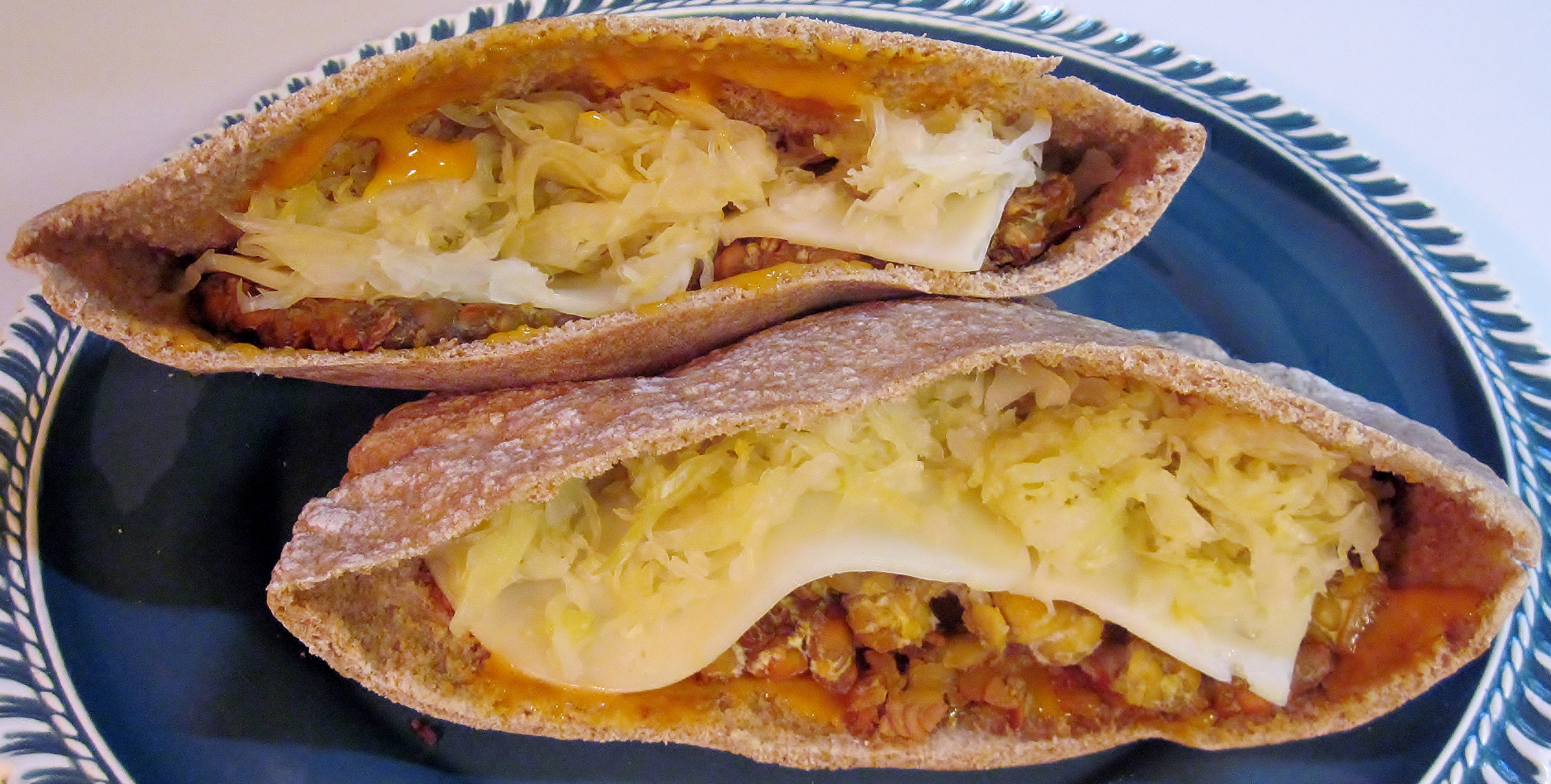
- A tempeh Reuben pita sandwich
- Type: Sandwich
- Main ingredients: Bread, various fillings

A pocket sandwich is a sandwich which is made using a single piece of folded or hollowed bread, such as a pita, or which is made from dough cooked with fillings inside.

== Types ==
- Hot Pockets
- Fougasse
- Calzone
- Stromboli
- Pita
- Klobasnek
- Runza
- Pepperoni roll
- Pizza rolls
- Hot dogs
- McStuffins: a form of the pocket sandwich served at McDonald's in 1993

== Shelf-stable rations ==
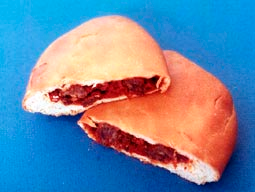
US Army's shelf-stable pocket sandwich for troops on-the-go.

The US Army has developed shelf-stable pocket sandwiches as combat feeding rations (the First Strike Ration) for its troops on-the-go. The sandwiches are engineered to prevent microbial growth through the use of specialized water treatment, acidic content (naturally, through ingredient selection; or by the addition of food-grade acids), special multi-layer foil packaging, and oxygen-absorbing packets.

== See also ==
- Finger food
- List of sandwiches
- List of stuffed dishes
