= Flameless ration heater =

U.S. military self-heating ration technology

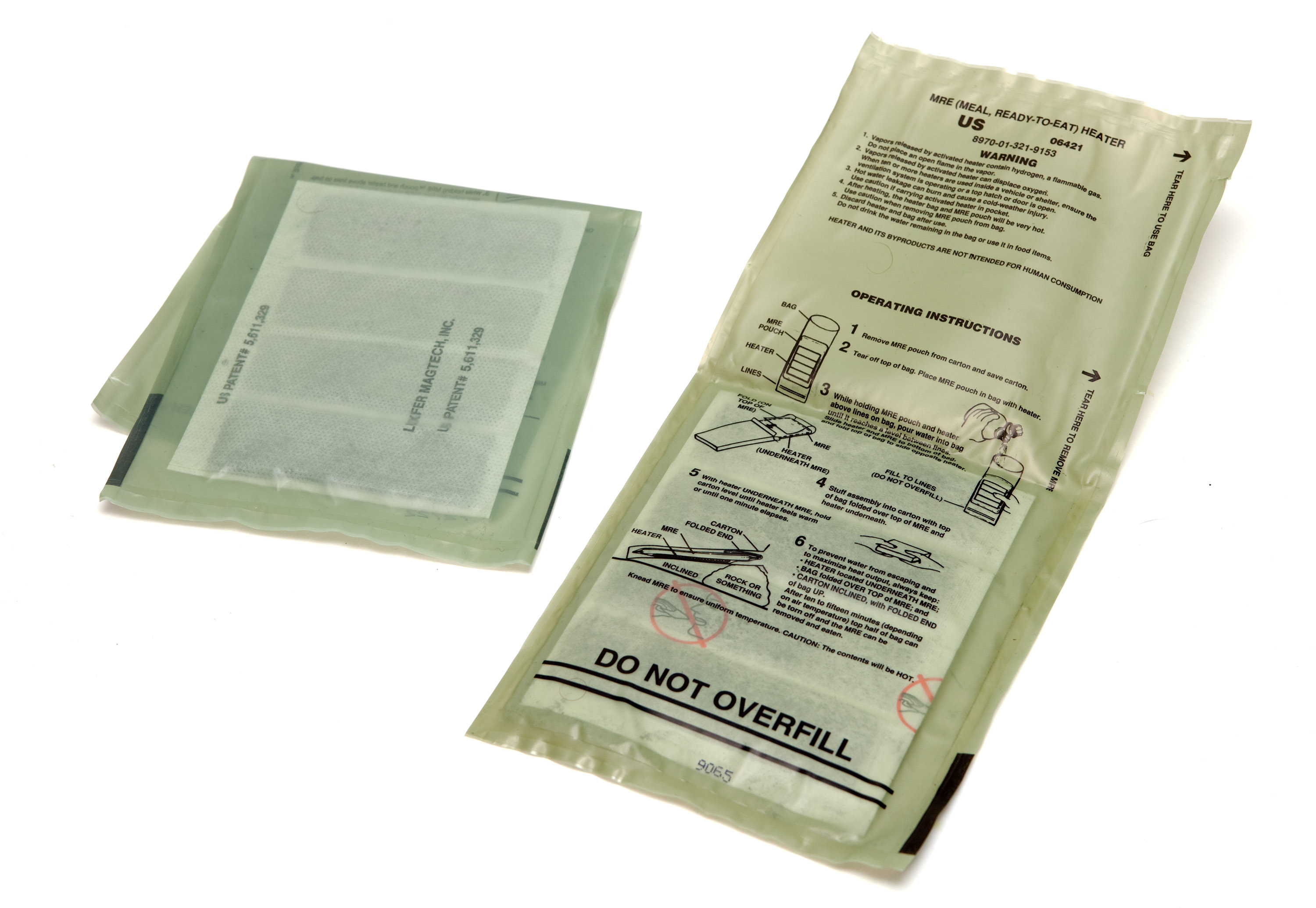
A pair of flameless ration heaters

A flameless ration heater (FRH), colloquially an MRE heater, is a form of self-heating food packaging included in U.S. military Meal, Ready-to-Eat (MRE) rations since 1993.

The heater is a plastic bag filled with magnesium and iron powders and table salt. When a meal pouch is placed in the bag and water is added, an exothermic reaction occurs which rapidly boils the water to heat the food.

The U.S. Army began research into a chemical method to heating meals in 1973. The FRH was first issued in May 1990, and an FRH was included with each MRE since 1993.

== History ==
Before the development of the FRH, service members heated their meals by boiling the food pouches in a canteen cup heated over a lit Sterno gel or portable stove. This was slow, especially in cold weather, and was made more difficult in windy or wet conditions. It also produced a visible flame that was undesirable at night. Sometimes they heated the pouches by placing them on a hot vehicle's engine block or exhaust manifold. Because of these problems, service members frequently ate their meals cold either due to a lack of a heating source, a lack of time, or both.

The research and development into a flameless ration heater began in 1973 by the U.S. Army Natick Research, Development, and Engineering Center in Natick, Massachusetts. A patented water-activated magnesium-carbon chemical heating product was investigated. In 1980, Natick learned that the U.S. Navy had developed a magnesium-iron alloy powder for buoyancy devices and heated diving vests. This was more cost efficient, so the University of Cincinnati was contracted to develop it into a prototype MRE heater, which was called the Dismounted Ration Heating Device (DRHD). The inventors later incorporated under the name Zesto-Therm Inc. and patented the meal heating product (now called the ZT Energy Pad), and began selling it for civilian use.

In 1986 the U.S. Army evaluated the ZT Energy Pad and found that it did not always heat the food adequately and left a messy residue on the outside of the food pouches. A focus group of 26 soldiers was surveyed to compare heating an MRE with a Zesto-Therm pad compared to the canteen cup method heated with a trioxane fuel bar. 100% preferred the flameless ration heater: it was compact, disposable, and did not require equipment to carry and clean. However, it was about twice as expensive as a trioxane fuel bar. Although, it was discovered that in cold climates, two or even three trioxane bars would be needed to adequately heat the meal, making the FRH cheaper overall.

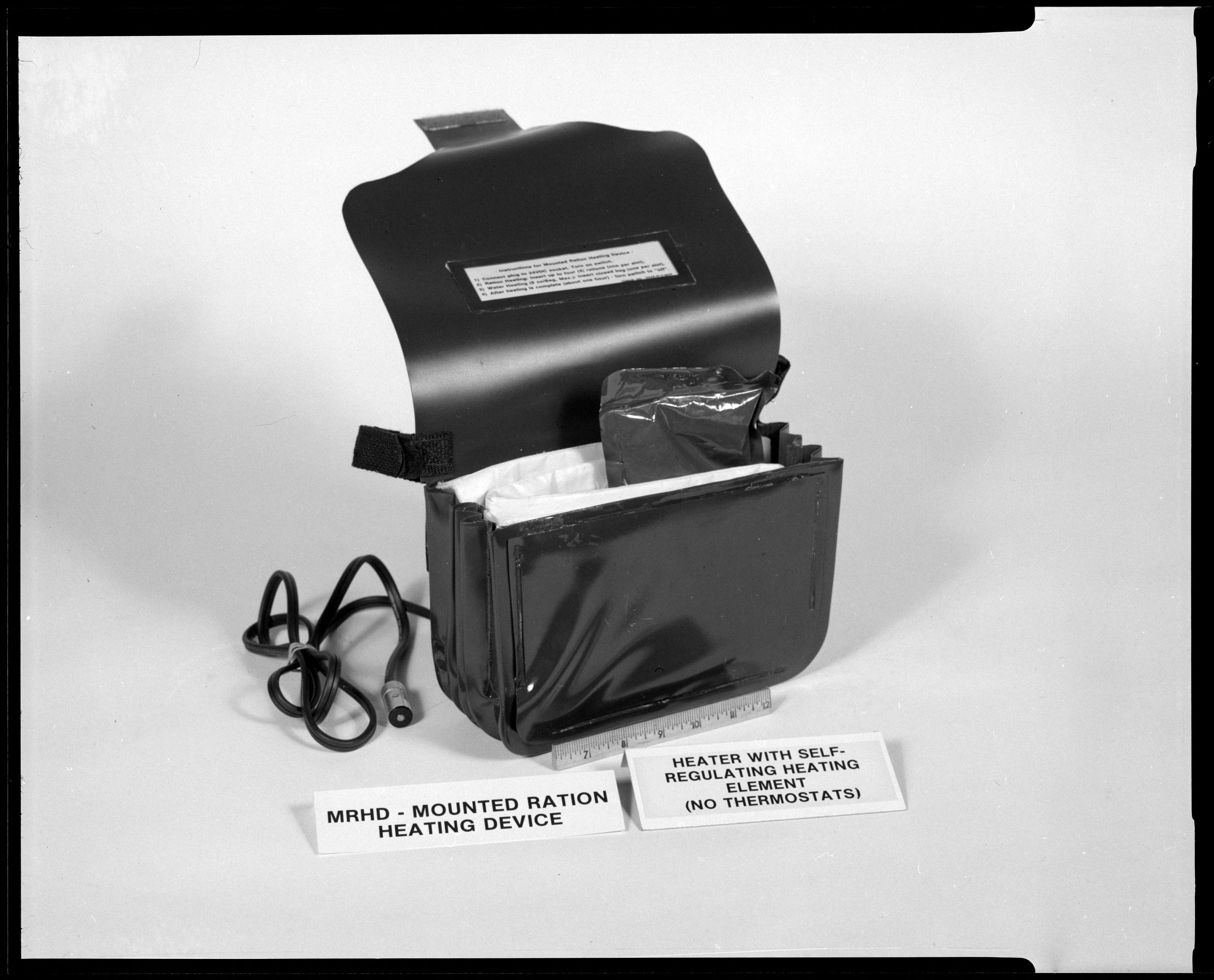
A Mounted Ration Heating Device, a prototype Flameless Ration Heater. Service members would power the device using the attached cable and a running vehicle. Up to four MRE pouches could be heated at once.

Other prototypes were developed, such as the Mounted Ration Heating Device (MRHD), an electrical device that could be powered from a vehicle's power supply and used to heat up to four rations at once. The MRHD was generally preferred over the Zesto-Therm pads, but not all vehicles had the proper connections to power the device, and having a single device meant service members needed to take turns using it.

A package needed to be developed to safely cook the food in while the chemical reaction was activated. Zesto-Therm already had a line of insulated cooking pouches on the market, but they were found to be too expensive and impractical to be issued with each MRE. A high-density polyethylene bag was developed that was food safe, would protect the chemical from accidental activation when stored, could withstand the temperatures required during cooking, and was transparent so the service member could easily measure a quantity of water by filling it to a line printed on the bag.

Once the design was finalized, the acquisition process was quickly completed. In May 1990, the FRH was approved for bulk issue. A process that normally takes four to six years to award contracts was instead completed in one year so the FRH could be used in Operation Desert Storm. 51 million FRHs were purchased for $25 million, and approximately 4.5 million FRHs were shipped to Southwest Asia for the Gulf War. Beginning in 1993, one FRH was packaged with each MRE.

== Usage ==
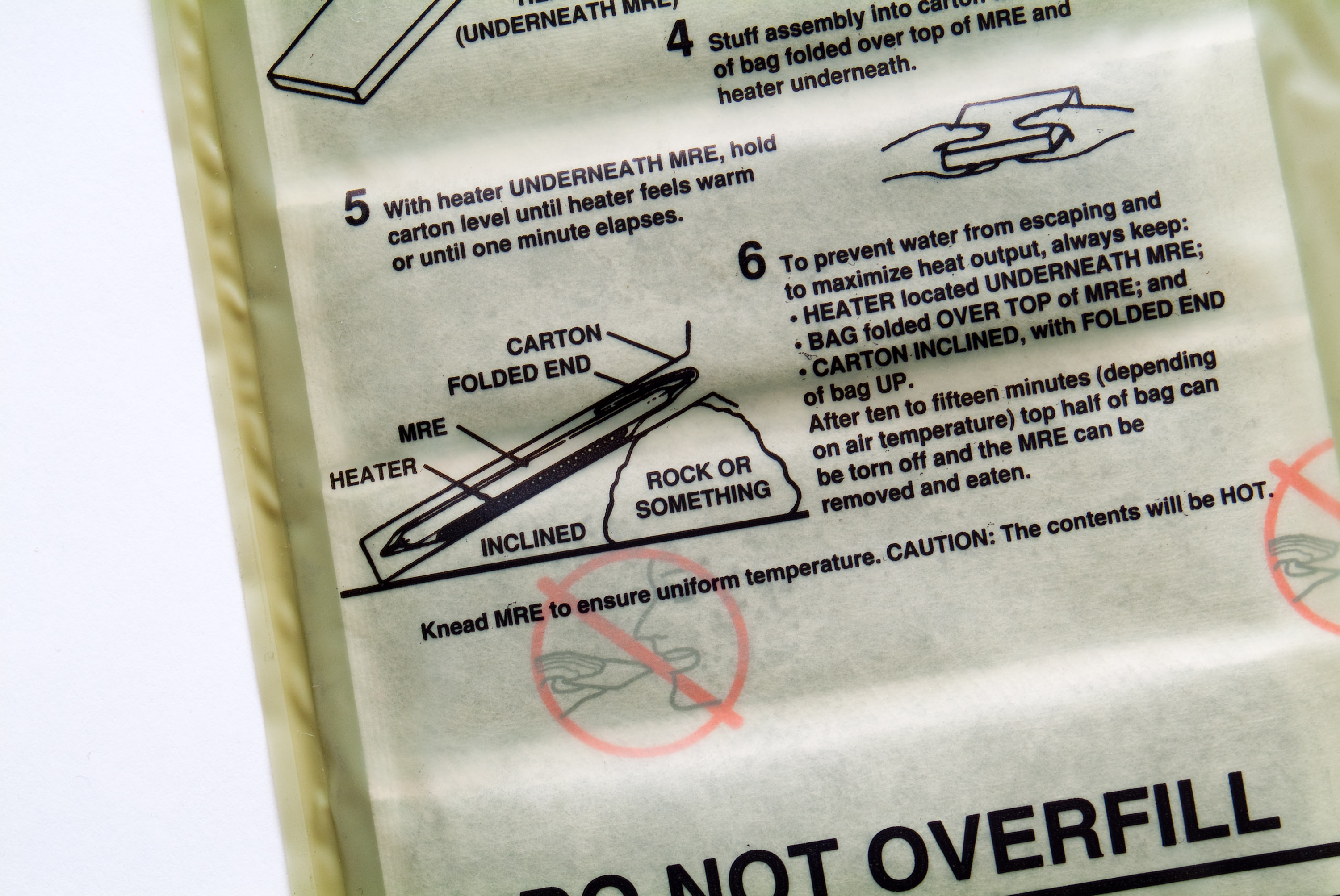
The instructions advise that the heater should rest against a "rock or something".

The flameless ration heater is issued in a plastic bag with instructions printed on it. Inside the bag is a small quantity of metallic powders, which does the actual heating. To heat a meal, the bag is first torn open, and a sealed food pouch is placed inside. About 1 US fluid ounce (30 mL) of water is then added to the bag, using the line printed on the bag as a marker. The chemical reaction begins immediately, and takes about 12 to 15 minutes to heat a food pouch to about 60 °C (140 °F). It is recommended to place the bag within the cardboard carton the MRE is issued with to prevent injury, and to prop it upright so the water does not leak out and prematurely stop the reaction.

== Chemical reaction ==
Ration heaters generate heat in an electron-transfer process called an oxidation-reduction reaction. Water oxidizes magnesium metal, according to the following chemical reaction:

Mg + 2H_{2}O → Mg(OH)_{2} + H_{2} [+ heat (q)]

This reaction is analogous to iron being rusted by oxygen, and proceeds at about the same slow rate, which is too slow to generate usable heat. To accelerate the reaction, metallic iron particles and table salt (NaCl) are mixed with the magnesium particles.

Iron and magnesium metals, when suspended in an electrolyte, form a galvanic cell that can generate electricity. When water is added to a ration heater, it dissolves the salt to form a salt-water electrolyte, thereby turning each particle of magnesium and iron into a tiny battery. Because the magnesium and iron particles are in contact, they essentially become thousands of tiny short-circuited batteries which quickly burn out, producing heat in a process the patent holders call "supercorroding galvanic cells".

One brand of self-heating rations uses 7.5 grams of a powdered magnesium-iron alloy, consisting of 95% magnesium and 5% iron by weight, 0.5 grams of salt, in addition to an inert filler and anti-foaming agent. Upon adding one US fluid ounce (30 ml) of water, this mixture can raise the temperature of a 8-ounce (230 g) meal packet by 100 °F (38 °C) in about 10 minutes, releasing approximately 50 kilojoules (47 BTU) of heat energy at about 80 watts.

The main disadvantage of the magnesium-based heaters is the production of hydrogen gas. While it is not often a risk when used in the field, it may pose a fire hazard for consumer use. Alternative formulations have been developed to eliminate the hydrogen gas, such as the combination of aluminum chloride with calcium oxide (AlCl_{3}/CaO) and diphosphorous pentoxide with calcium oxide (P_{2}O_{5}/CaO).

== Confined space hazard ==
The United States Department of Transportation (DOT) Federal Aviation Administration (FAA) conducted testing and released a report which in summary states "... the release of hydrogen gas from these flameless ration heaters is of a sufficient quantity to pose a potential hazard on board a passenger aircraft." This testing was performed on commercial grade 'heater meals' which consisted of an unenclosed flameless heat pouch, a bag of salt water, a styrofoam saucer/tray and a meal in a sealed, microwavable/boilable bowl.

== Disposal ==
MRE heaters that have not been properly activated must be disposed of as hazardous waste. Disposing of an un-activated MRE heater in a solid waste container is against United States law. Un-activated MRE heaters pose a potential fire hazard if they become wet when turned in at a landfill site. MRE heaters must be disposed of in approved solid waste containers aboard the installation after they have been properly activated. The FRH can be disposed of as household waste after it is activated and cools down.

== See also ==
- Active packaging
