= LRP ration =

U.S. military freeze-dried dehydrated field ration

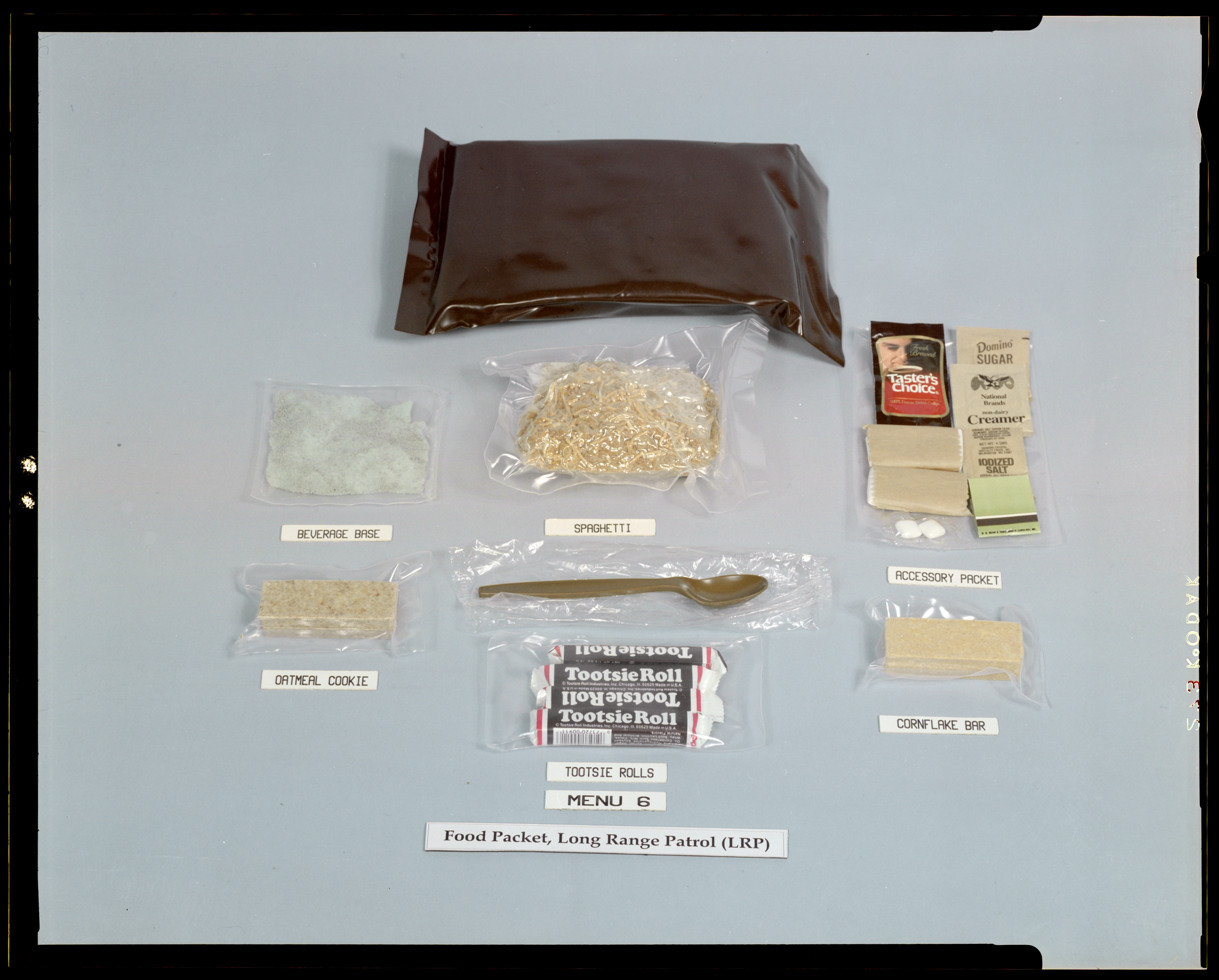
LRP ration, menu 6. Clockwise from top left: beverage base, spaghetti, accessory packet, cornflake bar, tootsie rolls, oatmeal cookie.

The Food Packet, Long Range Patrol (LRP; pronounced "lurp") was a freeze-dried dehydrated United States military ration used by the Department of Defense. Developed in 1964 and intended for wide adoption during the Vietnam War, its use was eventually limited to American special operations forces during long-range reconnaissance patrols, where bulky canned Meal, Combat, Individual (MCI) rations proved too heavy for extended missions on foot. The LRP had a cold-weather warfare equivalent, the Ration, Cold Weather (RCW).

The LRP and RCW were mostly superseded by the Meal, Ready-to-Eat (MRE) in the 1980s. They are no longer produced or used by the U.S. military, having been replaced in 2001 by the Meal, Cold Weather/Food Packet, Long Range Patrol (MCW/LRP), which combines the functions and roles of both rations under a unified system.

== Precursors ==
Before the outbreak of World War II, Army commanders had recognized the inadequacy of heavy canned wet rations when employed for infantry marching on long patrols, especially in extreme environments such as mountain or jungle terrain. To this end, the Jungle ration was developed and briefly issued during early World War II. The Jungle ration was a dry, lightweight multi-component daily meal that could be stored in light waterproof bags, easily carried by a foot soldier, and which would not spoil when exposed to heat and humidity for an extended period of time. Importantly, the Jungle ration was specifically designed to provide an increased amount of dietary energy despite its lighter weight, ideal for a soldier operating in difficult jungle terrain on foot while carrying all of his equipment on his back. By all accounts the Jungle ration was successful; however, cost concerns led to its replacement, first by substitution of increasingly heavier and less expensive canned components, followed by complete discontinuance in 1943.

After the war, U.S. Army logisticians again re-standardized field rations, eliminating all lightweight rations in favor of heavy canned wet rations such as the C-ration and the MCI. The overuse of heavy canned wet rations reached a ludicrous extreme during the early years of U.S. involvement in the Vietnam War, when American soldiers on extended infantry patrol were forced to stack their canned rations in socks to minimize weight and noise.

In response, the Food Packet, Individual, Combat (FPIC), was developed in the early-1960s, though not fielded until 1966. The FPIC was designed to be nutritious, lightweight, and easily portable, the descendant of the dehydrated rations used by NASA's astronauts. The ration was originally a response to complaints about the weight of the canned ration. Carrying a multi-day supply of heavy wet canned MCI or C-rations, "a special operations team could become virtually immobile due to the weight of needed supplies. Mobility and stealth are decreased when loads become too heavy, and the soldier is too often worn down by midday. Fatigue affects alertness, making him more vulnerable to detection and error." The ration's final 11-ounce (310-gram) weight was a compromise between the original packet's target weight of 5 ounces (140 g) and the base 1-pound (450-gram) target weight of the larger experimental Meal, Ready-to-Eat, Individual (MRE-I), a forerunner of the later MRE.

The FPIC differed from the standard wet-pack MCI in that it was a freeze-dried, vacuum-packed individual ration meal weighing 11 ounces (310 g) packed in a waterproof grey-green canvas envelope lined with aluminum foil. Due to its tendency to spoil in wet or humid environments (common in Southeast Asia), later ration packs came enclosed in an outer zip-lock clear-plastic bag to keep out the moisture. This drawback made it less than desirable as a standard ration.

== Food Packet, Long Range Patrol ==
A freeze-dried, dehydrated ration, the FPIC required 1 1/2 U.S. pints (700 milliliters) of water to cook and reconstitute it. This was not a problem where water supplies were plentiful. However, the water sources in Vietnam were usually teeming with parasites such as blood flukes and tapeworms, as well as viruses, so the water had to be boiled or mixed with iodine tablets, the latter leaving an unwanted taste in a ration. Fresh water could also be collected from rainwater or, in an emergency, a LRP ration could be consumed 'dry', but the soldier doing so had to consume extra water to prevent dehydration. Some soldiers mixed its contents with MCI rations to reduce monotony and to supply extra dietary energy, as the ration was insufficient for an active soldier. However, this defeated the purpose of deploying the LRP ration in the first place. Another complaint was the absence of cigarettes found in C-rations.

Due to these drawbacks, the original concept of its wide adoption was shelved in favor of its limited use by Special Operations units like the Long Range Patrols, Special Forces, and Navy SEALs. It then acquired the new designation of Food Packet, Long Range Patrol (LRP), also known as "Lurp meals" or "long rats". Production was limited to five million units in 1967, rising to just nine million in 1968. It was considered a novelty by line soldiers, who usually "acquired" as many as they could before going on field operations.

The LRP ration continued to be procured in small quantities until the mid-1980s, when it was replaced by a thermo-stabilized ration, the Meal, Ready-to-Eat (MRE). Quartermaster Command and Army Food Services viewed the new ration as a suitable replacement for issue in all combat environments. Despite the long history of operational failures previously encountered in standardizing on a single type of individual ration, the new MRE was duly adopted with the intention of replacing all the field rations and ration supplements in use.

=== Contents ===
LRP rations of the mid-1960s were packed in a large cardboard box of twenty-four meals in eight varieties. Each variety had a different meal, which came in a tinfoil packet inside a zippered olive-drab canvas pouch. These meals were:

1. Beef hash
2. Beef and rice
3. Beef stew
4. Chicken and rice
5. Chicken stew
6. Chili con carne
7. Pork and scalloped potatoes
8. Spaghetti with meat sauce

Included in the box was a brown-foil accessory packet. The accessory packet contained:

- Instant coffee (Two packets)
- Coffee creamer (One packet, four grams)
- Sugar (One packet, six grams)
- Candy-coated gum (Two pieces)
- Compressed fruitcake bar or Tropical Bar
- Toilet paper
- Cardboard matches (One book)
- Cigarettes (Four sticks; eliminated in 1975)

Although compact, the LRP daily ration was 'energy depleted', supplying 5,000 kilojoules (1,200 kcal) less energy per day than the MCI.

== Long Range Patrol – Improved ==
While the MRE was lighter than the canned MCI and had more dietary energy than the LRP ration, it had certain problems. US Special Operations forces found it too bulky, and troops on maneuvers found some menu items were unsuited for easy digestion in cold-weather, high-altitude, high-temperature, or humid environments. While unofficial practice was to strip out items deemed "unnecessary", this also reduced the ration's dietary energy content. Faced with these problems, this forced the adoption of a specialized ration for light troops or commando units on extended field operations.

In 1994, a new version of the LRP called the Food Packet, Long-Range Patrol – Improved (LRP-I) was created. It was an 11-ounce (310 g) ration that came in a brown plastic retort pouch that allowed the user to reconstitute and cook the ration directly in the pouch. This was an improvement over the earlier LRP packet, which had to be boiled or soaked in a canteen cup or other cookware.

Long Range Patrol Ration – Improved (1994–2001)
#	Entree	Cereal Bar	Dessert 1	Dessert 2	Beverage
Menu 1	Chicken Stew	Cornflake Bar	Oatmeal Cookie Bar	Candy Toffee Roll, Chocolate (4 pieces)	Apple Cider Drink
Menu 2	Beef Stew	Granola Bar	Chocolate-Covered Cookie	Caramels	Hot Cocoa Beverage
Menu 3	Sweet & Sour Pork	Branflake Bar	Peanut Butter & Crackers		Apple Cider Drink
Menu 4	Chicken Ala King	Branflake Bar	Chocolate-Covered Cookie	Hard Candies	Powdered Orange Drink
Menu 5	Lasagna	Branflake Bar	Peanut Butter & Crackers		Lemon Tea (2 packets)
Menu 6	Spaghetti with Meat Sauce	Cornflake Bar	Oatmeal Cookie Bar	Candy Toffee Roll, Chocolate (4 pieces)	Beverage Base (Bouillon Powder)
Menu 7	Chili Con Carne	Granola Bar	Fig Bar	Hard Candies	Powdered Orange Drink
Menu 8	Beef and Rice	Cornflake Bar	Fig Bar	Chocolate-Covered Discs, (2 pieces)	Lemon Tea (2 packets)

== Meal, Cold Weather/Food Packet, Long Range Patrol ==
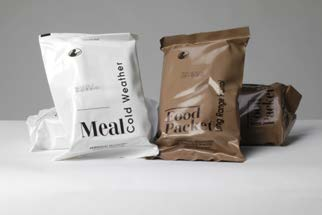
The MCW and LRP, pictured in 2012

In 2001, the LRP-I was merged with the MCW to create the consolidated Meal, Cold Weather/Food Packet, Long Range Patrol (MCW/LRP) ration. As in years past, this was done in order to further standardize supply and save costs, as both were considered compact, high-energy meals that were designed for use by active soldiers in the field. The meal weighs 1 pound (454 g) and comes in 12 different entrees.

The meals differ only in the accessory packs. One is geared for use by light infantry and commando units operating in temperate or hot climates and comes in brown or tan packaging. The other is geared more for use in cold weather or high elevations and comes in white packaging.

== See also ==
- K-ration
- Jungle ration
- Mountain ration
- United States military ration
