= Garrison ration =

Type of ration issued to military personnel

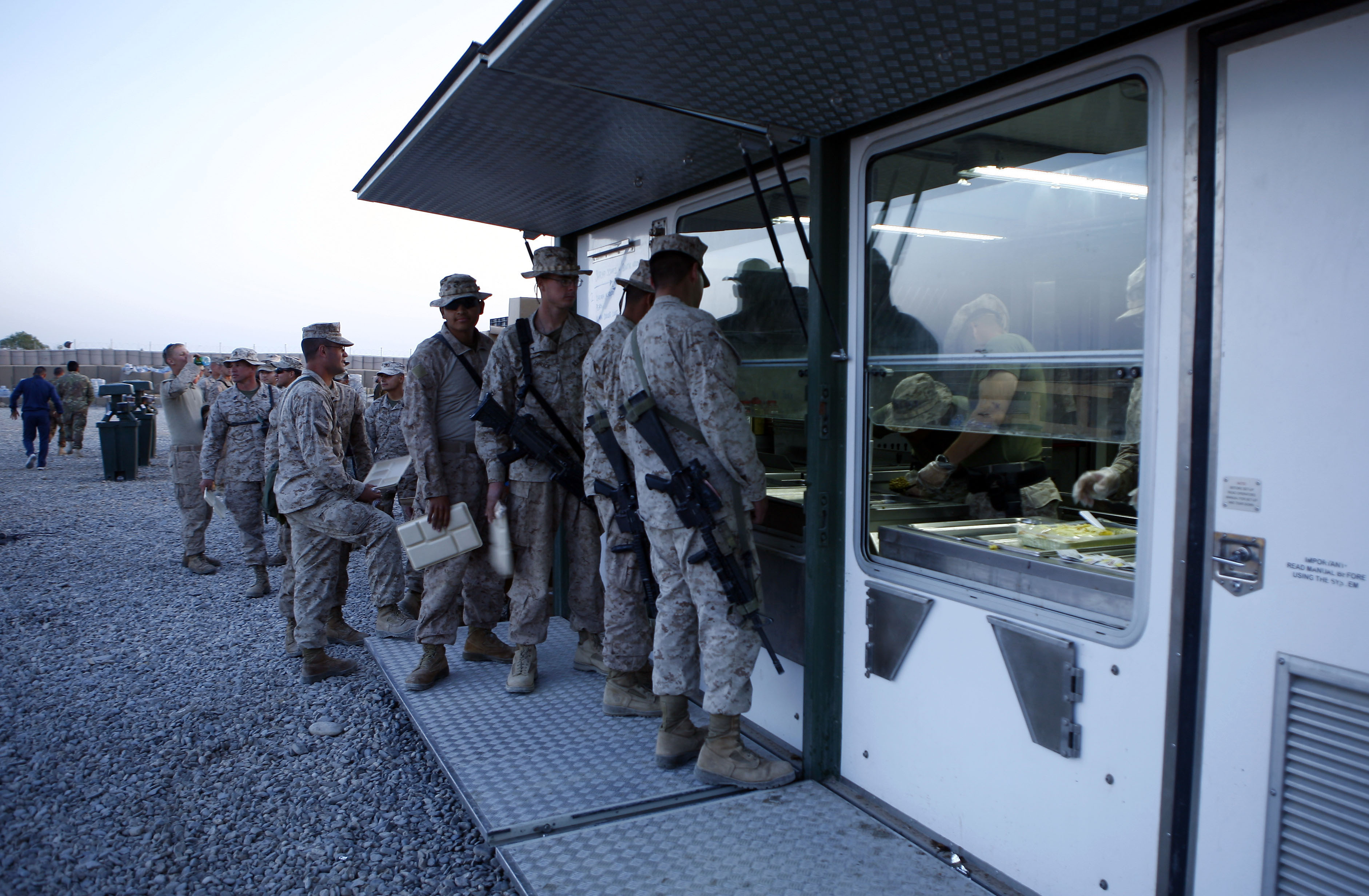
U.S. Marines receiving food rations from a field kitchen at Forward Operating Base Delaram in Afghanistan, 2009

A garrison ration (or mess ration for food rations of this type) is a type of military ration. Usually distinct from field rations, the term has varying meanings, but generally refers to either rations issued to personnel at a camp, installation, or other garrison; allowance (in the form of scrip or legal tender) allotted to personnel to purchase goods or rations sold in a garrison; the rations purchased with the aforementioned allowance; or a type of issued ration.

In some instances, what determines a ration to be a garrison ration depends on situational context. For example, a 1941 United States Army Field Manual defines a "garrison ration" as rations purchased with allowance in peacetime, with a "field ration" being rations issued in wartime or other special circumstances at no cost to those distributing or receiving them.

The term is often used in a historical context, but modern equivalents to garrison rations exist, though official use of the term in a present-day context is rare.

== Wehrmacht ==
German rations were issued on a scale according to the duties and locations of the troops, there were 4 scales of ration:

Ration I (Verpflegungssatz I) is for troops committed to combat, for those that are recuperating from combat, and for troops stationed in Norway north of 66° N. Latitude.

Ration II (Verpflegungssatz II) is for occupation and line-of-communication troops.

Ration III (Verpflegungssatz III) is for garrison troops within Germany.

Ration IV (Verpflegungssatz IV) goes to office workers and nurses within Germany.

Food Item	Ration I	Ration II	Ration III	Ration IV
Rye bread	700g (1.54 lb)	700g (1.54 lb)	700g (1.54 lb)	600g (1.32 lb)
Fresh meat with bones	136g (4.8 oz)	107g (3.7 oz)	90g (3.17 oz)	56g (2 oz)
Soy bean flour	7g (0.24 oz)	7g (0.24 oz)	7g (0.24 oz)	7g (0.24 oz)
Headless fish	30g (1 oz)	30g (1 oz)	30g (1 oz)	30g (1 oz)
Fresh vegetables and fruits	250g (8.8 oz)	250g (8.8 oz)	250g (8.8 oz)	250g (8.8 oz)
Potatoes	320g (11.29 oz)	320g (11.29 oz)	320g (11.29 oz)	320g (11.29 oz)
Legumes	80g (2.8 oz)	80g (2.8 oz)	80g (2.8 oz)	80g (2.8 oz)
Pudding powder	20g (0.70 oz)	20g (0.70 oz)	20g (0.70 oz)	20g (0.70 oz)
Sweetened condensed skim milk	25g (0.88 oz)	25g (0.88 oz)	25g (0.88 oz)	25g (0.88 oz)
Salt	15g (0.5 oz)	15g (0.5 oz)	15g (0.5 oz)	15g (0.5 oz)
Other seasonings	3g (0.1 oz)	3g (0.1 oz)	3g (0.1 oz)	3g (0.1 oz)
Spices	1g (0.03 oz)	1g (0.03 oz)	1g (0.03 oz)	1g (0.03 oz)
Fats and bread spreads	60g (2.11 oz)	50g (1.76 oz)	40g (1.41 oz)	35g (1.23 oz)
Coffee	9g (0.32 oz)	9g (0.32 oz)	9g (0.32 oz)	9g (0.32 oz)
Sugar	40g (1.4 oz)	35g (1.23 oz)	30g (1.05 oz)	30g (1.05 oz)
Supplementary allowances	2g (0.07 oz)	2g (0.07 oz)	2g (0.07 oz)	2g (0.07 oz)
Total Maximum Ration in grams	1698	1654	1622	1483
Total Maximum Ration in Pounds	3.74	3.64	3.57	3.26

== United Kingdom ==
In 1689 the first Royal warrant was published concerning the messing provisions for troops. The Commissary General was authorised to issue rations on a repayment basis. The ration was two-thirds of a pound (302 g) of bread and two-thirds of a pound of meat. Fourpence (4d) was deducted daily from the soldiers' pay.

As there were no barracks at the time, soldiers were billeted on inn-keepers. The inn-keepers would receive fourpence to provide meals to the billeted soldiers.

In 1792 barracks for soldiers were introduced and soldiers were given 1 1/2d a day for bread.

In 1795 allowances for bread and necessities were consolidated to 2 1/4d per day and was later increased in the year by 1 1/2d per day to reflect increased prices of bread and meat.

From 1815 to 1854 the daily ration for a British soldier in the United Kingdom was 1 pound of bread (453 g) and 3/4 of a pound of meat (340 g). Two meals were provided, breakfast at 7.30 a.m. and dinner at 12.30 p.m.

In the West Indies troops were issued with salt beef on five days with fresh meat being issued for two days a week.

=== Crimean War ===
Following initial disasters in the supply system, reforms were made and British troops were issued the following; 24 oz (680 g) of bread, 16 oz (453 g) of meat, 2 oz (56 g) of rice, 2 oz (56 g) of sugar, 3 oz (85 g) of coffee, 1 gill (0.118l) of spirits and 1/2 oz (14 g) of salt.

=== First World War ===
During the First World War British troops were issued the following daily ration; 1 1/4 pound (567 g) of meat, 1 pound (453 g) preserved meat, 1 1/4 (567 g) pound of bread, (or 1 pound (453 g) of biscuit and 4 oz (113 g) of bacon), 4 oz (113 g) of jam, 3 oz (85 g) of sugar, 5/8 oz (17 g) of tea, 8 oz (226 g) of vegetables and 2 oz (56 g) of butter (weekly).

==== Horse Rations ====
As horses were a principal form of transport for the British Army, horses also had a scale of rations issued.

Grain issued to horses at home (United Kingdom)
	Rations in permanent or temporary stables.		Rations in camp.	
	Oats	Maize	Oats	Maize
Heavy draught horses	11lbs	4lbs	11lbs	4lbs
Officers' chargers and all riding horses of 15 hands 1 1/2 inclusive and upwards	10lbs	-	10lbs	-
Riding horses (other than officers' chargers) under 15 hands 1 1/2, and pack horses	9lbs	-	10lbs	-
Light draught horses	7lb	3lbs	8lbs	3lbs
Heavy draught mules	-	12lbs	-	13lbs
Light draught mules	-	10lbs	-	10lbs
Pack mules	-	6lbs	-	7lbs

=== Inter-war years ===
In 1921 the Treasury accepted that the public should be responsible for rations and the first ration scale was approved. The daily ration scale was;

12 oz (340 g) Meat, 16 oz (453 g) bread and 2 oz (56 g) of bacon.

=== Second World War ===
British troops in the United Kingdom had a ration scale set with different scales of rations for male and female soldiers. The daily ration scale in September 1941 was as follows;

==== Food ====	Meat	Bacon and Ham	Butter and margarine	Cheese	Cooking fats	Sugar	Tea	Preserves
Army rations Home Service Scale (Men)	12 oz (340 g)	1.14 oz (32 g)	1.89 oz (53 g)	0.57 oz (16 g)	0.28 oz (7 g)	4.28 oz (121 g)	0.57 oz (16 g)	1.14 oz (32 g)
Army rations Home Service Scale (Women)	6 oz (170 g)	1.28 oz (36 g)	1.5 oz (42 g) (margarine only)	0.57 oz (16 g)	-	2 oz (56 g)	0.28 oz (7 g)	1 oz (28 g)

=== Modern ===
==== UK MOD Nutrition Policy Statement ====
Joint Service Publication (JSP) 456 Part 2 Volume 1 of December 2014, the Ministry of Defence policy on nutrition is as follows;

The UK Ministry of Defence (MOD) undertakes to provide military personnel with a basic knowledge of nutrition, with the aim of optimising physical and mental function, long-term health, and morale. Educators will use effective education techniques, and programmes developed by, or in consultation with, registered dieticians and other qualified personnel. Programmes will reflect current nutrition knowledge and scientific research findings, and may contain other appropriate information, such as that provided by the UK Department of Health. Advice on the nutritional needs of pregnant or lactating female military personnel, or individuals requiring nutrition therapy for conditions such as illness, injury, infection, chronic disease, or trauma, will be available from qualified personnel on request. The UK MOD undertakes to provide a variety of healthy and palatable food and beverage choices to military personnel to enable them to adopt healthy eating habits, a balanced diet, and to ensure optimal fitness and performance. Contract caterers will be required to provide food at the point of service that meets these requirements. UK Operational Ration Pack(s) (ORP) will continue to be provided to sustain troops on operations and during field exercises, with the aim of preserving life, preserving both physical and cognitive function, maintaining mood and motivation, preventing fatigue, and speeding up recovery. ORP will be designed to meet the energy and nutrient requirements of military personnel operating for long periods in both temperate and extreme environments. The exception to this will be any form of nutritionally-incomplete survival ration, or restricted ration. The UK MOD has developed UK Military Dietary Reference Values (MDRV) for a range of macro and micro-nutrients. The guidelines are appropriate for the healthy end-user, and are divided into training and operational MDRVs as well as non-operational MDRVs for Adults (19 – 50 years old) and Adolescents (15 – 18 years old).

==== United Kingdom Armed Forces Food Based Standards ====
===== Mandatory food =====
Food/ Food group	Standards
Fruit and vegetables	Provide at least 5 portions of a variety of fruit and vegetables per day.
Bread, rice, potatoes, pasta and other starchy foods.	Provide a variety of starchy foods at every meal. Increase the availability of brown, wholemeal and wholegrain products that are served. Provide a variety of higher fibre breakfast cereals (i.e. more than 6g/100g).
Meat, fish, eggs, beans and other non-dairy sources of protein.	Provide a portion of meat, fish, eggs, beans or other non-dairy source of protein at every meal. Provide two portions of fish a week, of which one portion should be oily fish.
Milk and dairy foods	Provide a portion of milk and/or dairy foods at every meal. Offer low-fat milk, yoghurt and cheese.
Food and drinks low in fat and/or sugar	Offer food and drinks lower in sugar and/or fat. Increase the availability of puddings and desserts that are lower in fat and sugar.
Water	Tap water is visible and freely available.

===== Restricted food =====
Food/ Food group	Standards
Bread, rice, potatoes, pasta and other starchy foods	Starchy food cooked in fat or oil should not be provided more than once per day across lunch and dinner.
Meat, fish, eggs, beans and other non-dairy sources of protein	Processed meat products and pies/pasties made with pastry, combined, should not be provided more than twice per day.
Food and drinks high in fat and/or sugar.	Reduce the availability and use of food and drinks that are high in sugar and/or fat (particularly saturated fat). Only oils and spreads high in polyunsaturated fats should be used during food preparation.
Salt	Salt shall only be provided at the servery or at a central service point.

===== Prohibited food =====
Food/ Food group	Standards
Salt	The caterer should not add salt to food after the cooking process is complete. Vegetables and boiled starchy foods should be cooked without added salt

==== Daily Messing Rate ====
The Daily Messing Rate (DMR) is used to provide the following daily calorific intake;

Daily Messing Rate Type	Calorific Intake
Basic DMR	3000 Kcal
Exercise (Field) DMR.	4000 Kcal
Overseas Exercise (Field) DMR.	4000 Kcal
Operational DMR.	4000 Kcal
Nijmegen Marches.	4000 Kcal
Norway DMR.	5000 Kcal

The current Daily Messing Rate is;

- £2.73 in the United Kingdom
- £3.60 outside the United Kingdom

==== Catering for diversity ====
In accordance with current UK legislation and Government guidelines it is incumbent on the Armed Forces to cater for all personnel irrespective of gender, race, religious belief, medical requirements and committed lifestyle choices.

== United States ==
During the American Revolution, the Continental Congress regulated garrison rations, with one standard outlining the composition as:

One pound of beef, or 3/4 of a pound of pork or one pound of fish, per day. One pound of bread or flour per day. Three pints of peas or beans per week, or vegetables equivalent, at one dollar per bushel for peas or beans. One pint of milk per man per day. One half-pint of rice, or one pint of Indian meal per man per week. One quart of spruce beer, or cider, per man per day, or nine gallons of mollasses per company of one hundred men per week. Three pounds of candles to one hundred men per week, for guards. Twenty pounds of soft, or eight pounds of hard, soap for one hundred men per week.

These proportions changed fairly little until the American Civil War, although the exact contents varied somewhat. In 1863, potatoes were added to the ration at a rate of thirty pounds per hundred rations. The development of early nutrition science in the late 19th century led to changes to rations in 1892 that emphasized a more diverse selection of vegetables in addition to meat and potatoes. The principles behind the garrison ration came under fire after the Spanish–American War, as the long distance between American supply chains and troops fighting in Cuba, Puerto Rico and especially the Philippines left soldiers eating rotten foods and subsisting on canned goods that were made to very poor standards. The American death toll from bad food in that war exceeded combat fatalities.

By World War I, the American garrison ration had improved dramatically, including 137 grams of protein, 129 grams of fat, and 539 grams of carbohydrate every day, with a total of roughly 4,000 calories. However, fresh vegetables were largely absent, and the ration was inadequate in terms of vitamins. Further advances in nutrition led to the replacement of the garrison ration in 1933 with the "New Army ration", which ultimately developed into the rations system described at United States military ration.

Since the WWII era, A-rations and B-rations have been provided as part of garrison rations.

Currently, garrison rations include the Unitized Group Ration and the Navy Standard Core Menu. They are prepared in dining facilities and mess halls using a standard pounds-per-hundred sheet for all meats. They also have standard recipe cards and follow guidelines under TB MED530 for compliance standards.

== See also ==
- Mess
- Mess kit
