= 10-in-1 food parcel =

U.S. military group ration for ten individuals

The 10-in-1 food parcel, commonly known as the 10-in-1 ration, was a United States military ration issued during World War II. As its name implies, the 10-in-1 provided the needs of ten soldiers in a single ration package.

== Development ==
Although the possibility of packing the B ration in units of ten was suggested early into World War II, progress on such an arrangement did not begin until 1943 when the Mountain ration, Jungle ration, and 5-in-1 rations were discontinued. The success of the British "Composite 14-in-1 ration" during the North African campaign in 1942 and the movement to classify field rations into four categories added incentive for development of the 10-in-1 ration. A guide to its rapid development was furnished in the following 1943 definition:

"A small-group field ration [shall be] composed of components of the standard field ration type B (modified to reduce bulk and weight) packed in basic packages of five complete rations each. ... The inner and outer packages are to be proof against water, vapor, moisture, and chemical agents. They are to be of such shape and dimensions as to be suitable for either animal-pack or man-carry, and sufficiently sturdy as to material and construction to withstand normal handling and transportation in motor vehicles, on pack animals or by individual portage."

Specification requirements were quickly published, and the ration was standardized as the replacement for other group rations such as the 5-in-1 ration. Although superseding the 5-in-1, the 10-in-1 was essentially two 5-in-1s packed in one unit. Within such a combination, a greater variety of contents was possible; the number of "menus" was increased to five, compared to the three-menu arrangement of the 5-in-1. In ensuing war years, several revisions were made to the original specification, but their intended purpose of providing one day's food for ten men, remained unaltered. Within the daily plan, complete group meals were specified for breakfast and supper while a partial dinner unit was provided for the luncheon meal.

A typical menu included such canned items as butter-substitute spread, soluble coffee, pudding, meat units, jam, evaporated milk, and vegetables as well as biscuits, cereal, beverages, candy, salt, and sugar. Accessory items were can opener, toilet paper, soap, towels, and water-purification (halazone) tablets. The partial dinner unit was enclosed in a cellophane bag-in-carton for easy distribution to the individual soldier for his noontime meal. Within the unit were biscuits, a confection, beverage powder, sugar, gum, and a can opener. These items were provided on the theory that an individual "snack" was sufficient for midday meals, when there would be neither time nor opportunity to prepare the ration for group feeding.

== Revision ==
The similarity of the partial unit to the K-ration was a chief reason for the proposed revision of the 10-in-1 in 1945. The revised 10-in-1 was intended for use during and after the 1945 planned attack on Japan during World War II. It was planned to eliminate the unit ration concept, and to assemble the entire ration on the basis of three group meals rather than two group meals and one individual luncheon package. Although it was recognized that the overall weight of the ration would be increased thereby, it was felt that the added weight would be offset by the increased acceptability and nutritional value which a greater variety of components would provide. The end of the war prevented realization of such a plan in the 10-in-1, leaving a surplus of food. Through the form of CARE Packages, the humanitarian group CARE provided a means to transfer the ration surplus to those starving in Europe.

Over 300 million rations, costing about 85 cents each, were procured under the 10-in-1 title from mid-1943 to the end of World War II. No other group ration was procured during that period. Hence, in actuality as well as nomenclature, "Ration, 10-in-1" was the final small-group ration of World War II.
