= C-ration =

U.S. military ration of prepared, canned food

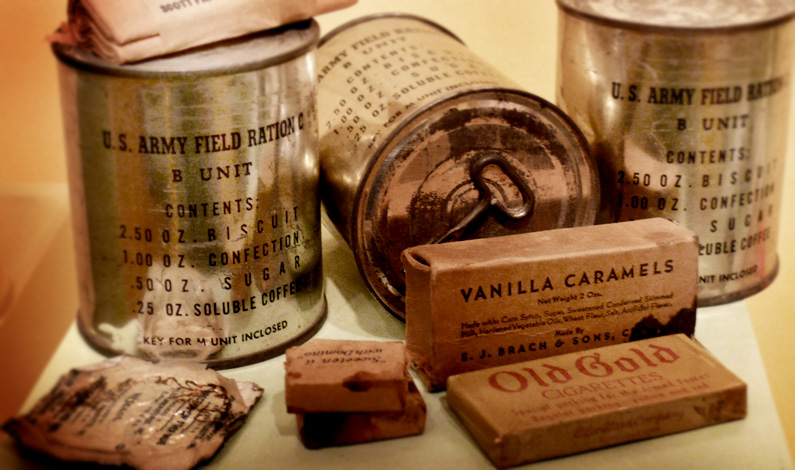
A selection of United States military C-ration cans from World War II with items displayed. Note that the Old Gold cigarettes and vanilla caramels were not part of the C-ration.

The C-ration (officially Field Ration, Type C) was a United States military ration consisting of prepared, canned wet foods. They were intended to be served when fresh or packaged unprepared food was unavailable, and survival rations were insufficient. It was replaced by the similarly canned Meal, Combat, Individual (MCI) in 1958; its modern successor is the retort pouch-based Meal, Ready-to-Eat (MRE), introduced in 1980.

Development of the C-ration began in 1938. The first rations were field-tested in 1940, and wide-scale adoption followed soon after. Operational conditions often caused the C-ration to be standardized for field issue regardless of environmental suitability or weight limitations. Though the C-ration was replaced in 1958, the new MCI was very similar to the C-ration, and was indeed still nicknamed the "C-ration" until its replacement by the MRE in the late 1970s.

The C-ration differs from other American alphabetized rations such as the A-ration, consisting of fresh food; B-ration, consisting of packaged, unprepared food; D-ration, consisting of military chocolate; K-ration, consisting of three balanced meals; and emergency rations, intended for emergencies when other food or rations are unavailable.

== Background and development ==
=== Iron Ration (1907–1922) ===
The first American attempt to make an individual ration for issue to soldiers in the field was the Iron Ration, introduced in 1907. It contained three 3-ounce cakes (made from a concoction of beef bouillon powder and parched, cooked wheat), three 1-ounce bars of sweetened chocolate, and packets of salt and pepper. The ration was issued in a sealed tin packet that weighed one pound, to be carried in an infantryman's top tunic pocket, and was designed for emergency use when the troops were unable to be supplied with food. It was later discontinued by the adoption of the "Reserve Ration", but findings from the development and use of the Iron Ration went into the development of the emergency D-ration.

=== Reserve Ration (1917–1937) ===
The Reserve Ration was issued during the later part of World War I to feed troops who were away from a garrison or field kitchen. It originally consisted of 12 ounces (340 g) of bacon or 14 ounces (400 g) of meat (usually canned corned beef), two 8-ounce (230 g) cans of hard bread or hardtack biscuits, a packet of 1.16 ounces (33 g) of pre-ground coffee, a packet of 2.4 ounces (68 g) of granulated sugar, and a packet of 0.16 ounces (4.5 g) of salt. There was also a separate "tobacco ration" of 0.4 ounces (11 g) of tobacco and 10 cigarette rolling papers, later replaced by brand-name machine-rolled cigarettes.

After the war, there were attempts to improve the ration based on input from the field. In 1922, the ration was reorganized to consist of 16 ounces (450 g) of meat (usually beef jerky), 3 ounces (85 g) of canned corned beef or chocolate, 14 ounces (400 g) of hard bread or hardtack biscuits, coffee and sugar. In 1925, the meat ration was replaced with canned pork and beans. In 1936, there was an attempt at variety by having an "A"-menu of corned beef and a "B"-menu of pork and beans. This was cancelled upon introduction of the new C-ration in 1938.

== Field ration, Type C (1938–1945) ==
The original Type C ration, commonly known as the C-ration, was intended to replace the Reserve Ration as a short-term individual ration designed for short use, to be supplemented by the D-ration emergency ration.

Development of a replacement for the Reserve Ration was undertaken by the newly formed Quartermaster Subsistence Research and Development Laboratory in Chicago in 1938 with the aim of producing a ration that was more palatable, nutritionally balanced, and had better keeping qualities.

The first C-ration consisted of a 16 ounces (450 g) 'meat' unit (M-unit) (reduced to 12 ounces (340 g) after being field tested during the 1941 Louisiana maneuvers). In the initial C-ration, there were only three variations of the main course: meat and beans, meat and potato hash, or meat and vegetable stew. Also issued was one bread-and-dessert can, or B-unit. Each daily ration (i.e. enough food for one soldier for one day) consisted of six 12 oz (340 g) cans (three M-units and three B-units), while an individual meal consisted of one M-unit and one B-unit. The original oblong can was replaced with the more common cylindrical design in June 1939 due to mass production problems with the former shape of can.

The 12 oz (340 g) C-ration can was about 4.4 inches (11 cm) tall and 3 inches (7.6 cm) in diameter. It was made of non-corrugated tinplate, had a visible tin solder seam, and incorporated an opening strip. A key for use on the opening strip was soldered to the base of every B unit can.

The first C-ration cans had an aluminized finish, but in late 1940, this was changed to a gold lacquer finish to improve corrosion resistance. There was noticeable variation in the depth of gold color in World War II vintage cans, because of the large number of suppliers involved. Late in the war this was changed to drab green paint, which remained standard through the remainder of the C-ration's service life, as well as that of the MCI.

During the war, soldiers frequently requested that the cylindrical cans be replaced with flat, rectangular ones (similar to a sardine can), comparable to those used in the earliest versions of contemporary K rations, because of their compactness and packability; but this was deemed impractical because of the shortage of commercial machinery available to produce rectangular cans. After 1942 the K ration too, reverted to the use of small round cans.

Initially, C-ration cans were marked only with paper labels, which soon fell off and made a guessing game out of evening meals; US Soldiers and Marines receiving an unpopular menu item several nights in a row often found themselves powerless to bargain for a more palatable one.

The C-ration was, in general, not well liked by U.S. Army or Marine forces in World War II, who found the cans heavy and cumbersome, and the menu monotonous after a short period of time. There were also inevitable problems with product consistency given the large number of suppliers involved and the pressures of wartime production. When issued to British or other Commonwealth forces formerly issued hardtack and bully beef-type rations, the C-ration was initially accepted, but monotony also became a chief complaint after a few days of consumption. Australian forces tended to dislike the C-ration, finding the canned food items generally bland, overly soft in texture, and unappealing. Originally intended only for infrequent use, the exigencies of combat sometimes forced supply authorities to make the C-ration the only source of sustenance for several weeks in succession. In 1943, a ration board reviewing medical examinations of soldiers after long-term use of C-rations recommended that they be restricted to a maximum of five continuous days in the absence of supplementation with other rations.

While the initial specification was officially declared obsolete in 1945, and production of all Type C rations ended in 1958, existing stockpiles of both original and revised Type C rations continued to be issued to troops serving in Korea and even as late as the Vietnam War. A Marine tank commander serving in Vietnam in 1968 noted his unit was frequently supplied with older stocks of C-rations, complete with early 1950s dates on the cans.

=== "M" Unit ===
The M-unit contained a canned entrée originally made of stew meat (a mixture of beef and pork) seasoned with salt, various spices, and chopped onions. They initially came in three varieties: Meat Stew with Beans, Meat with Vegetable Hash, and Meat Stew with Vegetables (carrots and potatoes). The commonplace nature of the menu was intentional, and designed to duplicate the menu items (e.g., hash, stews, etc.) soldiers were normally served as A- or B-rations in Army mess halls.

Another new menu item, "Meat & Spaghetti in Tomato Sauce", was added in 1943. In late 1944 "Chopped Ham, Egg, and Potato", "Meat and Noodles", "Pork and Rice", "Frankfurters and Beans", "Pork and Beans", "Ham and Lima Beans", and "Chicken and Vegetables" were introduced in an attempt to increase the C-rations' period of continuous use. The unpopular Meat Hash and equally unpopular experimental "Mutton Stew with Vegetables" meal were dropped. In the final revision, "Beef Stew with Vegetables" was added in 1945. By all accounts, after the meat hash and mutton stew, the Ham and Lima Beans entrée was the most unpopular; despite continued negative field reports, it inexplicably remained a standard entrée item not only during World War II, but also during the Korean War and Vietnam War.

=== "B" Unit ===
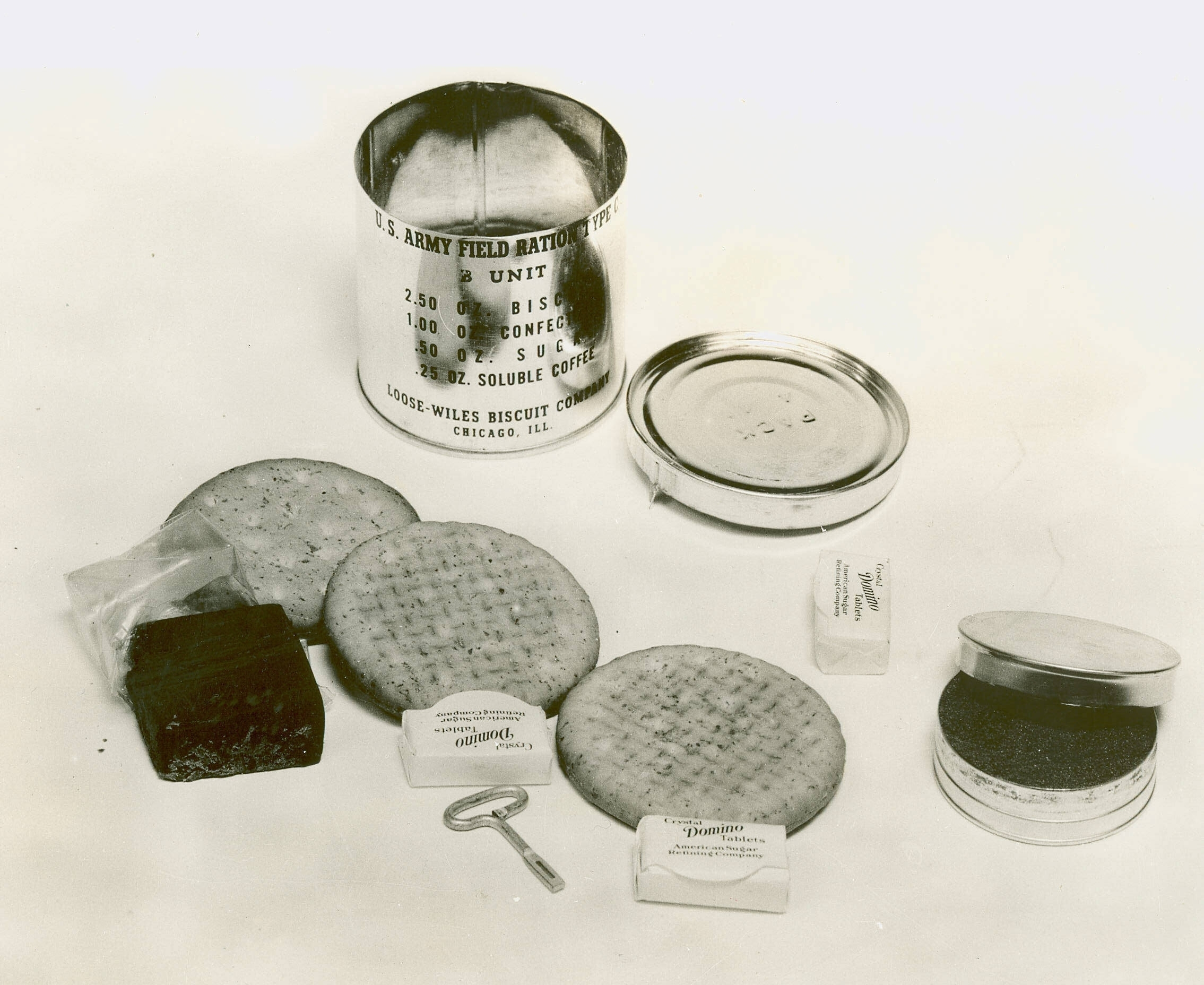
An opened 1941 B unit with contents: cellophane wrapped chocolate fudge, three biscuits, three pressed sugar cubes, and a small tin of instant coffee

The B-unit (bread and dessert portion) contained several calorie-dense crackers, 3 sugar tablets, 3 dextrose energy tablets, and a packet or small can of beverage mix (instant coffee; powdered synthetic lemon drink, containing the rations' main source of vitamin C; or bouillon soup powder). Later revisions added orange drink powder (1944), sweetened cocoa powder (1944), and grape drink powder (1945), all enriched with vitamin C, to the list of beverages. In 1941, the energy tablets were replaced with loose candy, such as candy-coated peanuts or raisins, Charms hard candy, or Brachs chocolate or vanilla caramels. Due to spoilage, the loose candy was replaced in 1944 with a chocolate disk (e.g., Brachs fudge disk) or a cookie sandwich (e.g., Jim Dandee), and the number of biscuits was reduced to 4.

Another B-unit, consisting of pre-mixed oatmeal cereal, was introduced in 1944 as a breakfast ration that was usually paired with the "Ham, Egg, and Potato" Meal.

=== Accessory pack ===
The inclusion of additional accessories and condiments led to the development of an accessory package.

The brown butcher paper accessory pack contained sugar tablets, halazone water purification tablets (for a brief period in 1945), a flat wooden spoon, a piece of candy-coated chewing gum, 3 "short" sample 3-packs or one "long" sample 9-pack of commercial-grade cigarettes and a book of 20 cardboard moisture-resistant matches, a paper-wrapped P-38 can opener printed with instructions for its proper use, and typically 22.5 sheets of toilet paper (compared to 3 sheets for the British Army). The P-38 can openers were generally worn on the GI's "dog tag" chain for convenience.

In 1945, the accessory pack was modified. Per the order of the Surgeon General, the halazone tablets were removed and salt tablets were added. Also, feedback from the field revealed that some soldiers opened up accessory packs just to get the cigarettes and threw away the rest of the items. To reduce waste, the accessory pack was now divided into the short pack with cigarettes and matches, and the long pack containing the other accessories.

Cigarette brands issued included Camel, Chelsea, Chesterfield, Craven A, Lucky Strike, Old Gold, Philip Morris, Player's, Raleigh, and Wings.

=== Crates ===
The rations came packed in a small rectangular wooden crate that weighed 40 lbs. and had a volume of 1.12 cubic feet. Each crate contained 8 daily rations of 3 meals each for a total of 24 M-units, 24 B-units, and 24 accessory packs.

Early rations came with a variety of 8 Meat and Beans, 8 Meat & Vegetable Hash, and 8 Meat & Vegetable Stew M-units and 24 B-units. Later rations (c. 1944–1945) added a breakfast meal of 8 Chopped Ham, Egg, & Potato M-units and 8 Compressed Cereal B-units in place of the Meat and Vegetable Hash. Alternate M-unit menu items came packed in cases of 24 M-units (and 24 B-units) rather than a mixed 8-8-8 menu like the main items.

== Field ration, Type E (1946–1948) ==
After World War II there was an attempt to combine the best features of the C-ration and the K-ration into a new individual ration. Called the E-ration, it was for all intents and purposes the same canned C-ration, with the addition of some new components. In field testing, the bread component of the E-ration was found to be so unpalatable that the E-ration was quickly dropped from classification and inventory.

== Ration, Individual, Combat, Type C (Revised) (1948–1958) ==
After the failure of the E-ration, ration planners decided to save costs by returning to the basic C-ration designation, intermittently revised with new menus and item specifications.

=== Type C-2 ration (1948–1951) ===
The C-2 ration was described in TB-QM-53, Department of the Army, dated March 1948, as an individual ration which consisted of packaged pre-cooked foods which could be eaten hot or cold. It replaced the World War II C-ration, and later, the short-lived E-ration. It could be carried and prepared by the individual soldier. The revised C-ration was now intended for feeding combat troops continuously, up to three weeks (21 days). Due to the required individual portability of this ration, maximum nourishment had to be provided in the smallest physical unit. The components of this ration were prepared in five different menus.

Each menu included an accessory packet which consisted of essential toilet articles, tobacco, and confections.

=== Type C-3 ration (1951–1953) ===
In 1951, a new C-3 menu for the C-ration was introduced. The C-3 ration was composed of the same five menus of the C-2, but offered greater variety. In addition to new and improved “B” (bread) and “M” (meat) units, each menu contained an accessory packet, fruit, and cigarettes. The ration was very heavy, weighing 5 lbs. 8.5 oz. [2.5 kg.], and was packed in 8 small cans in a cardboard box. There were 6 daily ration boxes per cardboard case.

- Three “M” (meat) components, which offered 10 different varieties of meat entrées.
  - Chopped Eggs and Ham
  - Pork and Beans
  - Meat Chunks and Beans
- Three “B” (bread) components consisting of:
  - B-1: a unit of 5 crackers, a packet of soluble coffee, a packet of powdered milk, a packet of granulated sugar, a cocoa disc, and a 1.5 oz (43 g) tin of jam.
  - B-2: a unit of 5 crackers, a packet of soluble coffee, a packet of powdered milk, a packet of granulated sugar, 1 cookie sandwich, and 1 chocolate fudge disc.
  - B-3: a unit of 5 crackers, a packet of soluble coffee, a packet of powdered milk, a packet of granulated sugar, 2 cookie sandwiches, and a 1.5 oz (43 g) tin of jam.
  - B-4: a unit of pre-mixed and compressed cereal.
- One 12 oz (340 g) can of fruit.
- One sundries can containing the accessory packet (chewing gum, toilet paper, a P-38 can opener, granulated salt, and a flat wooden spoon) and the cigarette packet (one 9-pack of cigarettes and a book of matches).

Field cooking equipment was not required for the preparation of this ration. The C-3 ration was more adequate than the original C-ration in respect to its nutritional value.

=== Type C-4 ration (1954–1958) ===
In 1954, the C-4 ration was developed as a modification of the C-3 ration, and was called Ration, Combat, Individual. It included the issue of two 6-ounce (170 g) cans of fruit for 2 meals to replace the one 12-ounce (340 g) can issued for one meal in the C-3 ration.

A sample C-4 ration (stamped March 1954) contained:

- 1 instruction sheet
- 2 cheese bars (1.5 net ounces/43 g net)
- 2 cereal class 5 bars (1.5 net ounces/43 g net)
- 3 type XII style 1 enriched chocolate bars (1 ounce/28 g)
- 1 jelly bar (2 ounces/56 g)
- 2 fruit cake bars (2 ounces/56 g)
- 3 sticks Topps peppermint chewing gum
- 3 Domino sugar packets
- 3 Nestea "soluble tea product" packets
- 1 packet of pure soluble sugar
- 1 packet of soluble cream product
- 1 bottle water purification tablets (iodine)
- 1 plastic bag

== End of the C-ration ==
At its introduction, the QMC stated that the C-ration was intended for short-term use for periods not to exceed three days. After the war, in light of field evaluation reports of monotony, the QMC Food Services Branch used this limitation as a defense to the largely negative response to the C-ration during the war, while at the same time advocating standardization on the C-ration as the sole individual packaged ration for U.S. troops. Not only did the QMC decide not to develop or introduce new alternative lightweight individual rations, it successfully campaigned for the elimination of alternatives, including the K-ration, Mountain ration, Jungle ration, and the 10-in-1 group ration (which had proven somewhat useful in boosting nourishment and alleviating complaints of monotony for men living for extended periods on C-rations or K-rations).

Instead, the C-ration, still designated as a packaged ration intended for infrequent or short-term use, went through a series of largely unsuccessful minor revisions. This decision resulted in limiting troops in the field to a single class of packaged ration that despite meal variances was neither suited to varied field environments nor for long-term use. Troops continued to complain of the monotony of a single class of field ration with one or more unpalatable menu items, especially where A and B rations were not available for extended periods.

Primarily implemented due to cost concerns, the selection of a heavy canned wet ration resulted in a severe weight penalty for troops marching on foot and forced to carry a multi-day supply of rations. The overuse of the canned wet ration reached an extreme during the Vietnam War, where American troops resorted to placing stacked ration cans in socks to save bulk and reduce noise on patrol, while their enemy increased their mobility by carrying lightweight rations of dry rice. The Quartermaster Branch's insistence on canned wet rations for all postwar field issue and the failure to develop a suitable lightweight dehydrated or other dry ration for jungle and other extreme environments led directly to the hurried development of the LRP ration or Long Range Patrol ration in 1966.

Starting in 1958, C-rations were slowly replaced by the nearly identical canned Meal, Combat, Individual ration. These rations were issued for most of the next two plus decades, until they were replaced by Meal Ready to Eat or MREs in the Mid 1980s.

== Influence ==
The C-rations during the Korean War led later to the introduction of instant coffee to South Korea.

== See also ==
- 5-in-1 ration
- K-ration
- Meal, Combat, Individual ration
- United States military ration
