= 5-in-1 ration =

U.S. military group ration for five individuals

The 5-in-1 ration was a United States military ration issued from 1942 to the end of World War II. As its name implies, the 5-in-1 provided the needs of five soldiers in a single ration package. Procurement ended with the war, though remaining stocks were issued to troops after the war, as well as distributed as surplus in civilian feeding programs overseas. The 5-in-1 specification remained in effect after the war, and was again used in 1948 for a new field ration.

== Development, adoption, and use ==
The 5-in-1 was developed in 1942 by the Subsistence Research Laboratory (SRL) of the U.S. Army Quartermaster Corps to fulfill a need for a pre-packaged field ration for use by small motorized combat groups. The 5-in-1 allowed small groups of soldiers or large groups divided into multiple units to cook meals without the need of complex kitchen utensils or cooking skill. Another objective was to furnish sufficient food to take care of five men for one day. The U.S. Quartermaster Corps' Subsistence Branch originally planned for the rations to be used by troops without immediate kitchen facilities, such as trains without kitchen cars, motorized infantry, armored vehicle crews, or gun crews.

Unlike the Mountain ration or Jungle ration, the 5-in-1 was a ration developed solely by the SRL. The 5-in-1's components were packed as a group, with noncanned components placed in a separate carton overpacked in a larger carton with the canned products. Menus were enclosed in the carton as a guide in the selection of meals.

By mid-1943, the ration was the most successful field ration in use in North Africa. In that same year, the 10-in-1 ration was developed to replace it, as it offered a wider menu and greater flexibility in small unit issue. Extensive procurement of the 5-in-1 ended the same year. However, use of 5-in-1 stocks continued throughout the war, and the ration was still in distribution when hostilities ended.

Though procurement of the 5-in-1 had ended with the war, the specification remained in effect and later became the basis for a postwar revision in 1948, under which the 5-in-1 nomenclature was reestablished.

== Contents ==
The 5-in-1 ration contained:

- Beverages
- Butter spread
- 10 varieties of canned meat combinations
- Canned bread or type V biscuits
- Can openers
- Cellulose tape
- Cereal
- Cheese spread
- Dehydrated soups
- 5 varieties of jam
- Evaporated milk
- Fruit
- Fruit juice
- Hard candy
- Paper towels
- 3 varieties of pudding
- Soap
- Sponge
- Sugar
- Toilet paper
- 6 varieties of vegetables
- Water-purification tablets

== See also ==
- 10-in-1 ration
- K ration
- C-ration
- D ration
- B-ration
- Jungle ration
- Mountain ration
