= Meal, Combat, Individual ration =

U.S. military canned combat rations

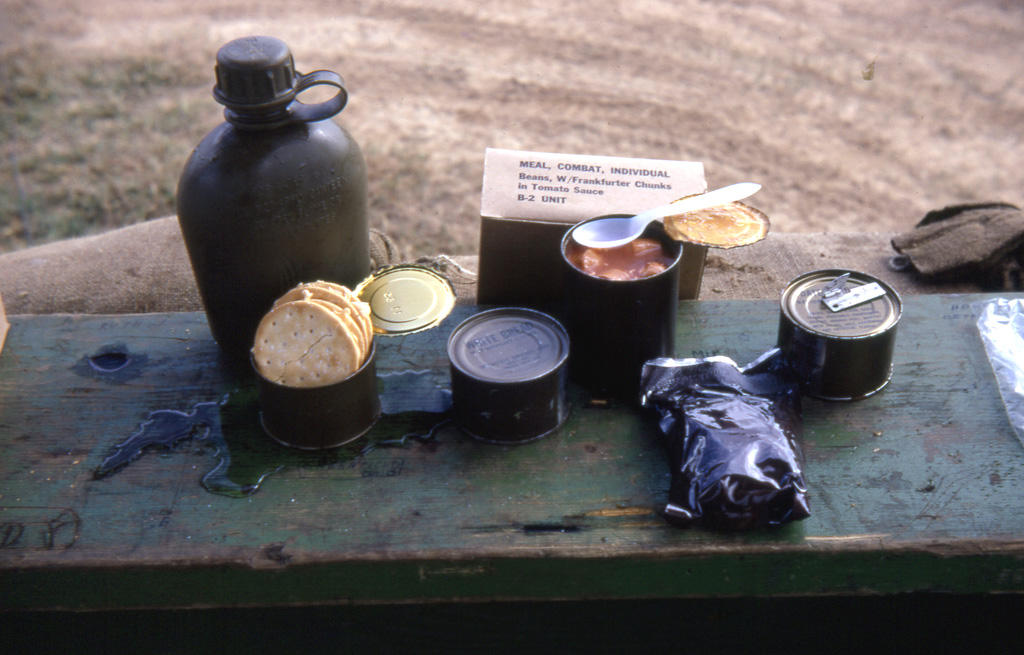
Elements of a United States Military Meal, Combat, Individual ration, as served in Da Nang, South Vietnam, during the Vietnam War, 1966 or 1967

The Meal, Combat, Individual (MCI) was a United States military ration of canned and preserved food, issued from 1958 to 1980. It replaced the earlier C-ration, to which it was so similar to that it was often nicknamed the "C-ration", despite the term never being used officially. The MCI was eventually superseded by the Meal, Ready-to-Eat (MRE) in 1980, with retort pouches replacing the cans, contained in a cardboard box for lighter weight.

== Development and packaging ==
Despite the new name, the MCI was still popularly referred within the military as the C-ration. The MCI was intended as a modest improvement over the earlier canned C-ration, with inclusion of additional menu items to reduce monotony and encourage adequate daily feeding and nutrition. Heavy for their content, they were eventually phased out in favor of the Meal, Ready-to-Eat (MRE). Although the MRE was formally adopted as the Department of Defense combat ration in 1975, the first large-scale production test of the MRE did not occur until 1978, with the first MRE I rations packed and delivered to Army stores in 1981. MCI rations continued to be issued when the MRE was introduced until inventories were depleted.

There are least 12 different menus.

Each contains one canned meat-based entree item; one canned fruit or dessert; one B unit (with crackers and a cocoa beverage or candy); one can of spread (peanut butter, jam, or cheese); a plastic spoon; and an accessory packet holding coffee, cream substitute, sugar, salt, and chewing gum, along with matches and toilet paper. Each carton contained a single complete meal providing approximately 5,000 kJ (1,200 kilocalories or 1,200 kcal), with a packaged weight of 1.2 kilograms (2.6 lb), but weight (less shipping crate) of 1.81 lbs, and volume of 1.5 litres (0.053 cu ft). Each packing case weighed 25 to 26 pounds (11 to 12 kg) and had a volume of 0.8713 cubic feet (24.67 L).

The MCI consisted of a rectangular cardboard carton containing one small flat can, one large can, and two small cans. It consisted of an "M"-unit can (meat-based entree item), a "B"-unit (bread item) composed of the Crackers & Candy Can and the flat Spread Can, and a "D"-unit can (fruit or dessert item). The M-1, M-3, B-1, B-2, D-2, and D-3 unit cans were small and the M-2, B-3, and D-1 unit cans were large. The ration cans were packed upright, with the flat Spread can over the large can on the left side and the two small cans were stacked one over the other on the right side (the lighter one over the heavier one). On top was the brown foil Accessory Pack and a white plastic spoon wrapped in clear plastic.

The label of the ration carton was printed across the lid of the rectangular box in three rows. The first row always read "MEAL, COMBAT, INDIVIDUAL". The second row indicated the name of the meat unit in bold capital block letters (e.g., "TURKEY LOAF") and the third row indicated the "B"-unit number (either B-1, B-1A, B-2 or B-3, B-3A, Unit) in bold capital block letters. Sometimes there was a smaller fourth line of type at the very bottom of the cover that either indicated the contractor who made the ration or the manufacturer that made the cardboard box itself.

The ration boxes were shipped in a rectangular cardboard packing case. Each packing case contained 12 ration cartons (containing one of each meal) packed in two rows of six rations. They were grouped in three menus of four meals each, organized by their "B"-unit (B-1, B-2, and B-3). It also contained four paper-wrapped P-38 can openers to open the cans. Early cases were bound with baling wire, but late Vietnam War and post-war cases were bound in plastic strapping.

== Menus ==
=== Meat unit ===
The "M" unit came in 12 basic varieties grouped in three menus of four different entrees (later supplemented by "alternative" variant entrees). Taking into account slight differences in preparation or meat, a total of 18 entrees were available over time:

- M-1: Beefsteak, Turkey Loaf, Chopped Ham & Eggs, or Ham Slices (Cooked in Juices or Fried).
  - M-1A: Tuna fish.
- M-2: Meat Chunks w/ Beans in Tomato Sauce, Ham & Lima Beans, Beef Slices w/ Potatoes in Gravy ('Beef and Boulders'), or Beans w/. Frankfurter Chunks in Tomato Sauce.
  - M-2A: Spaghetti w/ Meatballs in Tomato Sauce.
- M-3: Beef in Spiced Sauce, Boned Chicken or Turkey, Chicken w/ Noodles in Broth, or Pork Steak Cooked in Juices.
  - M-3A: None.

Ham and Lima Beans was colloquially known throughout the armed forces as "Ham and Motherfuckers" (or other variants such as "Beans and Motherfuckers", "Ham & Claymores", "Ham & Lifers"). Beans with Frankfurter Chunks in Tomato Sauce was called "Beanie Weenie" or "Beans and Baby Dicks".

=== Bread unit ===
The "B" unit came in three different varieties:

- B-1: Four Crackers and a Chocolate Fudge Disk. (Types: Solid Chocolate "also known as Lifer Bars", Chocolate Creme, Chocolate Vanilla Creme, or Chocolate Coconut).
  - Peanut Butter Spread.
- B-2: Three Crackers with Cocoa Beverage powder.
- B-3: Four Crackers and Two Chocolate Disk.
- B Unit Packaging: The Insides of the can had a wax paper circle around the Crackers or Sandwich Cookies. A wax paper disc to separate the Crackers and Sandwich Cookies from the Jams, Cheese Spread, Fudge Discs, and Chocolate Discs.

=== Dessert unit ===
The "D" unit came in three different types:

- D-1 (Fruit): Halved Apricots, Sliced Peaches, Quartered or Halved Pears, Pineapple Bits, or Fruit Cocktail.
  - D-1A (Fruit): Applesauce.
- D-2 (Cake): Pound Cake,Pecan Cake Roll, Chocolate Nut Roll Fruitcake, or Cinnamon Nut Roll.
  - D-2A (Cake): Date Pudding or Orange Nut Roll.
- D-3 (Bread): White Bread.
  - D-3A (Bread): None

=== Spread Unit ===
- S-1: Peanut Butter
  - S-1A: None
- S-2 (Cheese) Plain Cheddar, Smoked Hickory, Caraway Seeds, or Pimento Pepper
  - S-2A: None
- S-3 :(Jam) Seedless Blackberry, Grape, Pineapple, Apricot, or Peach
  - S-3A: None

Each menu was grouped by their unit number (i.e., M-1, B-1, S-1, and D-1 items were grouped together). Alternative items (designated with an "A" suffix) were introduced to provide variety and reduce the monotony. For variety, the M-1 and M-3 units (since they both used small cans) were often switched.

The "B"-unit's Crackers & Candy tin was lined with a piece of corrugated cardboard to protect the contents from damage. In the "D"-unit, the white bread came in one solid cylindrical piece wrapped in wax paper, while the pound cake, fruitcake, Orange Nut Roll, and Cinnamon Nut Roll, and Date Pudding came wrapped in paper wrappers like cupcakes.

The Accessory Pack came with salt, sugar, instant coffee, non-dairy creamer, two pieces of candy-coated chewing gum, a packet of toilet paper, a four-pack of commercial-grade cigarettes, and a book of 20 cardboard moisture-proof matches.

Typical commercial brands issued in the cigarette ration were: Camel, Chesterfield, Kent, Kool, Lucky Strike, Marlboro, Pall Mall, Salem, or Winston. Due to health concerns, cigarettes were eliminated from the accessory packs in 1972.

=== Repackaging ===
In 1967 there were changes in packaging to help standardize the ration. The B-1 and B3 cans were now all small sized and the B-1 was the same as the B-1A and the B-3 was the same as the B-3A

=== Postwar additions ===
The B-3 unit added a Chocolate With Peanuts discs. The D-2 units added a Chocolate Nut Roll.

=== Field reports ===
Although the MCI had been designed as improvement over the earlier Type C or C ration of World War II and Korea, with the inclusion of additional menu items, it was still designed for infrequent use, to be regularly supplemented with fresh Type A (Garrison) and canned Type B (Field Kitchen) rations. This goal was rarely achieved in the field, and some Army and Marine forces in Vietnam would operate for two weeks or more while consuming only the MCI ration or other processed, canned foods.

The new ration had some curious superstitions attached to it during the Vietnam War. The "Ham & Lima Beans" entree, disliked since Korea, was detested by U.S. soldiers and Marines, who considered even pronouncing the correct name brought bad luck, instead calling it "Ham and Motherfuckers". US Marines, paratroops, infantrymen, and armored vehicle crewmen, particularly AMTRAC (Amphibious Tractor) personnel, believed that halved apricots were bad luck to eat during combat operations. The peanut butter issued in the B-1 unit was unappetizing to some and was often discarded, but was consumed by those with diarrhea, as it was certain to stop a case of "the runs". Soldiers in Special Operations units hoarded B-1 peanut butter in empty ration cans to make improvised smoke candles while on long patrols. Being extremely oily, the peanut butter burned with ease, and could be used to boil water for coffee, although it left a greasy black stain on the bottom of the canteen cup.

Other menu items were more popular, such as the pound cake, canned pears, and the spaghetti & meatballs. In 1973, Marine helicopter pilot Henry Moak was issued a MCI ration during his stay in Vietnam. Included in the MCI ration was a can of pound cake, manufactured in 1969. He kept the unopened can, and (having since switched branches), vowed to eat the pound cake when he retired from the Army. On July 24, 2009, with news media and dignitaries in attendance, Colonel Moak opened the forty-year-old can and ate the contents. He noted that the pound cake still looked and smelled like fresh pound cake.

Throughout the Marine Corps 'Beef Slices w/ Potatoes' were known as "Beef and Rocks" due to their half-cooked texture caused by the chemically maintained integrity of the potato slices to prevent disintegration during storage and "Beans with Frankfurter Chunks in Tomato Sauce" were more commonly referred to as "Beans and Baby Dicks". While Marines in general praised pound cake, particularly with fruit cocktail, most detested fruitcake and generally handed it off to less discriminating unit members. Within the Army during the Vietnam War, 'Beef Slices w/ Potatoes' were often referred to as "Beef and Shrapnel".

== Improvised stove ==
The small "B"-unit can was often made into an improvised field stove (known as the "C-rat boonie stove") that could be carried in the cargo pockets of a set of combat fatigues. This was done by making a series of diagonal cuts around the top and bottom edges of the can with a P-38 can opener or a standard can opener to allow the trioxane fuel tablet to burn evenly and warm the entrée. Small balls of C-4 plastic explosive were often substituted for the fuel tablet. Heating of canned meat items was often accomplished by inserting the can into the exhaust of a running truck where it would jam into the curved exhaust pipe end, warming it to a palatable temperature and de-congealing the grease. A second variation that was used by those with ready access to diesel fuel was to take a "church key" (also a needed item to open drinks cans) and make the same series of holes around the top sides of the can. Then, cardboard from the packaging box would be rolled up and placed into the can so that it just came to the top of the can. The can is dipped into the fuel tank of a source of diesel fuel, then lighted. The cardboard acted as a wick for the fuel and the can can be used to heat the rations as well as make tea or coffee. One "stove" was good for at least three or more men to heat their meal and make their coffee with one fueling.

== End of the MCI ration ==
External videos
- “Comparing C-Rations to MREs Sgt. Neil Gussman”

Though it had been given a new name, the MCI was in essence still the canned C ration of prior years. Selecting the MCI ration for all field issue resulted in limiting troops in the field to a single class of heavy wet packaged ration that despite meal variances, was simply not suitable for extended consumption. As they had in World War II and Korea, soldiers and Marines regularly complained of the monotony of a single class of field ration, especially where field mess A and B rations were not available for extended periods of time. Despite the inclusion of additional menu items, the MCI was still designed only for "infrequent use" (unlike later individual rations, which would be required to pass a new field test of seven consecutive days of consumption as the sole diet without complaints of monotony).

The overuse of the canned ration culminated during the Vietnam War, where American troops frequently resorted to the extreme of placing stacked ration cans inside empty G.I. socks to save bulk and reduce noise on patrol, while enemy forces improved mobility by carrying lightweight rations of dry rice in scarves. Primarily implemented due to cost concerns, the decision to standardize on a single canned wet individual ration resulted in a severe weight penalty for troops marching on foot through the jungles of Vietnam while carrying a multi-day supply of MCI cans, adversely affecting combat readiness and increasing soldier fatigue (a typical complete individual ration of cans for one day weighed five and a half pounds). Many combat soldiers and Marines, already overburdened, carried the minimum amount to save weight on operations until the next resupply drop; when the drop was delayed, they went hungry.

The failure of the Quartermaster Corps and its Subsistence Branch to develop a suitable lightweight general-purpose ration after World War II, combined with the absence of a dehydrated, very lightweight dry ration for jungle environments led directly to the hurried development of the Long Range Patrol, or LRP ration in 1966.
