= Jungle ration =

Specialized U.S. military ration

The Jungle Ration (or "J-Ration") was a dry, lightweight United States military ration developed by the U.S. Army during World War II for soldiers on extended missions in tropical regions.

== Origins, development, and use ==
Prior to World War II, during field exercises in Panama and other jungle regions, it was determined that standard heavy canned or 'wet' rations were unsuited to soldiers on foot carrying out extended missions in jungle or tropical environments with an abundance of water sources. Testing in Panama by units of the U.S. Army showed that a dry ration that could be easily decanted into waterproof bags for individual use would best suit jungle infantrymen carrying their own supplies while on foot, to be rehydrated as necessary from local water sources.

The Jungle ration was originally based on foods carried by American civilians, such as geologists and engineers, prior to World War II. Lightweight, ready-to-eat dry foods appealing to American palates and selected for their bulk when rehydrated were included in the menu, such as dried beef, peaches, apricots, and dehydrated whole milk. Water purification tablets were carried to purify the water required for rehydration and drinking purposes. After extensive field testing in the Panamanian jungles, the Jungle ration was finalized at the U.S. Army Quartermaster Branch's Subsistence Research Laboratory (SRL) in Chicago, Illinois, resulting in a daily energy total of about 4,000 kilocalories (17,000 kilojoules), and weighing about 1 kilogram (2 pounds) when packaged for shipping.

The Jungle ration was designed to be compact and to feed four men in one day. A can opener, matches, toilet paper, and cigarettes were packed in each 10-ration waterproof box. In the original issue of the Jungle ration, all food components were dried or dehydrated and could be decanted from their tins or packages into individually carried lightweight waterproof bags. This practice greatly decreased the total weight, yet the foods would still keep for several weeks in jungle heat and humidity. In general, it was favorably accepted by soldiers during experiments with the testing platoons in Panama. Among Australian forces, who were briefly issued the ration in New Guinea, the Jungle ration became known as "the Christmas package" for its varied components, which were appreciated after a steady diet of hardtack and tins of corned beef.

Because of its expense and specialized nature, the Jungle ration, like the Mountain ration, was never popular with the U.S. Army's Quartermaster Command, who were forced to expend additional funds for procurement and storage of what they viewed as an overly expensive, redundant, and limited-issue field ration. The Subsistence Research Laboratory staff criticized the Jungle ration for not being packaged from the processor for immediate distribution to an individual soldier fighting in a foxhole or other defensive position, as for example, the K ration. This criticism arose as a result of the Army and Quartermaster Corps' failure to incorporate previous infantry field reports and test data to SRL staff and dieticians. As none of the SRL personnel had ever served as infantry foot soldiers carrying their own loads through jungle terrain, they were unaware that the primary rationale of the Jungle ration was to provide a palatable, lightweight dry ration that could be broken down and carried in waterproof bags for extended patrols in heavy jungle.

During its short existence, the Jungle ration was repeatedly altered with heavier, less expensive canned components by the SRL at the direction of Quartermaster Corps staff, defeating the purpose of a lightweight dehydrated ration. Replacement of the dried beef component with processed, tinned pork or beef in 1942, followed by elimination of the dried fruit component, caused a predictable reduction in the popularity of the Jungle ration. It was discontinued completely in 1943 in favor of the K ration. The absence of a lightweight, yet sufficiently nourishing and palatable compact field ration had serious consequences for some U.S. troops later in the war, most notably the soldiers of Merrill's Marauders.

== Menu contents ==
The jungle ration was repeatedly altered during its existence, as Quartermaster Corps officers substituted less expensive or heavier canned components (such as evaporated milk). Some known components include:

- Biscuits (Hardtack)
- Salted beef (1st issue) – A U.S. version of traditional Central and South American carne seca, using dried high-quality cuts of beef, lightly salted and spiced; this component was one of the first to be eliminated in favor of cheaper, heavier canned meats
- Canned meat (2nd issue) – tinned beef/pork or pork loaf; some sources indicate pork luncheon meat (Spam) was also a rotating component
- Porridge – (a general term for Grapenuts or other precooked dry cereal)
- Fruit bars
- Chewing gum
- Hard candy
- Dried apricots
- Dried peaches
- Lemon powder
- Cocoa powder (usually combined with powdered milk and sugar to make a chocolate drink)
- Roasted salted peanuts
- Whole powdered milk
- Raisins
- Salt
- Black pepper
- Instant coffee
- White sugar
- Cigarettes
- Toilet paper

== See also ==
- LRP ration (A dehydrated 1960s ration)
- Mountain ration
- K-ration
- B-Ration
- C ration
- 5-in-1 ration
