= K-ration =

U.S. military three-course assault ration

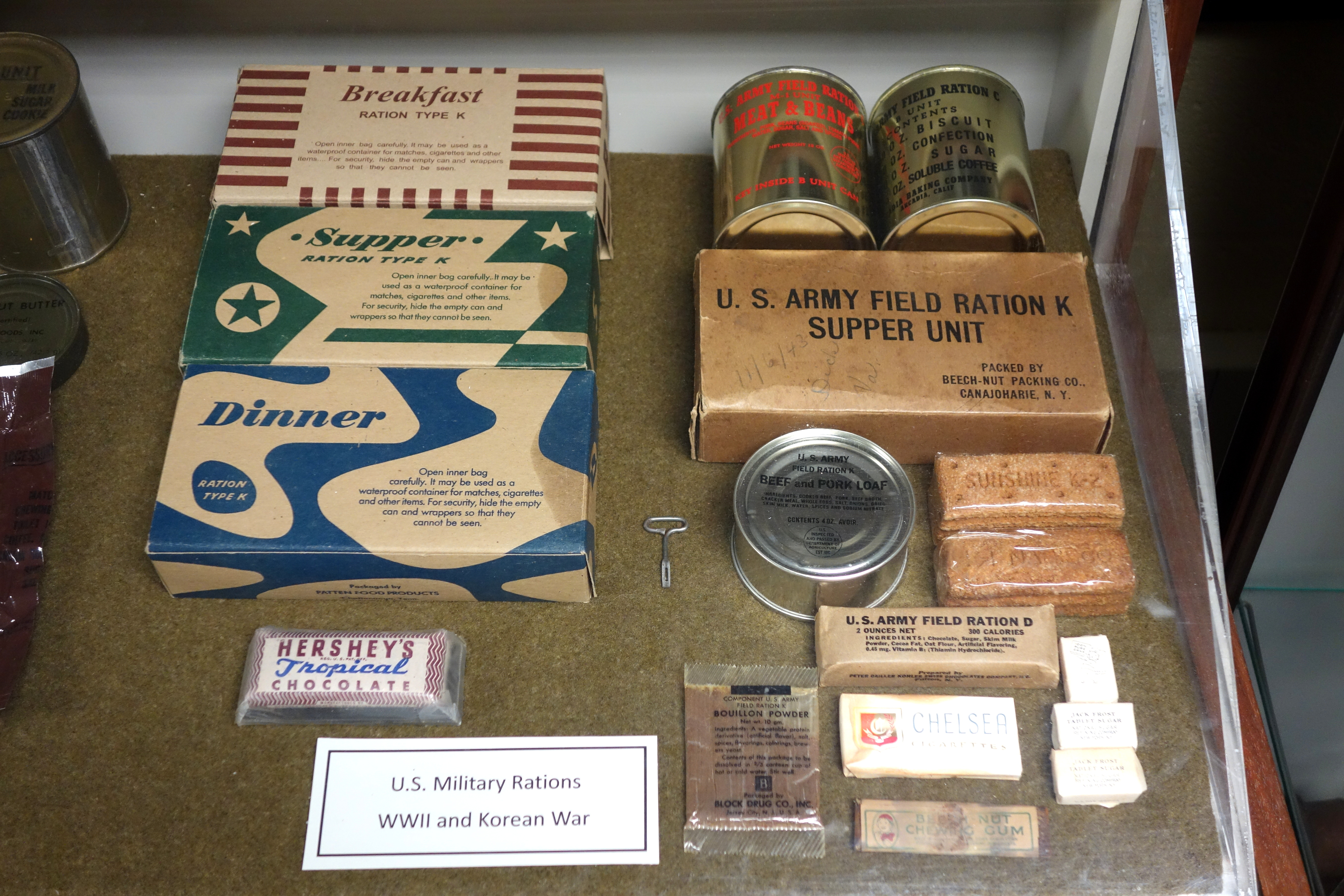
Packaging of K-rations used during World War II and the Korean War on display at Fort Devens

The K-ration was a United States military ration consisting of three separately boxed meal units: breakfast, dinner, and supper.crews, motorcycle couriers, and other mobile forces for short durations.

The K-ration differs from other American alphabetized rations such as the A-ration, consisting of fresh food; B-ration, consisting of packaged, unprepared preserved food; C-ration, consisting of prepared, canned food; D-ration, consisting of military chocolate; and emergency rations, intended for emergencies when other food or rations are unavailable.

== History ==
In 1941, Ancel Keys, a University of Minnesota physiologist, was assigned by the U.S. War Department to design a non-perishable, ready-to-eat meal that could fit in a soldier's pocket as a short-duration, individual ration. Keys went to a local supermarket to choose foods that would be inexpensive, but still be enough to provide energy. He purchased hard biscuits, dry sausages, hard candy, and chocolate bars. He then tested his 28-ounce (800-gram), 3,200-kilocalorie (13,000-kilojoule) meals on six soldiers in a nearby U.S. Army base. The meals only gained "palatable" and "better than nothing" ratings from the soldiers, but were successful in relieving hunger and providing sufficient energy. The new rations were initially intended as individual rations suitable for short durations only, to be used for a maximum of fifteen meals before supplementation or replacement with 'A-ration' or 'B-ration' field rations. They were soon called the "paratrooper ration", since paratroopers were the first to be issued the ration on an experimental basis.

The actual prototype of the K-ration was a pocket ration for paratroopers developed by the Subsistence Research Laboratory (SRL) at the request of the U.S. Army Air Forces (USAAF) early in the war. Two original samples (one version used pemmican biscuits, a peanut bar, raisins, and bouillon paste; the other used pemmican biscuits, a small D ration bar, canned processed meat, and lemon beverage powder) evolved into the one-package breakfast-dinner-supper combination later adopted as standard. The Quartermaster Command's Subsistence Branch altered some components and renamed the ration the Field Ration, Type K, or "K-ration"; the final version totaled 2,830 kilocalories (11,800 kJ). The first procurement of K-rations was made in May 1942. Some believed the K-ration was named after Dr. Keys or was short for "Commando" (as elite troops were the first to receive it). However, the letter "K" was selected because it was phonetically distinct from other letter-name rations.

The K-ration first saw use in 1942, when it was issued to U.S. Airborne troops on an experimental basis. Initial reports praised it for the variety of the foods incorporated, as well as the light weight. However, testing in extreme climatic and operating environments was extremely limited: in jungle testing, for example, the K-ration was evaluated in Panama by paratroopers and the Panama Jungle Test Platoon in an experiment lasting only three days. Marching was done not through jungle, as might be expected, but only on flat or gently rolling terrain on cleared roads, for an average of only 11 miles (18 km) per day. The test platoons carried one K-ration, weapon, poncho, shelter half, and a single filled one-quart canteen. No testing was done of men on extended patrols or with heavier individual loads of ammunition and water. At the end of the three days, the men were weighed, and as no abnormal weight loss was noted, the K-ration was deemed successful. These findings were later used in 1943 to support a decision to discontinue production of the Mountain ration and the Jungle ration. Both of these specialized rations had proved costlier to produce in their original form, and were intensely disliked by the Army's Subsistence Branch staff of the Quartermaster Corps, who had to secure additional supply contracts and storage facilities for the new rations. Though the K-ration was designed to be an emergency ration, Quartermaster Corps officials would continue to insist until the end of the war that the K-ration would satisfy all requirements for a lightweight complete field ration for all front-line troops at a scale of one K-ration per man per day, using the prior experiments with airborne forces as evidence. The ration's intended use as a short-term assault ration would soon fall by the wayside once U.S. forces entered combat.

One major criticism of the K-ration was its caloric and vitamin content, judged as inadequate based on evaluations made during and after World War II of the ration's actual use by Army forces. There was also a danger of over-reliance, which could cause the three meals to become monotonous if issued for long periods of time. The K-ration allowance was one ration per man per day (breakfast, dinner and supper), and because of the short duration and hasty nature of experimental testing of the K-ration before adoption, ration planners did not realize that soldiers fighting, digging, and marching in extreme conditions would require many more calories per day than a soldier marching over cleared roads in temperate climates. Nevertheless, one K-ration per man per day would remain the basis of issue, even for mountain troops fighting at high altitudes and infantrymen fighting in the thick jungles of Burma. Military personnel also supplemented with various other rations throughout the war such as with the C-ration when needed.

== Evaluation and field reports ==
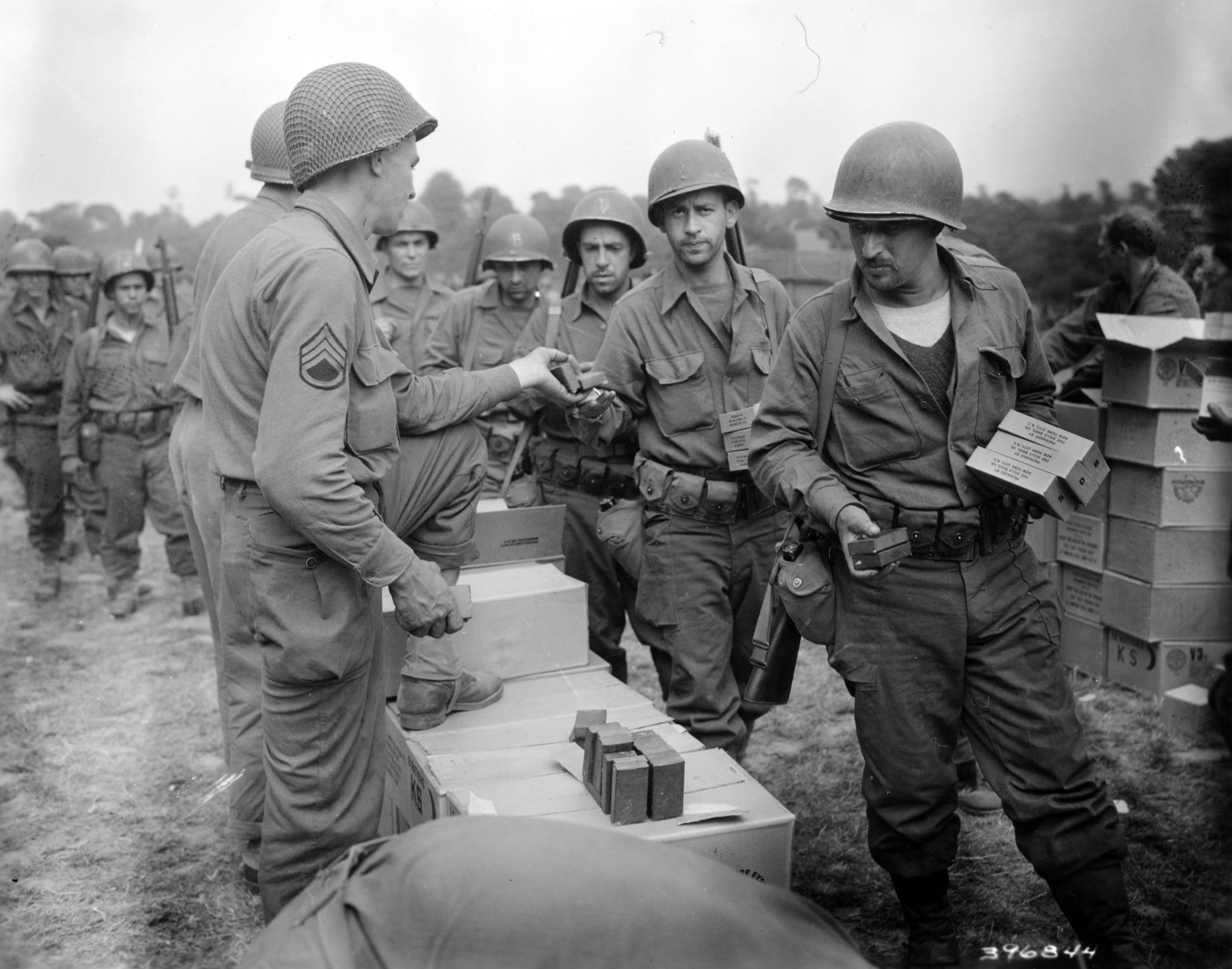
U.S. Army 90th Infantry Division soldiers picking up K-rations before being assigned to combat units, 1944

The C-ration was the only ration comparable to the K-ration in widespread issue, with six cans comprising one full ration. Introduced in 1938 it was significantly heavier, with less variety in meals, but had more protein.

While fighting in the European Theater of Operations, the US Army discovered that troops also quickly got tired of the K-ration, some being forced to eat it for days, or rarely, in excess of a week on end. As it was based on an emergency ration, a complete K-ration was 2,830 kcal (11,800 kJ) for the ration (breakfast, dinner and supper), fewer than required by highly active men, especially those working in extreme heat or bitter cold, and malnutrition became evident. The packaging of the K-ration into separately described daily meals may have intensified this problem by leading commanders to assume that daily caloric intake was sufficient. An extensive 1943 field report from the European theater noted that none of the packaged rations were recommended for continued use by active troops for periods in excess of 10 days. A survey of troops in the forward areas and evacuation hospitals of the Fifth U.S. Army serving in the Italian campaign noted that almost all soldiers questioned in infantry, engineer, and other mobile forward units said they had lost weight since the beginning of the Italian campaign. Surgeons commented upon a noticeable decrease in body fat and wasting of muscle, requiring copious feeding and rest, as well as ascorbic acid (Vitamin C).

The K-ration was also criticized for its performance in the China-Burma-India (CBI) theater of operations, where difficulties in supply from bases in India had resulted in widespread and monotonous use of the K-ration for light infantry forces of the United States, as well as Nationalist China and the United Kingdom. Many soldiers, including the U.S. unit known as Merrill's Marauders and British Chindit forces in Burma, had for five months lived primarily on K-rations, supplemented by rice, tea, sugar, jam, bread, and canned meat rations, which were dropped to them by air. In the case of the Marauders, whose diet consisted of 80% K-rations, severe weight loss (an average of 35 pounds or 16 kilograms per man) and vitamin deficiency were noted, which may have also contributed to a decline in resistance to various tropical diseases. A British medical officer reported that, of 209 Chindits examined at the end of this time, 182 had lost up to 30 pounds (14 kg) and 27 had lost from 30 to 70 pounds (14 to 32 kg). Deficiency diseases such as pellagra and beriberi were diagnosed. One of British General Orde Wingate's units in the Dehra Dun area was visited by quartermaster logistics officers some months after they had last eaten K-rations. At the sight of a box of K-rations carried by the visitors, two of Wingate's men vomited.

The unpalatable nature of some of the K-ration's components, such as the fatty pork loaf or the highly acidic lemon powder, caused many users to throw them away, further reducing actual consumed calorific content. Often, a secondary food source was issued, such as a D-ration bar, or fresh oranges, in an attempt to bring up the calorie and vitamin content.

In 1943, a ration board headed by the chief of the Nutrition Branch, Office of the Chief Surgeon, was appointed and directed to conduct comprehensive field tests on rations which would be used later in combat. In the first of these field tests it was noted that troops remained in reasonably good physical condition during a 10-day period on C, K, and five-in-one rations but that the rations were deficient in calories, especially for large men. The report listed the following recommendations: The use of the D ration as a supplement only; the further restriction of the use of C and K-rations to five-day periods unless supplemented; and the replacement of the wholly unsatisfactory dextrose and malted tablets of the K-ration with a more acceptable substitute. Additionally, replacement of the fruit powder component of C- and K-rations with a source of ascorbic acid that would guarantee the utilization of this nutrient was recommended, as the current diet of troops operating on individual rations in the field was almost wholly devoid of ascorbic acid.

By war's end, millions of K-rations had been produced, but the army had lost interest in them. Postwar Army supply plans for field rations relied solely on heavier canned wet rations, initially the C-ration, later by similar canned rations such as the Meal, Combat, Individual (MCI), primarily to save additional cost of procurement and storage. In 1948, after introduction of improvements in the C-ration, the K-ration was declared obsolete; production contracts had long since terminated. Most existing K-ration stocks were declared surplus, and distributed to civilian feeding programs overseas.

== Packaging ==
The K-ration originally came packed in an unbleached tan-colored rectangular cardstock box with black lettering. The outer box was printed on its top in bold capital sans serif block letter type with the text: "US ARMY FIELD RATION K", with the meal unit type (BREAKFAST, DINNER, or SUPPER UNIT) printed underneath it and a capital letter on each end (B, D, or S). While it was intended that the three meals be eaten in their named order, they were not always consumed in this manner. The inner box had the meal unit type printed across its top and a capital letter on each end (B, D, or S).

The later "Morale Series" had unique packaging designs that were color-coded and letter-coded on the ends for quick identification. The breakfast ration box had brown printing and was marked with a brown capital letter "B" on the ends, the dinner ration box had blue printing and was marked with a blue capital letter "D" on the ends, and the supper ration box had olive drab printing and was marked with an olive drab capital "S" on the ends. The packaging commencing with the earliest version of the ration consisted of a chemically treated cardboard outer carton and a waterproofed waxed-cardboard inner carton to protect the contents from contamination or damage. The waxed carton was found useful by soldiers to start small fires in which to boil water for coffee or cocoa.

The entrée came in a small, round metal can painted green with black lettering, with a metal key (dubbed a "twist key") to open it, packaged in a roughly square 3 in × 2 3/4 in × 1 7/16 in (76 mm × 70 mm × 37 mm) cardboard box.

The rest of the meal came packed neatly in a waxed paper or laminated cellophane pack. The pack always contained two packages of 8 rectangular K-1 or 4 square K-2 calorie-dense cracker biscuits each, a 4-pack of commercial-grade cigarettes, and either a flat rectangular stick of chewing gum or a square piece of candy-coated gum. Special items (like matches or Halazone tablets) were packed in one unit but not the others due to space limitations. Late production meals added a paper-wrapped paddle-like disposable wooden spoon and used the standard P-38 can opener instead of the "twist key".

== Menu ==
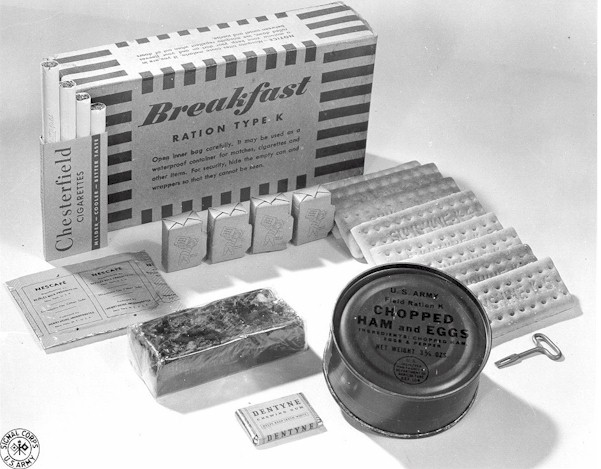
K-ration breakfast

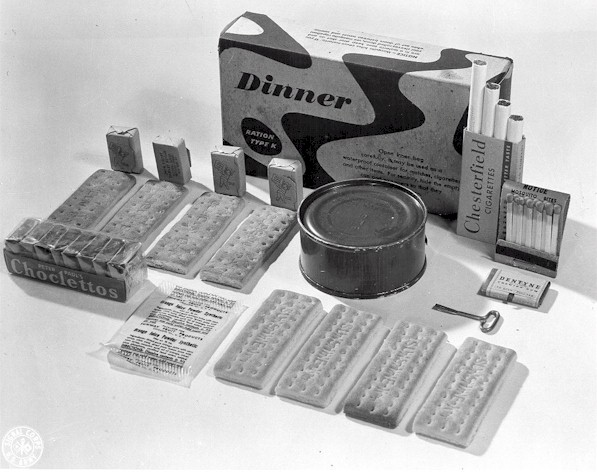
K-ration dinner

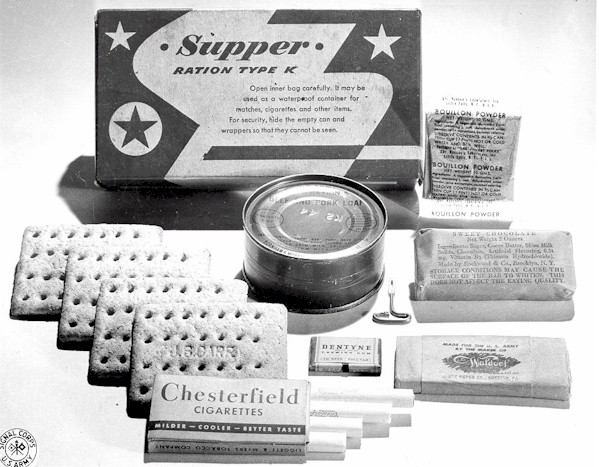
K-ration supper

- Breakfast Unit: canned veal (early version), canned chopped ham and eggs (all subsequent versions), biscuits, dextrose or malted milk tablets (early version), dried fruit bar, pre-mixed oatmeal cereal (late version), halazone water purification tablets, a four-pack of cigarettes, Dentyne or Wrigley chewing gum, instant coffee, a packet of toilet paper tissues, and sugar (granulated, cubed, or compressed).
- Dinner Unit: canned pork luncheon meat (early version), canned processed American cheese, Swiss and American cheese, or bacon and cheese (cheese entrée all subsequent versions), biscuits, 15 dextrose or malted milk (diastatic malt) tablets (early) or five caramels (late), sugar (granulated, cubed, or compressed), salt packet, a four-pack of cigarettes and a matchbook, chewing gum, and a powdered beverage packet (lemon (c. 1940), orange (c. 1943), or grape (c. 1945) flavor).
- Supper Unit: canned meat, consisting of cervelat sausage (early version), either pork luncheon meat with carrot or apple (first issue), beef and pork loaf (second issue); biscuits; a 2-ounce (57 g) D ration emergency chocolate bar (early version), Tropical bar, or (in temperate climates) commercial sweet chocolate bar (late version), a packet of toilet paper tissues; a four-pack of cigarettes, chewing gum, and a bouillon packet (cube or powder).

In total three meals provided 2,830 kilocalories (11,800 kilojoules) of food energy and 79 grams of protein, depending upon components. As it was originally intended as an "assault" ration to be issued for short durations, the K-ration was designed to be used for a maximum of 15 meals. The K-ration was mass-produced by several major U.S. food production companies, including the H. J. Heinz Company, Patten Food Products Company and The Cracker Jack Company.

K-ration crates were either wood (43 pounds or 20 kilograms each) or fiberboard (41 pounds or 19 kilograms each) and had a volume of 1.4 cubic feet (40 liters). Each crate contained 12 daily rations (each daily ration consisting of one Breakfast unit, one Dinner unit, and one Supper unit) for a total of 36 units per crate. They were packed one unit deep, three units wide (one of each unit), and twelve units long (all of the same unit type).

The U.S. Army M1943 uniform had simplified, but large, pockets that were designed to hold a K-ration box.

== See also ==
- 5-in-1 ration
- 10-in-1 food parcel
- C-ration
- Jungle ration
- Mountain ration
- United States military chocolate (D ration)
- Unitized Group Ration
