= Parachute Emergency Ration =

Specialized U.S. military ration

Parachute emergency rations were a type of United States military ration produced during World War II. The ration was meant as a survival ration for use of aircrew who bailed out of their aircraft. It initially comprised energy bars, fruit bars, K-biscuits, hard candy and lemon-juice powder but eventually evolved into a food pack which contained chocolate, hard candy, bouillon cubes, dehydrated cheese, crackers, sugar, instant coffee and gum, in addition to cigarettes and water-purification tablets. The ration was introduced in 1942 and remained in use until 1952. The ration was placed in the emergency kit fitted to the back or seat of a parachute harness.
