= Mountain ration =

Specialized U.S. military ration

The Mountain Ration (or "M-Ration") was a United States military ration developed for use by U.S. troops operating in high-altitude or mountainous regions of the European theatre of World War II.

== Origin, development, and use ==
The components of what would become the Mountain ration were developed in 1941–42 by U.S. Army officers in experimental mountain warfare companies, largely consisting of former ski instructors, forest rangers, and other experienced alpine travelers. Based on their recommendations, the Mountain ration was finalized and packaged for use by mountain and alpine troops by personnel at the Quartermaster Corps' Subsistence Research Laboratory in Chicago, Illinois.

In order to make the rations suitable for high-altitude climates, the Mountain ration was designed as a specialized compact ration that was easier to prepare in high-altitude environments, have adequate roughage, and enough bulk and quantity when heated to satisfy four men in one day at high altitude, weigh less than 40 ounces (1,100 g), and contain a total of 4,800 kilocalories (20,000 kilojoules) per man per day. The ration was formally adopted in November 1942.

The Mountain ration was produced from 1942 to 1943, and issued to soldiers of several elite U.S. and British Commonwealth forces then in training for alpine or winter combat, especially the 10th Mountain Division, and the First Special Service Force. As packaged, the Mountain ration was sized to serve four men for one day (three meals per man). It was normally prepared at the platoon or squad level, though 10th Division troopers were also taught to prepare it individually. The 1st Special Service Force first tried out the Mountain ration on November 28, 1942, during a training patrol to MacDonald Pass, Montana:

"At 1400 hours all company commanders and one other officer from each company and a few others left by truck for MacDonald Pass to try living under winter conditions and try a new mountain ration ... On arrival at the selected spot the party broke up into groups of four and built shelters and fires of many different types. The Mountain ration, which comes in four varieties, is packed in boxes, each box containing the rations of 4 men for 3 meals, this proved to be more than the average man could eat. They included powdered soup and milk, canned meat and butter, cereal, chocolate, biscuits, compressed fruits, sugar, tea and coffee and powdered lemon."

Because of its generous portions, specialization, and significantly higher cost, the Mountain ration was intensely disliked by the Quartermaster Command, headed by Quartermaster General Edmund B. Gregory, whose organization had to procure, store, and ship it. To bolster their argument, Quartermaster Corps and Subsistence Branch staff heavily criticized the Mountain ration for its weight, although for its caloric content a day's ration was lighter than alternative canned C rations, and it had nearly 2,000 kilocalories (8,400 kJ) more than the K ration.

The Mountain ration was also criticized for its involved preparation times; the Mountain ration required heating, which was difficult to accomplish for ordinary infantry soldiers without individual or squad-level cooking stoves, though this did not affect mountain troops such as the 10th Mountain Division, who had such equipment. In common with the alpine troops of other countries, the 10th's officers recognized the distinct benefits of heated, easily digested foods at high altitudes. However, the noise and bulk of heating equipment and additional cooking utensils was disliked by some 10th Mountain troopers, who viewed the mountain ration as better suited to bivouac areas or mountain strongholds not subject to sudden enemy assault. Significantly, diagnosed cases of malnourishment and vitamin deficiency, which had been reported among other light infantry units of the U.S. Army in the ETO who had been forced to consume the K ration for extended periods of time, did not arise among troops of the 10th Mountain Division, who received a wider variety of food rations including the Mountain ration, K ration, C ration, and 10-in-1 group ration while in the field.

By early 1943, less than three months after adoption, the Quartermaster Corps' Food Services Branch was already requesting the Army to abolish all non-standard lightweight individual rations except for the K and D rations. To the immense relief of the Quartermaster Corps's Food Services branch, the Mountain ration was discontinued and production terminated in 1943, though supplies continued to be issued well into 1944. The 10th Mountain Division, which was issued the ration while in training, did not deploy to combat until January 1945; in the last months of the war, with supplies of the Mountain ration exhausted, most of the 10th's troopers serving in combat were issued the K ration, the C ration, or the 10-in-1 ration.

At war's end, after the shortcomings of the C ration (monotony and weight) and the K ration (malnourishment and vitamin deficiency) had become apparent, the Quartermaster Corps attempted to shift responsibility for individual ration inadequacies. Contravening their earlier statements, the QC now asserted that overuse of the K and C rations (beyond two or three days) had caused the problem. Having successfully obtained the discontinuance of suitable alternative packaged rations, the QMC's Historical Summary report was conspicuously silent on how Army commanders could have observed this new ration restriction for troops in daily contact with a determined enemy. Surprisingly, even with this new admission, the QC still refused to abandon their prior recommendation for standardization on a single type of canned wet individual ration, a recommendation that was eventually adopted.

At war's end, rather than introduce a new and improved lightweight ration designed for prolonged use, the K ration was itself promptly discontinued (along with the 10-in-1 small group ration, which had proven somewhat useful in boosting nourishment levels for men living for extended periods on C or K rations). Instead, the C ration, still designated for "infrequent use", went through a series of largely unsuccessful minor revisions.

== Contents ==
The mountain ration contained:

- Biscuits
- Carter's spread (a butter substitute)
- Cereal (three different variations)
- Corned beef
- Dehydrated baked beans
- Dehydrated cheese
- Dehydrated potatoes
- Dehydrated soup
- D ration bars
- Fruit bars
- Granulated sugar
- Chewing gum
- Hard candy
- Lemon-juice powder
- Pork luncheon meat
- Pork sausage meat
- Powdered milk
- Precooked rice
- Salt
- Instant coffee
- Tea
- Toilet paper

In addition to the basic components listed, the 10th Mountain Division's officers and NCOs, many with a pre-war background in high altitude and alpine cooking, were known to significantly augment the Mountain ration with a stocked supply of numerous additional ingredients and spices.

== See also ==
- 5-in-1 ration
- 10-in-1 ration
- B-Ration
- C ration
- K ration
- Jungle ration
- United States military ration
