= P-38 can opener =

U.S. military can opener

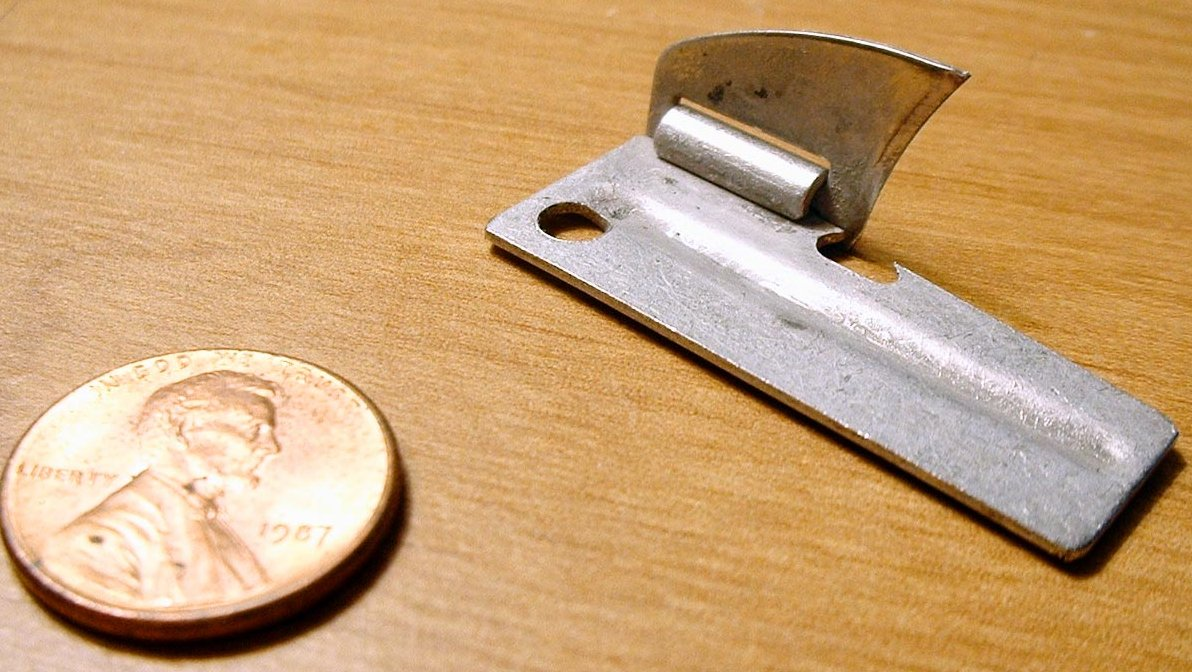
The P-38 can opener is 1.5 inches (38 mm) long. A U.S. penny is shown for scale

The P-38 is a foldable carbon steel can opener that was issued with canned United States military rations from its introduction in 1942 to the end of canned ration issuance in the 1980s. Originally distributed in the K-ration, it was later included in the C-ration. A larger later variant is known as the P-51.

== Design ==
The can opener is approximately 1.5 inches (38 mm) long, and consists of a short rectangular metal handle with a small, hinged metal tooth that folds out to pierce the can lid.

A notch just below the hinge keeps the opener hooked beneath the rim of the can as the device is "walked" around to cut the lid out. A larger version called the P-51 is somewhat easier to operate thanks to the greater leverage it can generate.

The designer of the original device that acquired the official U.S. military designations "U.S. ARMY POCKET CAN OPENER" and "OPENER, CAN, HAND, FOLDING, TYPE I", commonly known as the P-38 is unknown. In spite of widespread claims that the P-38 was designed in a 30-day whirl of inspired effort by the U.S. Army Subsistence Lab in Chicago in 1941, a fully fledged version of the device (differing only in the hole for attaching to a lanyard being on the opposite end of its body) appeared in a 1924 edition of Popular Mechanics. It is described as being "designed for campers and Boy Scouts", and is illustrated in use. Readers were offered more information on the item by writing to Popular Mechanics, Chicago.

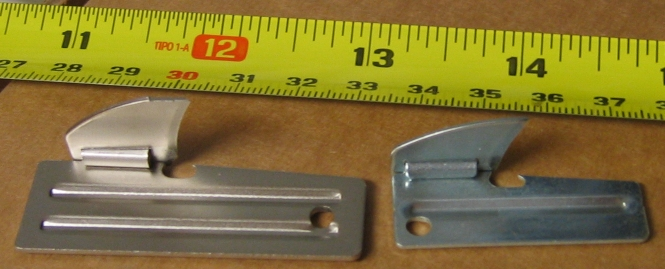
Size comparison of P-51 and P-38 openers

The P-38 was preceded in US military field rations such as the K-ration and C-ration by then traditional twist-key can opening, where a provided key was inserted in a tab and twisted around a can to peel away a metal sealing strip.

P-38s are no longer used for individual rations by the U.S. military, as canned C-rations were replaced by MRE rations in the 1980s, packed in plastic pouches. The P-51, larger at 2 inches (51 mm), is included with United States military "Tray Rations" (canned bulk meals). P-38s are also still seen in disaster recovery efforts and have been handed out alongside canned food by rescue organizations in several countries.

J. W. Speaker Corporation of Germantown, Wisconsin, was one of the early contractors for the military P-38, producing them in the millions (stamped "Speaker USA" or "U S speaker"). The opener was also manufactured by Washburn Corporation (marked "US Androck"); and later by Mallin Shelby Hardware inc (closed 1973) of Shelby, Ohio, variously stamped "US Mallin Shelby O." or "U.S. Shelby Co."

== Operation ==
The P-38 is operated by pivoting its cutting tooth to its designed 95-degree position from its stowed position folded against the body. The opener is held in the right hand by the flat long section, with its circular notch hooking the underside of the can's rim and the cutting tooth pointing downward and away from the user.

The right hand is rotated slightly away from the user, causing the can lid to be punctured. The opener is then advanced slightly towards the user and the motion repeated around the can.

As the folding tooth only locks in one orientation, operation is reversed for left-handed usage, an ergonomically much less efficient procedure.

The flat end of the P-38 can be used as a makeshift screw driver.

== Similar devices ==
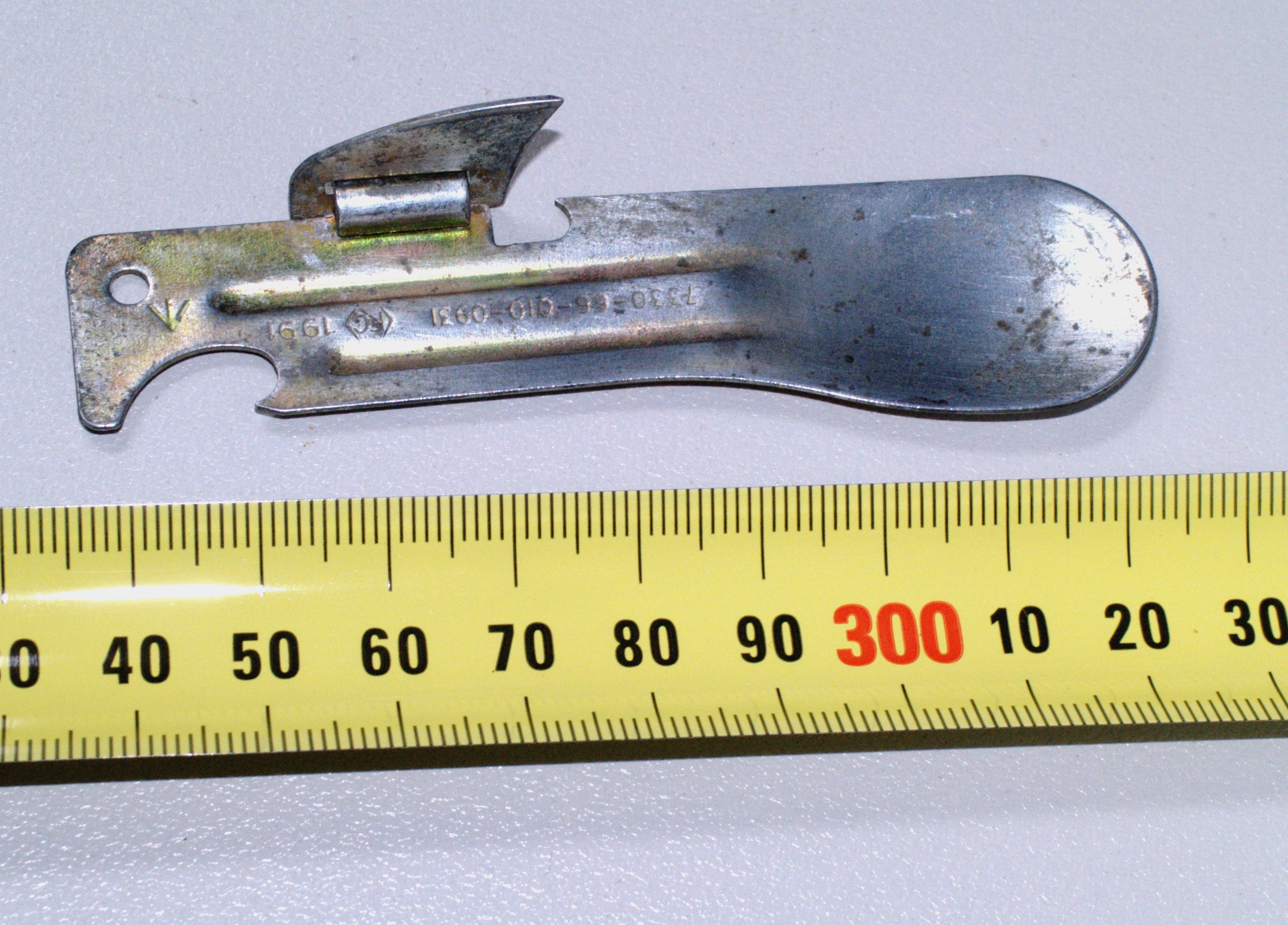
A standard issue "FRED" can opener of the Australian Defence Force.

A similar device that incorporates a small spoon at one end and a bottle opener at the other was issued by the Australian Defence Force and New Zealand Army in their ration kits from 1943 to 2005. The Field Ration Eating Device was known by the acronym "FRED", also known widely in its derogatory backronym, the "Fucking Ridiculous Eating Device".

Another similar device was included with British Army "Operational Ration Pack, General Purpose" 24-hour ration pack and "Compo" Composite (14 man) Ration pack rations. At one stage they were manufactured by W.P. Warren Engineering Co. Ltd, Birmingham, England. The instructions printed on the miniature greaseproof paper bag they were supplied in read:

TO OPEN CAN:
Place opener on the can with rim of can inside the slot. Hold between thumb and forefinger and twist forward to puncture. Repeat motion until can is open.

The Swedish army also distributed a similar variant of this opener, officially designated M7481-021000 Konservbrytare Mini, with field rations.

== See also ==
- Church key
