= A-ration =

U.S. military ration of fresh, refrigerated, or frozen food

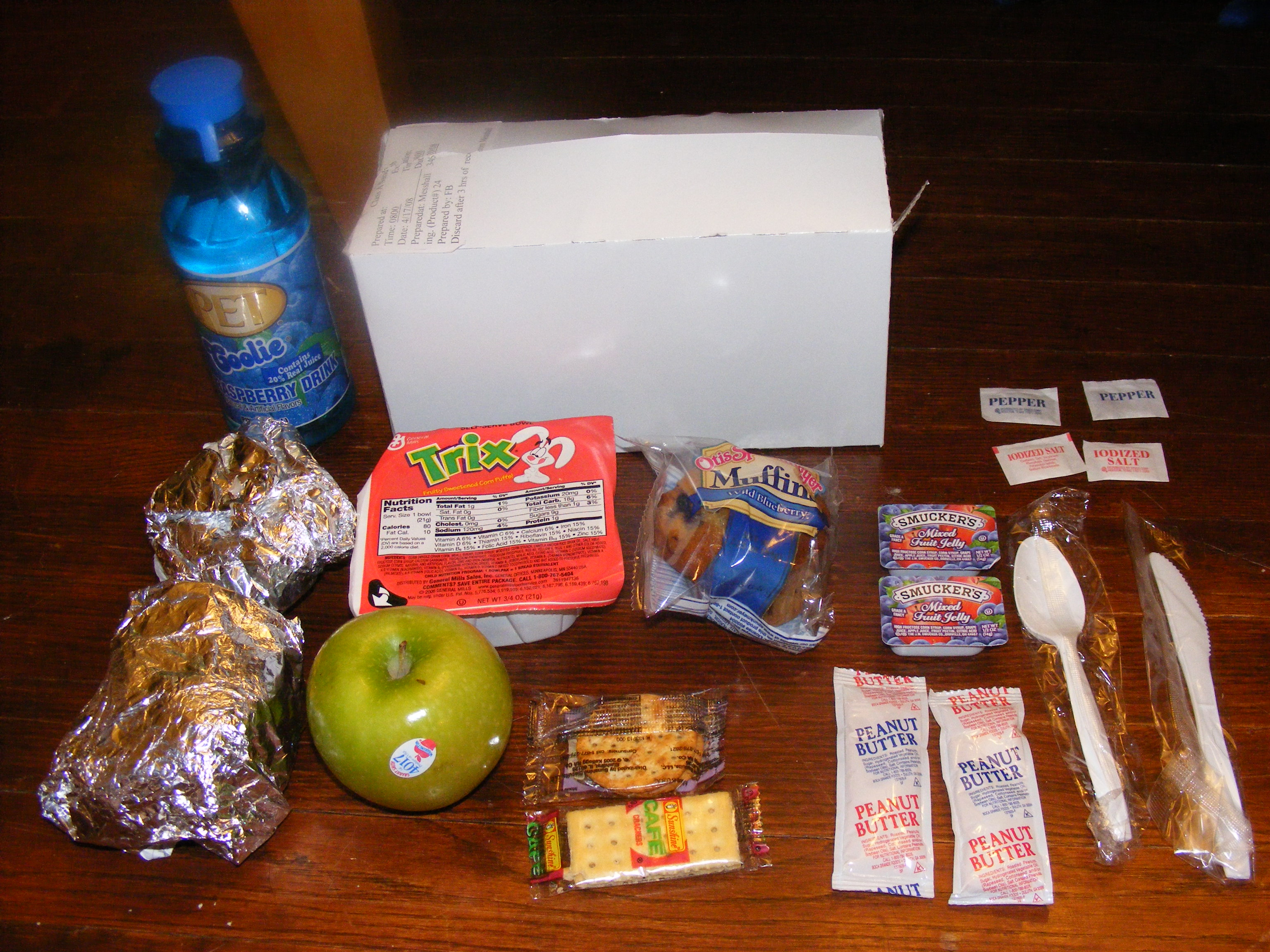
United States Marine Corps-issued A-ration, colloquially known as a "bag nasty" or "box nasty". In this case the box held two sandwiches, cereal, fresh fruit, crackers, peanut butter, jam, a muffin, salt, pepper, and a drink.

The A-ration (officially Field Ration, Type A) is a United States military ration consisting of fresh, refrigerated, or frozen foods. A-rations may be served in dining facilities, prepared in the field using field kitchens, or prepared at a fixed facility and transported to field locations in containers. Its modern successor is the Unitized Group Ration – A (UGR-A), which combines multiple types of rations, including the A-ration, under one unified system.

The A-ration differs from other U.S. alphabetized rations such as the B-ration, consisting of canned or preserved food; C-ration, consisting of prepared wet food when A- and B-rations are not available; D-ration, consisting of military chocolate; K-ration, consisting of three balanced meals; and emergency rations, intended for emergencies when other food or rations are unavailable.

== Unitized Group Ration A ==
A-rations today may include the Unitized Group Ration – A, a hybrid meal kit designed to feed a group of 50 people for one meal. The UGR-A has several different varieties, including a tray-based heat and serve (T-rat) form, heated by hot water immersion when a field kitchen is not available, or the express form, with a self-heating module and disposable accessories. The UGR-A is used to sustain military personnel during worldwide operations that allow organized food service facilities.

The UGR-A includes perishable/frozen type entrees (A-rations) along with commercial-type components and perishable/frozen type entrees to provide the luxury of an A-ration meal in the field, configured into individual meal modules for ease of ordering, distribution, and preparation. The UGR-A has at least 9 months shelf life (at 80 °F or 27 °C for semi-perishable modules and at 0 °F or −18 °C for perishable modules).
