= United States military ration =

U.S. military food and field meals

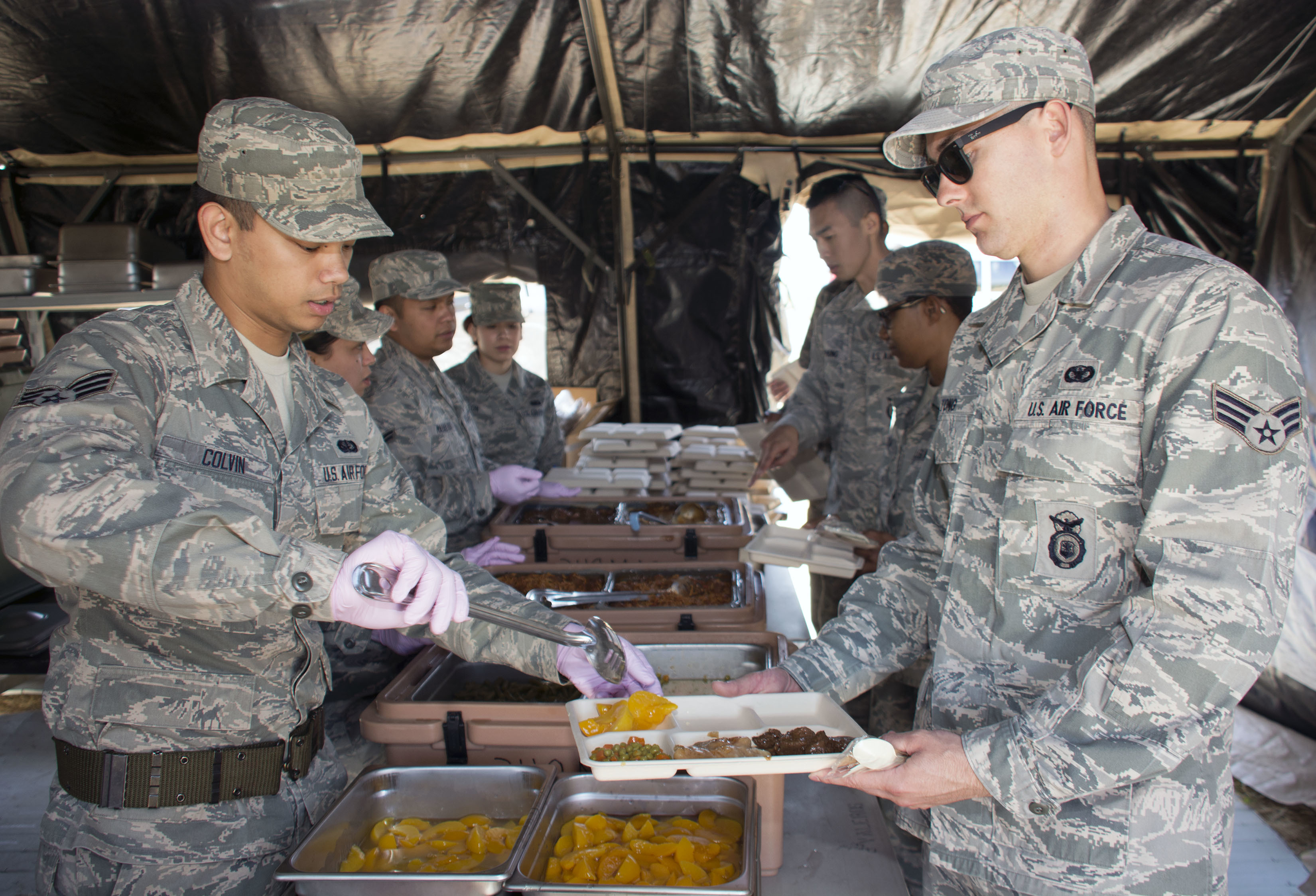
U.S. Air Force airmen serving Unitized Group Rations prepared in a single palletized expeditionary kitchen

United States military ration refers to the military rations provided to sustain United States Armed Forces service members, including field rations and garrison rations, and the military nutrition research conducted in relation to military food. U.S. military rations are often made for quick distribution, preparation, and eating in the field and tend to have long storage times in adverse conditions due to being thickly packaged or shelf-stable.

== History ==
=== 18th and 19th centuries ===
From the Revolutionary War to the Spanish–American War, the U.S. Army ration, as decreed by the Continental Congress, was the garrison ration, which consisted of meat or salt fish, bread or hardtack, and vegetables.

There was also a spirit ration. In 1785, it was set at four ounces of rum, reduced to two ounces of whiskey, brandy, or rum in 1790. In 1794, troops about to enter combat or who were engaged in frontier service could receive a double ration of four ounces of rum or whiskey; this was extended in 1799 to include troops engaged in fatigue duties. It was discontinued in 1832 and replaced with a ration of coffee and sugar, which was increased in 1836. In 1846, a spirit ration was reinstated for issue to troops engaged in construction or surveying duties; this was discontinued in 1865.

During the American Civil War, both armies struggled to keep their soldiers adequately fed. Difficulties with food logistics led to a multitude of rations.

=== World War I ===
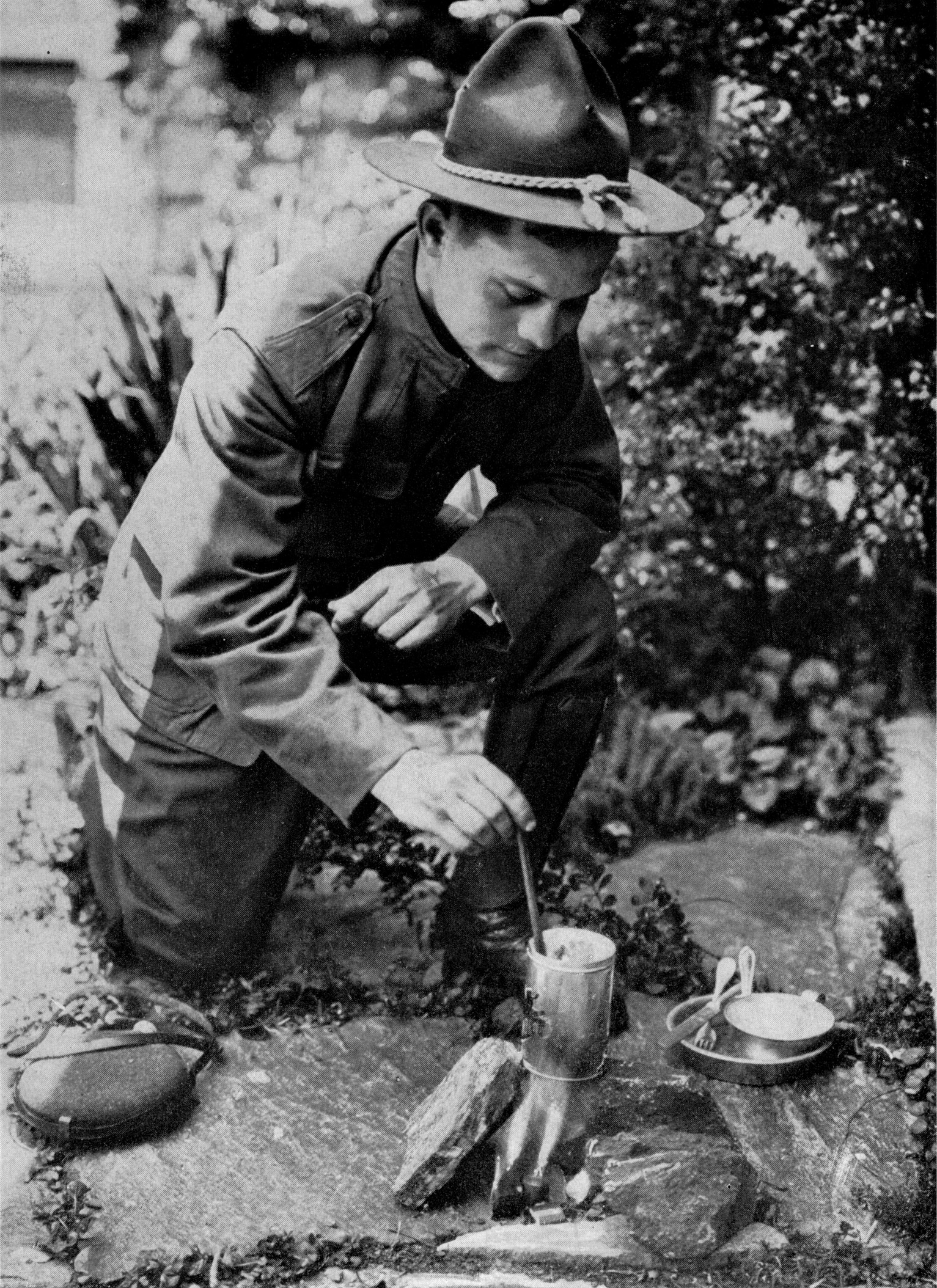
An American soldier boiling his rations using rolls of paraffin-saturated paper to create a cooking fire without smoke, 1917

In World War I three types of rations came into usage by the U.S. military: the Reserve ration, the Trench ration, and the Emergency ration (also known as the Iron ration).

==== "Iron Ration" (1907–1922) ====
The first attempt to make an individual ration for issue to soldiers in the field was the "iron ration", first introduced in 1907. It consisted of three three-ounce cakes (made from a concoction of beef bouillon powder and parched and cooked wheat), three one-ounce bars of sweetened chocolate, and packets of salt and pepper that were issued in a sealed tin packet that weighed one pound. It was designed for emergency use when the troops were unable to be supplied with food. It was later discontinued by the adoption of the "Reserve Ration", but experience with the Iron Ration went into the development of the emergency D-ration.

==== "Trench Ration" (1914–1918) ====
This ration was issued in the early part of the war to address a problem. Soldiers fighting in the front lines needed to be supplied with their daily rations, but cooked food prepared at field kitchens was sometimes spoiled by gas attacks. The trench ration was the answer. It was a variety of canned meats (salmon, corned beef, sardines, etc.) that were commercially procured and sealed in a large tin box covered in canvas. It was bulky and heavy and the soldiers began to get weary of the limited menu and it was soon replaced by the Reserve Ration.

==== "Reserve Ration" (1917–1937) ====
The reserve ration was first issued during the latter part of World War I to feed troops who were away from a garrison or field kitchen. It originally consisted of 12 ounces of fresh bacon or one pound of canned meat known as the Meat Ration, usually corned beef. Additionally, two 8-ounce cans of hard bread or hardtack biscuits, a packet of 1.16 ounces of pre-ground coffee, a packet of 2.4 ounces of granulated sugar, and a packet of 0.16 ounces of salt were issued. There was also a separate "tobacco ration" of 0.4 ounces of tobacco and 10 cigarette rolling papers, later replaced by brand-name machine-rolled cigarettes.

After the war, there were attempts to improve the ration based on input from the field. In 1922, the Meat Ration was revised, consisting of one pound of meat (usually a combination of dried beef and canned corned beef). This was supplemented by hard chocolate, 14 ounces of hard bread or hardtack biscuits, coffee, and sugar. In 1925, the Meat Ration was changed, removing the dried beef in favor of canned pork and beans, and reducing the bread component. The corned beef allowance was also reduced in size (older rations continued to be issued, however). In 1936, menu planners attempted to introduce more variety by developing an alternate Meat Ration consisting of an "A"-menu (canned corned beef) and a "B"-menu (canned pork and beans). The A and B Reserve or combat ration was canceled after being superseded in 1938 by the Field Ration, Type C.

=== World War II ===
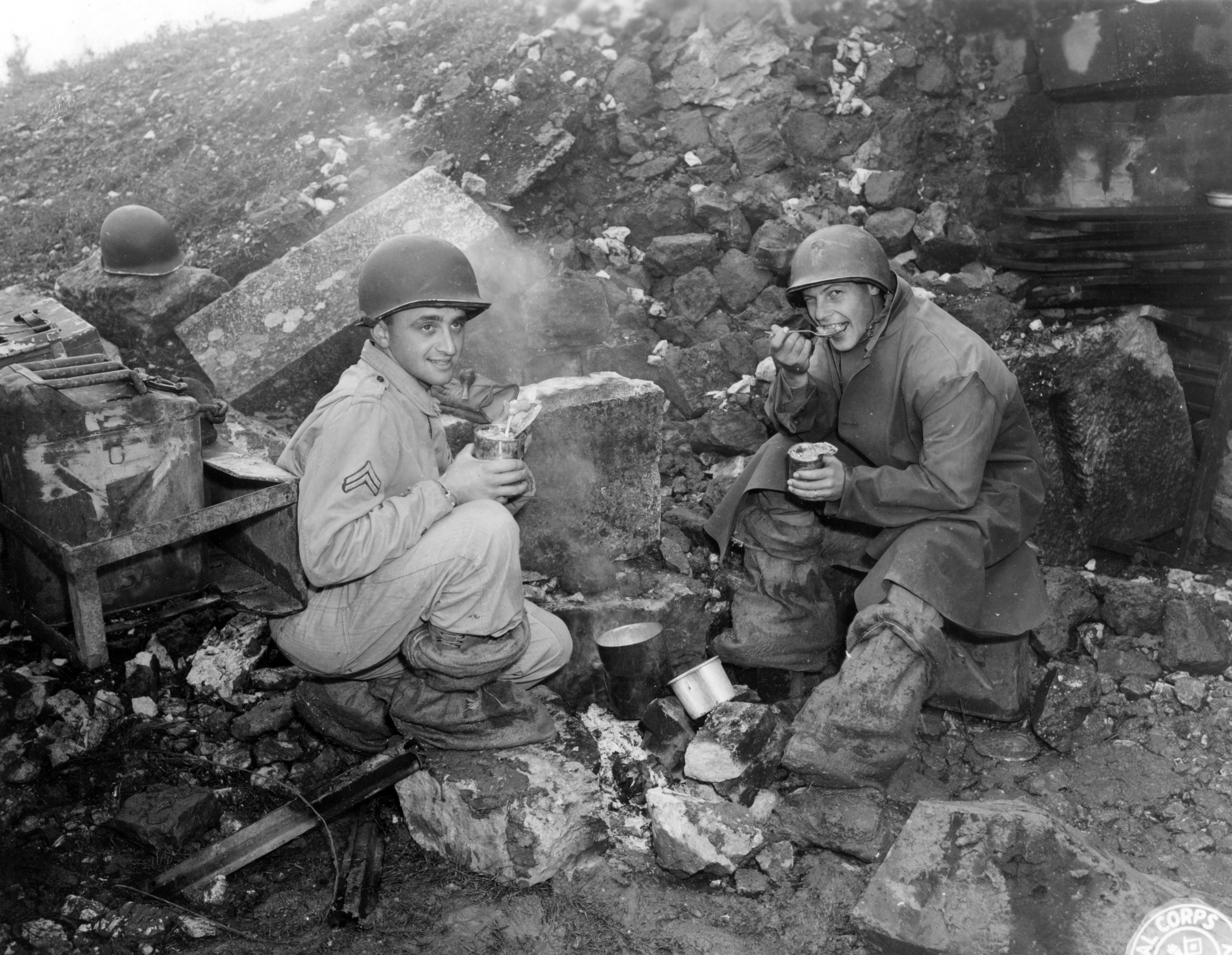
U.S. Army soldiers eating C-rations during the Italian campaign of World War II, 1943

After 1918, the army ration system went through several revisions, eventually leading to the:

- A-ration: Garrison ration. Fresh, refrigerated, or frozen food prepared in dining halls or field kitchens. The most valued of all rations.
- B-ration: Field ration. Canned, packaged, or preserved foods normally prepared in field kitchens without refrigeration.
- C-ration: Individual ration. A complete pre-cooked, ready-to-eat canned individual meal.
- K-ration: Individual ration. Designed as a short duration individual "assault" ration for paratroopers and other specialized light infantry forces. Declared obsolete in 1948.
- D-ration: Emergency ration. Bars of concentrated chocolate combined with other ingredients to provide high calorie content (intended as an emergency ration).

A-rations were generally whatever meat and produce could be obtained locally, so there could be great variety from one theatre of operations to the next. B-rations were generally used when there was inadequate refrigeration for perishable A-rations. The composition of the D-ration did not change much throughout the war, but the C-ration developed many variations.

A- and B-rations were only served at bases or established camps in rear areas as they require cooking. C-rations could be eaten hot or cold and required no special preparation or storage, so these could be served almost anywhere.

During the war a new ration for assault troops, the 2,830 calories (11,800 kJ) K-ration, was developed. K-rations were originally intended to be used as short duration rations for only 2–3 days, but cost concerns and later standardization led to its overuse, contributing in some cases to vitamin deficiencies and malnourishment.

There were various other special rations developed for specific circumstances, including:

- Type X Ration
- 5-in-1 ration
- 10-in-1 food parcel
- Mountain ration: 4,800 calories (20,000 kJ), discontinued 1943
- Jungle ration: 4,000 calories (17,000 kJ), discontinued 1943
- The Assault Lunch: Chocolate bars, caramels, dried fruit, chewing gum, peanuts, salt tablets, cigarettes, matches, and water purification tablets; total of 1,500–2,000 calories (6,300–8,400 kJ), discontinued 1947
- The Assault ration (Pacific Theater): 28 pieces of assorted hard candy, chewing gum, cigarettes and a chocolate peanut bar
- The Aircrew Lunch
- The AAF Combat Lunch
- Parachute Emergency Ration
- Liferaft Ration
- Airborne Lifeboat Ration

=== Cold War rations ===
Some of these specialized rations were discontinued during the war due to cost concerns, forcing commanders to adopt standardized rations in their place. The K- and D-rations were declared obsolete after World War II, but canned wet rations in the form of the C-ration (later the MCI) continued until 1983, when they were replaced by the Meal, Ready-to-Eat (MRE). Created during this era was the T-ration (or "T-rat"), a semi-perishable meal packaged, heated, and served in a tray pack similar to frozen meals.

== Present-day issuance ==
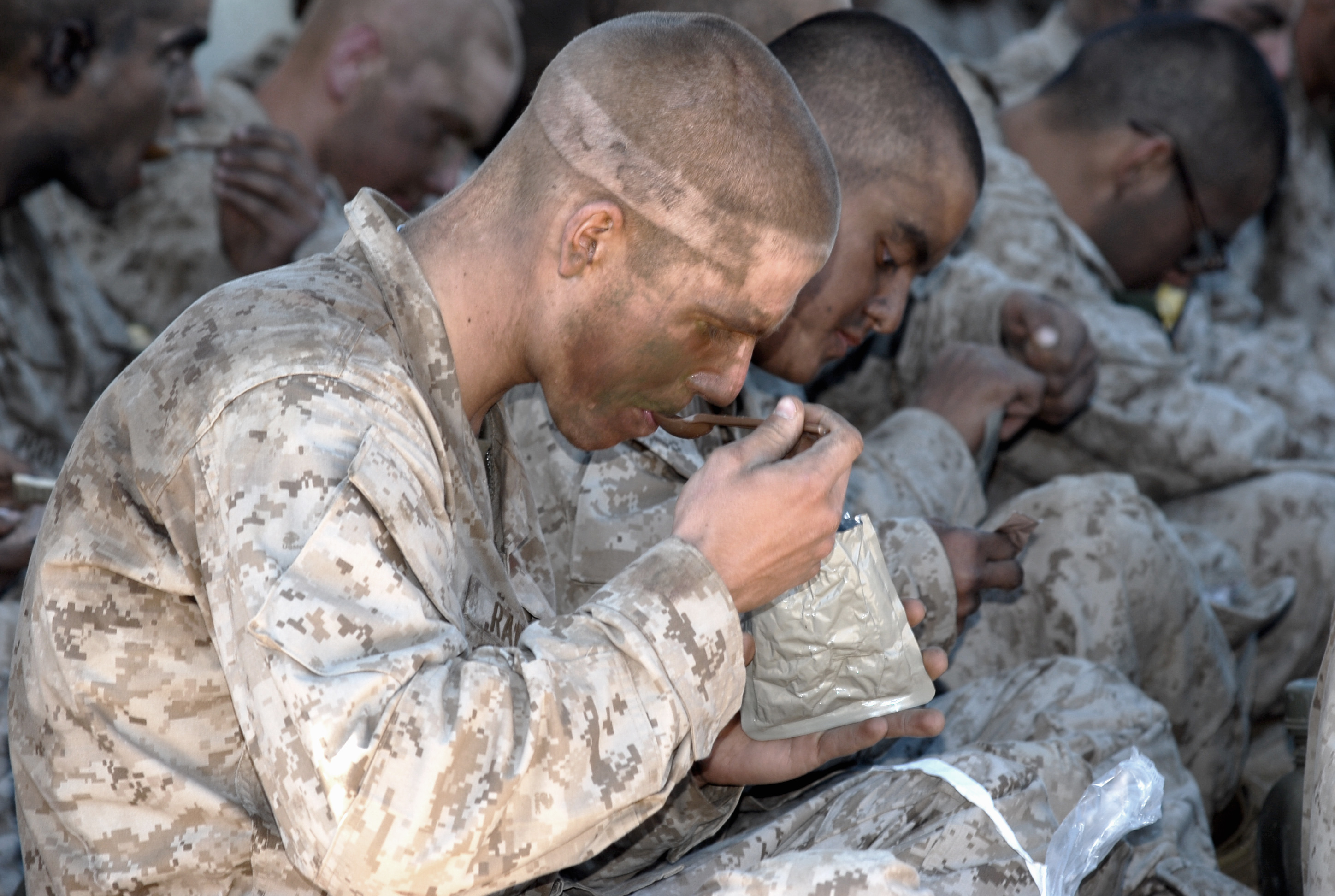
A U.S. Marine eating an MRE, 2005. This Marine is taking part in "The Crucible" training course, part of which has trainees ration their MREs over a three-day period.

Currently, the following rations are available to troops:

- Unitized Group Ration: standard group ration for feeding personnel in field kitchens and garrisons, succeeding the A-, B-, and T-rations
  - UGR-H&S (Heat & Serve): precooked, shelf-stable meals designed to be heated and served in less than an hour
  - UGR-A: fresh meals prepared on-site (or nearby and transported), requiring refrigeration and a field kitchen
  - UGR-M (formerly UGR-B): group ration consisting primarily of dehydrated and shelf-stable foods, intended for use by the U.S. Marine Corps
  - UGR-E (Express): group ration in self-heating packages designed for situations where field kitchens are unavailable
- Navy Standard Core Menu: 14- to 28-day rotational menu used as the group ration for personnel aboard U.S. Navy vessels and administered separately from the UGR system
- Meal, Ready-to-Eat: standard individual field ration
- Close Combat Assault Ration: compact, lightweight individual field ration designed to be consumed on the move

The composition of these rations are predetermined in a way to make sure that soldiers are properly fed and equipped with the necessary nutrients in order to maximize energy levels. There are certain levels of nutrients that are recommended by the Military Nutrition Research Committee. As a baseline, it is recommended that there be at least 2,400 kcal in each ration, in which those rations are constructed of different levels of numerous vitamins and nutrients.

== Ration waste disposal ==
The military prioritizes the burn disposal of the waste because, if not taken care of properly, it can lead to more problems. The goal achieved from the proper disposal includes the elimination of vermin problems, airborne diseases, and preventing any enemy militaries from obtaining the waste to use as resources for themselves or as intelligence.

== See also ==
- Armed Forces Recipe Service
- History of military nutrition in the United States
