= B-ration =

U.S. military ration of packaged and preserved unprepared food

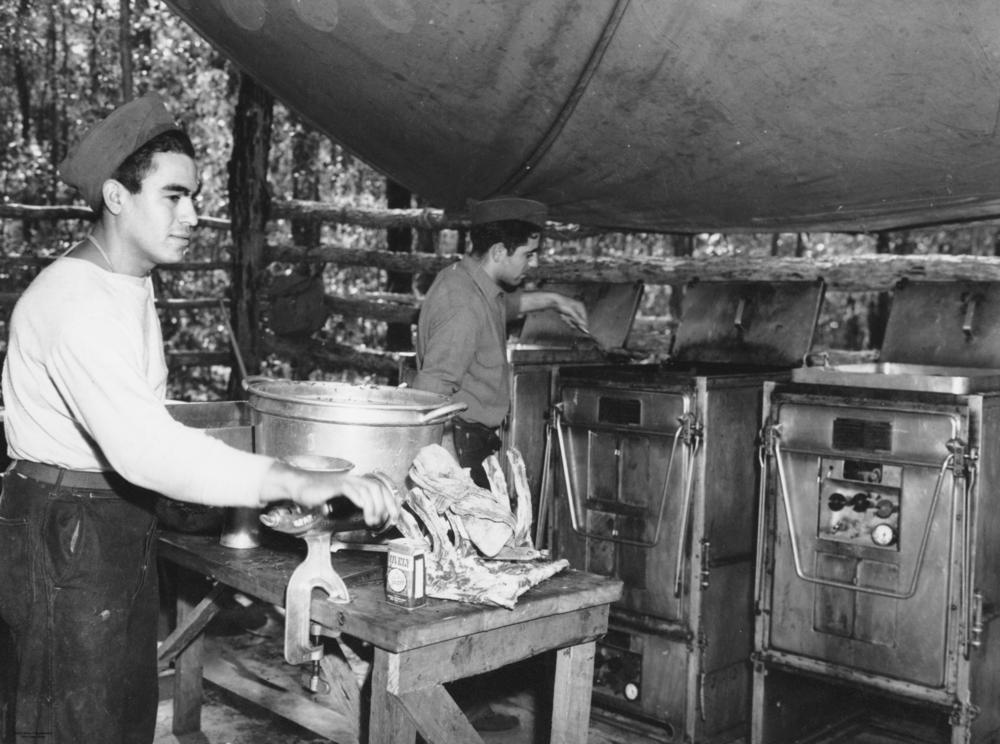
United States Army field cooks preparing B-rations at a field kitchen in Australia, 1942

The B-ration (officially Field Ration, Type B) was a United States military ration consisting of packaged and preserved food intended to be prepared in field kitchens by cooks. Its modern successor is the Unitized Group Ration – M (UGR-M), which combines multiple types of rations, including the B-ration, under one unified system.

The B-ration differs from other American alphabetized rations such as the A-ration, consisting of fresh food; C-ration, consisting of prepared wet food when A- and B-rations were not available; D-ration, consisting of military chocolate; K-ration, consisting of three balanced meals; and emergency rations, intended for emergencies when other food or rations are unavailable.

== Overview ==
Field rations such as the A-ration, B-ration, and emergency rations consisted of food items issued to troops operating in the field. Like the A-ration, the B-ration required the use of trained cooks and a field kitchen for preparation; however, it consisted entirely of semi-perishable foods and so did not require refrigeration equipment.

As of 1982, the B-ration consisted of approximately 100 items which were issued in bulk and packaged in cans, cartons, pouches, and other packing material. An individual ration had a gross weight of 3.639 pounds, measured 0.1173 cubic feet, and could supply approximately 4,000 calories. B-rations were organized into a ten-day menu cycle which ensured a variety of different meals each day and could be altered as the service needed.

The advantage of the B-ration was that it provided balanced nutrition in all climates and individual components could be easily substituted with fresh foods when they became available, a practice highly encouraged to avoid food monotony. However the meals could not be made without trained cooks and required significant investment. Preparing a meal for 100 personnel using B-rations required two to three hours for two cooks to prepare (plus additional personnel to help with serving and clean-up) and on average 75 gallons of potable water.

== Unitized Group Ration M ==
The modern equivalent to the B-ration is the Unitized Ground Ration – M, formerly called the Unitized Ground Ration – B. It is distinct from other forms of UGR, such as the UGR-H&S, in that it consists of dehydrated ingredients with an intended recipe in mind, as opposed to precooked or preassembled meals. Unlike the B-ration, the UGR-M is only issued to the United States Marine Corps.
