= Military rations =

Goods, usually food, given to military personnel

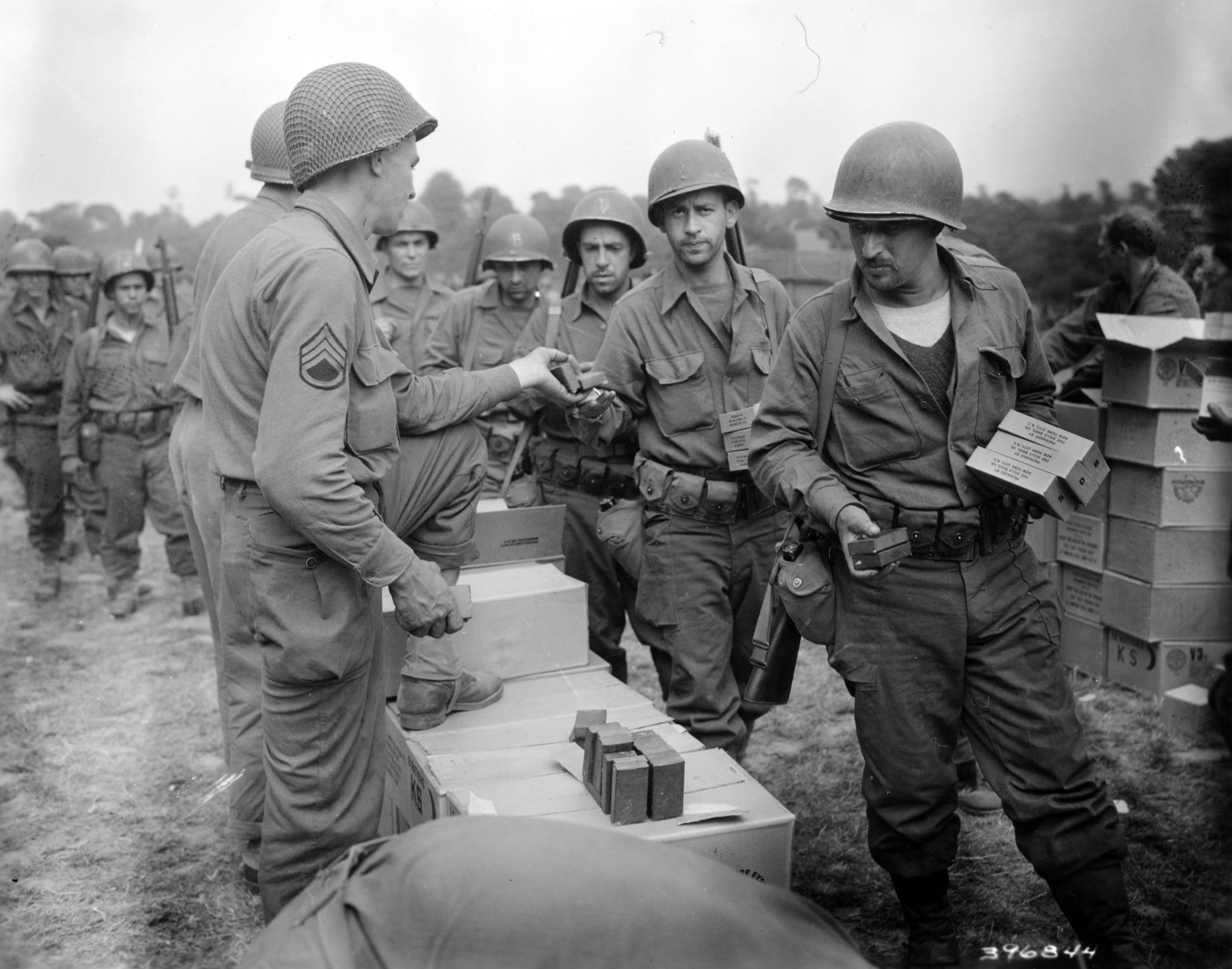
United States Army soldiers receiving their issued rations in France during World War II, 1944

Military rations, operational rations, or military provisions are goods issued to sustain the needs of military personnel. As their name suggests, military rations have historically been, and often still are, subject to rationing, with each individual receiving specific amounts from available supplies. Military-issued goods and the rationing of such goods have existed since the beginnings of organized warfare.

Though commonly referring to food and drink rations, "military ration" may also refer to other types of items that are rationed for military personnel, such as fuel, alcohol, expensive items, or consumer goods. Ration acquisition may be managed using allowances or a ration card, or they may be issued without charge.

Military rations are a key component of military nutrition, the field and study of nutrition in the military. Significant research goes into creating military rations, including the nutrition and energy of rations, food spoilage prevention, what meals should be offered, the amount of food each ration should contain, and the exact specifications of each meal and ingredient.

== Types ==
=== Field ration ===
A field ration (known under a variety of other names) is a military ration intended to provide nutrition and sustenance in the field, in combat, at the front line, or where eating facilities are otherwise unavailable.

Field rations can be categorized into two main types:

- Individual rations, designed and intended to sustain a single person
- Group rations, designed and intended to sustain multiple personnel

=== Garrison ration ===
A garrison ration is a type of military ration that, depending on its use and context, could refer to rations issued to personnel at a camp, installation, or other garrison; allowance allotted to personnel to purchase goods or rations sold in a garrison (or the rations purchased with allowance); a type of ration; or a combined system with distinctions and differences depending on situational factors (such as whether the country is at peace or at war).

== History ==
=== Ancient and antiquity ===
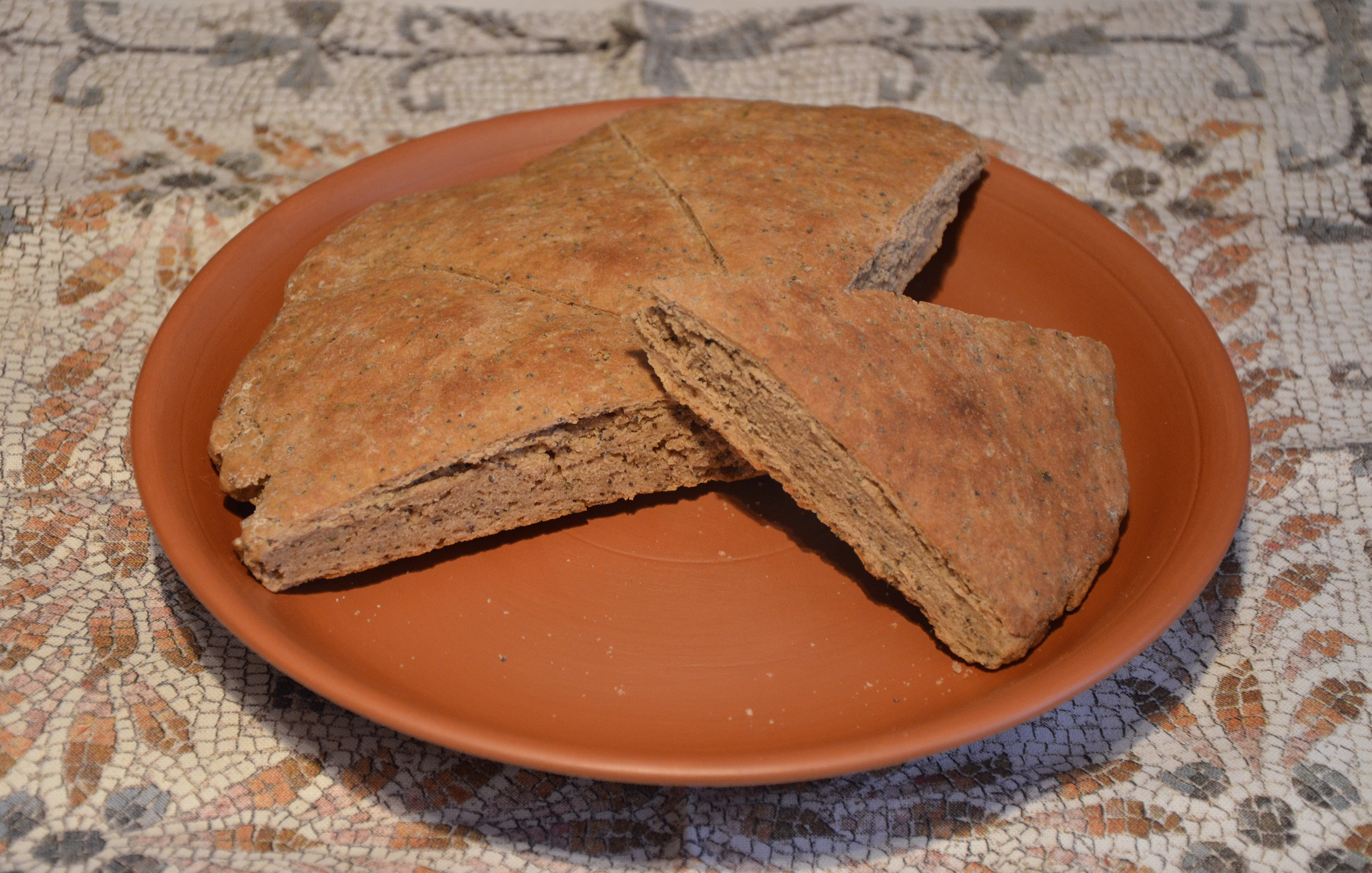
A modern recreation of flatbread eaten by ancient Roman soldiers

In ancient warfare, militaries generally lived off the land, relying on whatever food they could forage, steal, purchase, or requisition. Armies that brought food supplies along with them would have to resort to carrying them in baggage trains and having soldiers carry their rations themselves.

In Mesopotamia, most workers, including soldiers, were given rations of barley, oil, and wool. The first standing army in recorded history formed in ancient Mesopotamia under the reign of Sargon of Akkad, and as the army grew with his conquests, a military bureaucracy formed. According to letters from the time of Sargon II, the primary ration for his army was grain. The letters describe what types of grain are to be held for a campaign, in which locations, which grain to give to the soldiers and which to store as fodder for the pack animals, and provide lists of how much grain to give to the soldiers of specific ranks.

In ancient Egypt, soldiers brought whatever they could carry in battle, but were provided with good food and wine while in their camps. Archaeologists have discovered small wooden tokens dating from the Middle Kingdom period carried by soldiers which were to be handed over in exchange for rations in Lower Nubia. The tokens carry inscriptions declaring the amount of bread a soldier is to be issued every ten days. Writing in Histories, Herodotus described warriors serving as the Pharaoh's bodyguards receiving a daily provision of five minae of roast grain, two minae of beef, and four cups of wine. One mina is equivalent to approximately 1.25 pounds (570 g).

In ancient Rome, as with civilians, soldiers subsisted primarily off of wheat, which would be either made into bread or a pottage called puls. Less commonly issued grains were oats, which were seen as fodder and only eaten in times of desperation, millet, which was only grown in small amounts, rye, which was only grown in areas too cold for wheat, and barley, which was issued to soldiers as punishment for minor offenses. In the second century BC, a soldier's wheat ration was 66 pounds (30 kg) per month. Soldiers were also given smoked bacon, fresh meat such as pork or mutton when available, vegetables, legumes, cheese, vinegar, olive oil, and wine. Each soldier had an allotted amount of food they could have, such as one pound (450 g) of meat daily; the size of a Roman legion meant dozens, if not hundreds of animals could be killed daily to sustain their needs. The cost of the ration would be deducted from the soldier's pay. Supplies were sent in two ways. The impedimenta supplies were carried on a baggage train of carts carried by pack animals accompanying the army while commeatus supplies were sent to an army from Rome or another major city in the empire by road or ship. Soldiers also carried some of their provisions and their mess kits in their sarcina. They were issued rations several times a week. Archaeologists have found evidence of soldiers having access to foodstuffs such as coriander, oysters, and spices including pepper imported from India, suggesting that soldiers, especially officers, could buy finer ingredients. Archaeological excavations in Germany and Britain show that in addition to the meat supplied by the army, soldiers hunted animals such as beavers, badgers, foxes, and wolves while on campaign. Most grain rations were issued whole, meaning that soldiers had to mill and process the grain by themselves. However, grain rations also included hardtack biscuits called buccellatum, which were baked twice to remove the moisture, making them harder to spoil. These biscuits may have been ground into flour. Roman soldiers ate twice a day. The first meal, the prandium, likely required no cooking. The main meal was the cena, during which soldiers cooked and ate communally with their contubernium. Supply of water faced logistical problems. Roman military camps were typically built near water sources and soldiers were expected to collect their water for the days' march in a waterskin that was stored in the sarcina. As fresh water was not always available, water was often transported in barrels. However, this could result in the water becoming tainted, and so it was mixed with wine and vinegar to create posca, a drink which became popular among the urban poor as well as the army. During the Byzantine era, soldiers were trained in sustaining their food supplies for as long as 20 days, with many also carrying small hand mills to grind grain to make paximathia.

In ancient Greece, hoplites were expected to bring foodstuffs and wine with them when going on campaigns. However, as the amount they could carry was limited, armies had to live off the land. To ensure that soldiers and pack animals were properly fed, campaigns were timed for when grain was ripe and pastures were full. While on campaign, hoplites and other Greek soldiers would have foraged for food, hunted, purchased food from markets and traders, and pillaged towns and villages. Spartan soldiers are known to have brought bread, cheese, wine, and meat with them on campaigns. During wartime, Sparta's slave population, or helots, were promised their freedom if they brought enough supplies to the army, although historians are unsure if these promises would ultimately be honored. Sparta also offered military protection to villages which paid tribute, with villages failing to do so subject to plunder. Spartan soldiers were trained to carry and pilfer food during their childhood in the Agoge. Boys were taught to march long distances while carrying provisions for twenty days. They were also purposely underfed to encourage them to learn to steal food, but harshly punished if they were caught doing it so they would learn to do it stealthily. The Kingdom of Macedon, which conquered large swathes of territory, initially relied on oxen-drawn carts to carry the soldiers' burden, including food. During the reign of Philip II of Macedon, reforms were carried out under which soldiers would be expected to carry much of their own food rather than rely on oxen-drawn carts. This continued under the reign of his son Alexander the Great. During Alexander's conquests, Macedonian soldiers primarily lived off of grain rations. Soldiers were expected to carry their grain rations and cooking utensils in addition to their weaponry, with their backpacks potentially weighing as much as eighty pounds (36 kg). Without the hindrance of oxen and carts, this enabled Macedonian armies to move faster than their opponents. The grain provided to Macedonian soldiers would be wheat, barley, or millet, which were available throughout Asia and could be stored indefinitely when dried. The soldiers would use grinding mills carried by servants to turn the grain into flour, which could then be made into bread, biscuits, and porridge. They also ate various kinds of dried fruits such as dates and figs, which were readily available throughout much of Asia. Whenever possible, they would eat dried meat, salted fish, and shellfish.

In ancient China, soldiers of the Han dynasty ate primarily millet and other grains such as wheat, rice, sorghum, etc. Grains could be eaten as a porridge, boiled, made into a bread or flatbread, smashed and fried in a manner similar to modern fried rice and fried noodles, etc. According to Zhao Chongguo, a military commander of the Han dynasty who served in the first century BC, a force of 10,281 men required 27,363 hu of grain and 308 hu of salt each month, requiring a convoy of 1,500 carts for transport. One hu is equivalent to 19.968 liters, meaning that each soldier would have required 51.9 liters of grain and 0.6 liters of salt per month. Another document at Juyan suggests 3.2 hu, or 63.8 liters, of grain.

=== Post-classical ===
In medieval warfare, military feeding remained essentially the same as it had been in prior centuries. Armies typically had to acquire food supplies from the territory they were passing through. This meant that large-scale looting by soldiers was unavoidable, and was actively encouraged in the 14th century with its emphasis on chevauchée tactics, where mounted troops would burn and pillage enemy territory in order to distract and demoralize the enemy while denying them supplies. Through the medieval period, soldiers were responsible for supplying themselves, either through foraging, looting, or purchases. However, military commanders often provided their troops with food and supplies, but this would be provided instead of the soldiers' wages, or soldiers would be expected to pay for it from their wages, either at cost or even with a profit.

During the Crusades, Crusaders carried foods such as dried meat and grain which could be used to make porridge and bought additional foods such as fruits, vegetables, and cheese locally. They also foraged and plundered for food. During the First Crusade, soldiers would have provided their own food, which could have meant mortgaging property or selling possessions to buy it. At the Siege of Antioch, the Crusaders' food supplies ran so low that a large force was sent away to forage and plunder food, opening the rest of the force up to a counterattack. At the subsequent Siege of Ma'arra, hunger among the Crusaders was so widespread that some resorted to cannibalism, feeding on the bodies of Muslims. During later Crusades, deals were made with the Venetian fleet and merchants to keep soldiers supplied. However, their food supplies were consistently low, to the point that in several battles crusaders would "stop fighting and start eating" upon discovering food in the camps of Muslim armies. During the Third Crusade, an observer noted several kitchens in Saladin's camp with nine large cauldrons each. The armies of the Mongol Empire only had whatever food or livestock they brought from home, and relied on whatever food they could pillage. Mongol soldiers were supplied by their own households and Mongol armies brought along herds of cows and sheep with them on campaign. When livestock was unavailable, they would subsist on rations such as cured meat, dried milk curd, and mare's milk, both fresh and fermented into kumis, as well as hunt local game. According to Marco Polo, a Mongol cavalryman could go ten days without having to cook, and in such situations would rely on ten pounds (4.5 kg) of dried milk curd, two liters of kumis, and a quantity of cured meat. In the Ottoman Empire, janissaries were some of the most well-fed soldiers of the era, with access to a variety of foods. Their diet largely consisted of freshly baked bread and biscuits when bread was unavailable, as well as a daily meat ration of about 200 grams of lamb or mutton, coffee, rice, and bulgur. Biscuits were of particular importance. An observer noted around 105 ovens in Istanbul dedicated solely to baking for military purposes.

In feudal Japan and the Sengoku period, military nutrition habits depended on the daimyo commanding them:

- Mōri Motonari issued each soldier a bag of rice, fried rice, and mochi, the latter of which was chosen due to its portability, long shelf life, ability to provide high energy in small amounts, and Motonari's personal preference for it.
- Uesugi Kenshin would prepare massive feasts for his army before battles, known as kachidoki-meshi ("victory cry meals"), featuring delicacies such as "a mountain of rice ... black-boiled abalone, vinegar-washed fish and jellyfish sashimi, soups with seasonal vegetables and dried fish, walnut-roasted duck, simmered sand borer, and more", though Kenshin himself was noted to eat very little. During battles, Kenshin assembled supply convoys called konidatai staffed by peasants, who would deliver supplies and rations to troops.
- Toyotomi Hideyoshi is said to have regularly distributed food rations out to his officers and soldiers, and kept them well-fed. In one instance, while traveling from Ogaki to Nagahama (a 52 kilometer distance) in 1583, Hideyoshi sent scouts ahead to each village to ask that they prepare rice for Hideyoshi's army; the villages set out rice balls for the soldiers, allowing them to remain fed for the entire trip.

In general, Japanese soldiers would bring uchigaibukuro, pouches used to store rice and medicine, into battle with them. They would also eat miso, dried taro stalk, and okayu as part of a soup prepared in a soldier's jingasa. Soldiers and ninja also used "pills", small ball-shaped medicinal rations consumed in emergencies or long missions, of which there were three types: hyorogan ("ration pills"), made with various flours, sugary substances, and spices to provide quick energy; kikatsugan ("hunger pills"), made with starchy ingredients to provide endurance; and suikitsugan ("thirst pills"), made from umeboshi, bakumondoto, and sugar to encourage saliva production.

Tang dynasty soldiers ate primarily millet porridge, but before a deployment, they would have a large and elaborate banquet, with another large meal before a battle. Song dynasty soldiers were issued money for food and bought meat, vegetables, pickles, and salt locally. Grain supply issues meant they relied less on grain rations than in prior generations. During the Ming dynasty, sesame seed cakes, which could last long periods of time, became standard military food and wheat began to take an important position in rations. The imperial government spent significant amounts of money on the military, investing more into supplying the army with food than previous dynasties. A system of military farmlands, comprising 10% of cultivated land, was organized to supply the army. The state assigned 10% to 20% of military households in each region with running military farms and provided them with seeds and tools to grow grain. Other farmers delivered grain to supplement bad growing seasons. In 1392, this system was designed to feed 1.2 million soldiers. Military advice from the era also suggests plundering seized enemy storehouses and granaries to provision an army.

The Aztecs timed their war seasons to begin just after the harvest. Armies would be equipped with foodstuffs such as toasted tortillas, beans, chilies, dried meats such as venison, turkey, and peccary, and cacao paste. Armies on campaign brought along young cadet soldiers who acted as porters, carrying up to 50 pounds (23 kg) of supplies and equipment each. Soldiers heading off on campaign would receive contributions from their families and communities. While on the move, armies collected food from tributary cities. Messengers were sent ahead of an approaching army to demand stockpiled tribute. Refusal to contribute was seen as an act of rebellion.

The Inca Empire ensured that its armies could frequently be resupplied while on the move. Inca armies moved along an extensive road system dotted with waystations that ensured troops did not have to march more than 20 kilometers without being resupplied. Their supplies were carried by llamas as well as porters. Food and weapons were stockpiled in storehouses called qullqa that dotted the countryside, which armies could draw upon as they moved. The Incas strictly prohibited their soldiers from looting local communities, punishing such offenses with execution. The food eaten by soldiers was largely the same as that consumed by the civilian population in daily life, although they probably ate dehydrated food more frequently. Therefore, staples would have included corn, potatoes, and quinoa. Beans, lima beans, yucca, yams, arracacia, caigua, pumpkin, and squash were available depending on the region. Wild vegetables eaten included cochayuyo, watercress, and cattail. Fruits consumed included lucuma, pacay, guava, and cucumbers. Meat came from either domesticated animals such as llamas, alpacas, and guinea pigs, or wild animals such as guanacos, vicuñas, deer, viscacha, partridges, doves, and ducks. Fish was also available. These foods would have been cooked and served in various ways. While on campaign, Incan armies made frequent use of dehydrated foods that could be prepared, preserved, and transported in sufficient quantities. During marches through desert regions, soldiers relied on a combination of dehydrated foods and fresh meat from the llamas accompanying the army as a means of transport.

=== Early modern ===
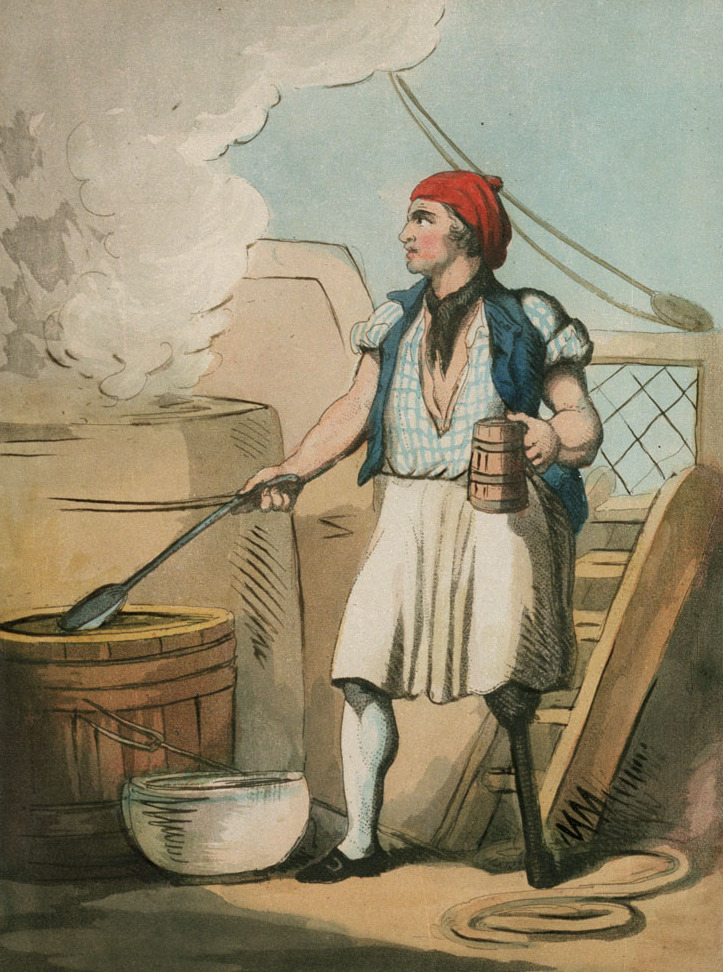
1799 illustration of a Royal Navy cook

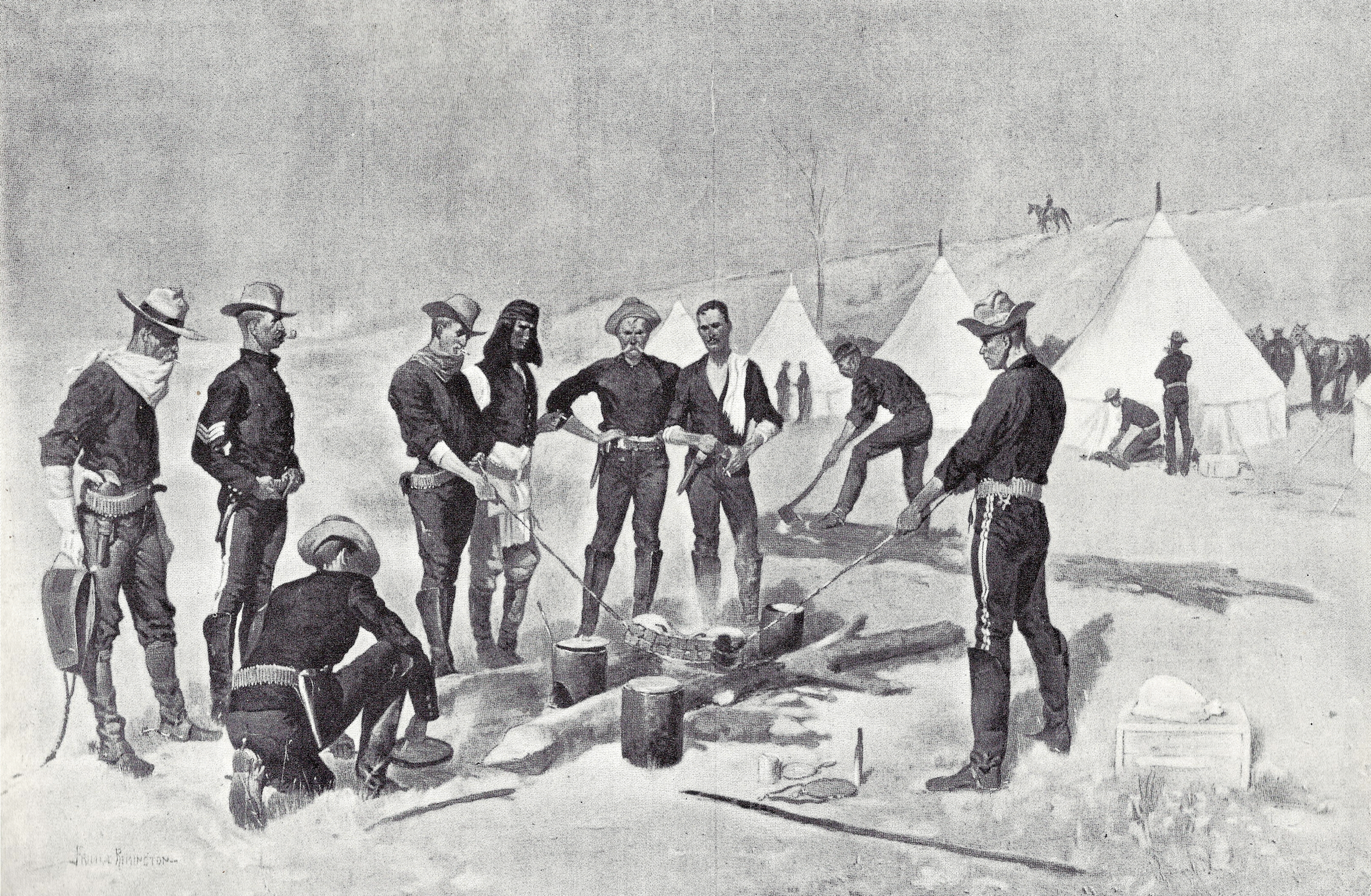
1892 illustration of American soldiers making roast beef for Christmas dinner

By the era of early modern warfare, military food had improved to a relatively significant degree.

During French and Indian War, a theatre of the Seven Years' War, the British had a detailed ration system, assigning each soldier a set daily provision of bread, fresh meat, butter, peas, and rice or oatmeal. The bread could be substituted for flour, hardtack, or cornmeal when necessary. Additional provisions such as fruits, vegetables, and cheese were issued when available. The daily allowance was sufficient for garrison duty but had to be supplemented in field conditions to give sufficient energy.

The main problem was the lack of fresh food, particularly fresh vegetables, which often led to outbreaks of scurvy. To avoid this, local spruce beer began to be used to supplement the rations (it provided the soldiers with additional vitamin C). Spruce beer was not consistently used, however, but primarily in reaction to occurrences of scurvy. An army brewery was founded at Fort Pitt in 1765. In field conditions, the soldiers often went hungry as the supply chains could not be maintained due to long distances, primitive transportation and difficult terrain. Fresh food was also easily spoiled during hot summers.

The Royal Navy relied on hardtack, salted meat, and alcoholic drinks (originally beer but later rum). The Continental Army of the Revolutionary War-era United States had, on paper, plentiful rations including salted meat, legumes, grains, bread, milk, and alcohol, with jerky and hardtack if those foods were not available. In 1775, the Continental Congress determined a ration that included either one pound (450 g) of beef, three-quarters pound (340 g) of pork, or one pound (450 g) of salted fish per day, as well as one pound (450 g) of flour or bread per day, one pint of milk per day, one quart of spruce beer or cider per day, three pounds (1.4 kg) of peas or beans per week, one pint of rice per week, and a small amount of molasses. However, in reality, the Continental Army had difficulties supplying its units. Congress lacked the authority to raise sufficient taxes and transportation and other supply issues compounded the problem. In reality, soldiers might receive some flour and perhaps a small amount of meat or fish. In order to preserve the food, meat was often salted and the flour would often be baked into hard biscuits. As these rations had hardly any nutrients, a weekly ration of vinegar or sauerkraut was eventually added to try to prevent scurvy, but this was insufficient. Sometimes days would pass between rations. Soldiers had to resort to foraging, with those who understood the local vegetation being able to find food in woods around the camps. At Valley Forge, watercress and sorrel were sometimes foraged to provide the troops with some vegetables. Soldiers at times had to hunt whatever animals they could find and beg civilians for food. They also bought food when possible, but this proved difficult as the Continental Army mostly paid in promissory notes which were widely distrusted and many soldiers had little goods or money to trade. The situation deteriorated to the point that Congress pressured George Washington to permit the seizure of food and the use of low-value currency as compensation, but he declined, fearing that this would alienate civilians. However, soldiers at times resorted to stealing food, and although they stood trial, Washington was lenient on them as he understood their desperation. During the Continental Army's encampment at Morristown, New Jersey, Washington enlisted the aid of the local magistrate to request that food be provided in exchange for promises to pay it back, with the magistrate impressing the amount of food requested if local farmers refused.

During the Napoleonic Wars, the Grande Armée had a ration of 24 ounces (680 g) of bread, one-half pound (230 g) of meat, one ounce (28 g) of rice or two ounces (57 g) of dried beans, peas, or lentils, one imperial quart (1.1 L) of wine, one gill of brandy, and a half-gill of vinegar. However, in practice this was only possible when units were well-supplied, and troops in the field "spent most of their time desperately hungry", relying on doughboys and "out of the ground" crops such as potatoes and maize, which required minimal cooking and had recently become common across European farms.

The Napoleonic Wars also spurred the development of canned food, which would become a mainstay of military rations. The lack of fruits and vegetables in the diets of French soldiers was detrimental to their health. In 1795, observing the toll that poor nutrition took on his men, Napoleon announced a prize of 12,000 francs to anyone who could improve upon the prevailing food preservation methods of the time. In 1810, Nicholas Appert claimed the prize after devising a method of preserving food in which tightly sealing food inside a bottle and maintaining it at high temperature for certain period of time made the food safe for consumption until opening, using glass jars sealed with corks and boiling water. A trial in which food preserved by this method was sent overseas with French troops succeeded. Appert was given the money on condition that he make his discovery public, and duly published The Art of Preserving Animal and Vegetable Substances. The French Navy began using his methods. The Grande Armée experimented with issuing canned foods to its soldiers. However, the slow process of canning and the even slower development and transport stages prevented large amounts from being shipped across the French Empire, and the wars ended before the process was perfected. A major difficulty that presented itself was the use of glass, which was heavy, fragile, and could explode under internal pressure. Appert's work was improved upon by Philippe de Girard in 1811, when he pioneered a method of preserving food in metal cans. It was patented in Britain on his behalf by Peter Durand, who took the credit as its inventor. Girard, a Frenchman, preferred the entrepreneurial environment of Britain, but could not have taken out a patent in a country with which his own country was at war with. Durand sold the patent to Bryan Donkin, who spent two years perfecting the method. Canned food subsequently began to be issued to the Royal Navy. The reason for lack of spoilage was unknown at the time, since it would be until the 1860s before Louis Pasteur demonstrated the role of microbes in food spoilage and developed pasteurization.

The Crimean War saw issues with supplying soldiers in battle. In the British Army, rations were regularly halved, and many soldiers developed scurvy, to the point that the hospital in Scutari received more soldiers for scurvy than battle wounds. During the American Civil War, the food and rations of the Union Army and the Confederate States Army were meant to be mostly the same—meat, cornmeal, vegetables, vinegar, molasses, and hardtack—but supply issues plagued the Confederates as the war continued, forcing them to live off the land. The standard Union Army ration was roughly three-quarters pound (340 g) of meat, one pound (450 g) of flour or cornmeal, vegetables, vinegar, and molasses. To ensure that food lasted longer, rations often came in the form of hardtack biscuits, salted meat, and dehydrated vegetables. During campaigns, particularly as Union troops entered the south, seasonal fruits and vegetables were pillaged from farms and orchards. Both the Union and Confederate armies relied on lakes and streams for their water.

=== Modern ===
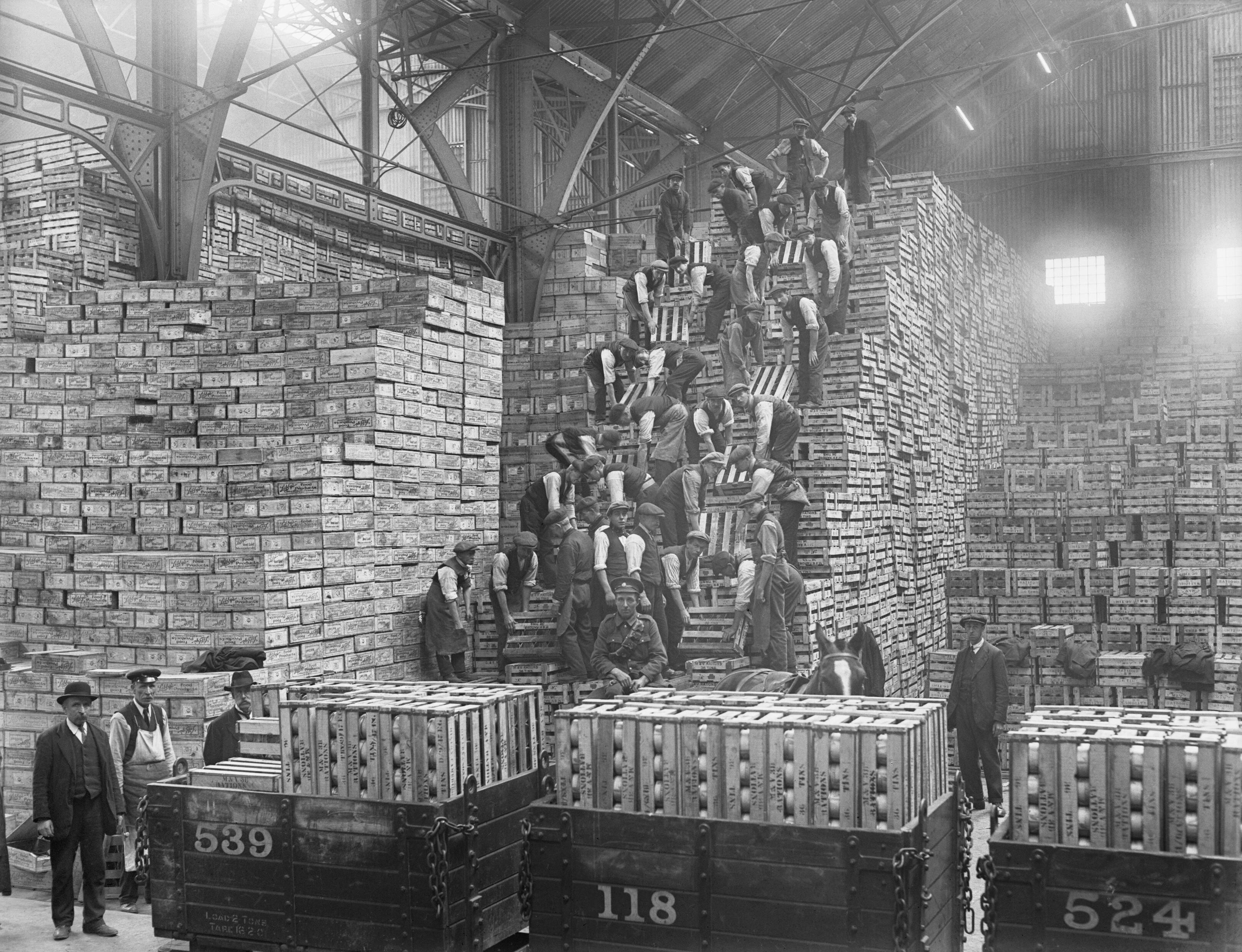
A British rations warehouse during World War I, illustrating the logistical challenges of feeding an army

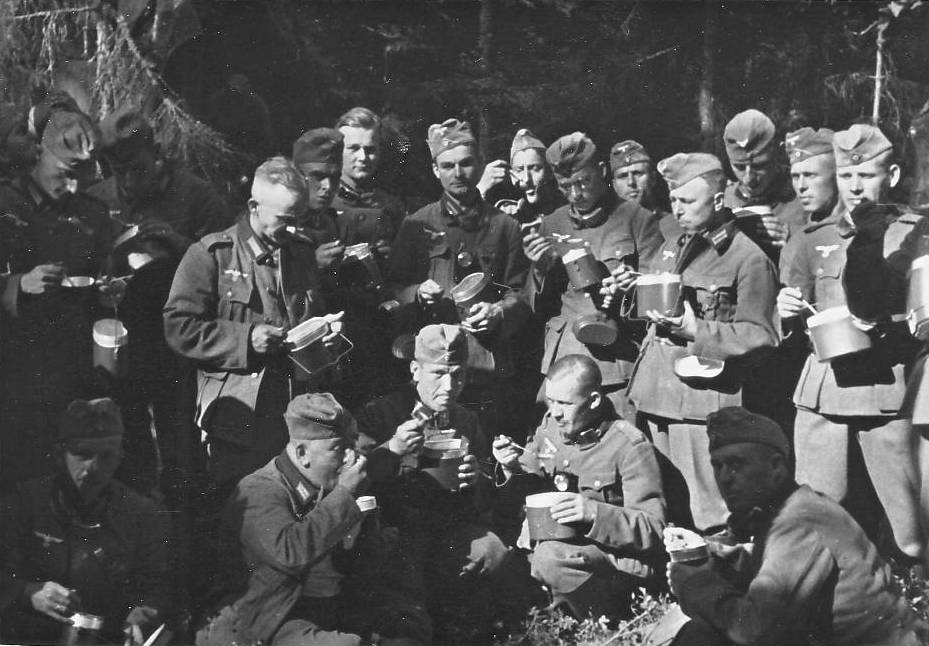
Wehrmacht soldiers eating lunch during a military exercise in 1939

The era of modern warfare saw significant improvements in the shelf life, variety, and quality of military rations and nutrition.

==== World War I ====
In World War I, both Allied and Central Powers soldiers had relatively sufficient food supplies due to the static nature of trench warfare. British, French, Canadian, and ANZAC soldiers were regularly issued "dull" foods such as bully beef, biscuits, pudding, and Maconochie (tinned meat, potato, and vegetable stew), the latter of which was vilified for its poor quality, especially if not sufficiently heated.

British Indian Army soldiers reportedly ate very well compared to their European comrades, with regular access to fresh food such as goat meat and rotis; British logistics also accommodated for vegetarian Indians by providing them with dal, gur, and milk instead of meat. This treatment was supposedly to prevent a mutiny similar to the Indian Rebellion of 1857, which was partially caused by indifference to Indian religious needs.

The American Expeditionary Forces had a variety of different rations issued to them, organized based on freshness and purpose, and were generally considered well-fed compared to their British and European contemporaries. Imperial German Army soldiers had mostly the same foodstuffs with more reliance on potatoes over grains, but as the war progressed and food supplies lowered due to restrictions, the German military was forced to gradually reduce their meat rations, instituting meat-free days once per week and making meat a rarity among German soldiers.

==== World War II ====
By World War II, rations had taken modern organized forms for both the Allies and the Axis. The United States Armed Forces revised their World War I-era ration organization system into an alphabetized system: A-rations of fresh food, B-rations of packaged unprepared food, C-rations of prepared canned food, D-rations of chocolate, and K-rations of three-course meals. The US military also issued the 10-in-1 food parcel, designed to supply ten soldiers. A-rations, designed for troops in garrison, included foods such as fresh meat, vegetables, fruits, coffee, and sugar. B-rations, intended for preparation by cooks in field kitchens, contained essentially the same types of foods as A-rations except canned for better preservation. C-rations, intended for troops in the field lacking access to fresh or packaged unprepared food, contained several variations of food combinations, among them meat and beans (including pork and beans), ham, eggs, and potatoes, and chicken and vegetables. D-rations consisted of chocolate bars designed to give needed calories in case soldiers in the field were isolated from any other food source. K-rations were issued to mobile soldiers such as paratroopers, tank crews, and motorcycle couriers. They contained foods such as canned meat, with some canned meat issued together with eggs, carrot or apple, sugar or malted milk tablets, fruit bars, oatmeal, cheese, biscuits, powdered fruit drinks, salt, and chewing gum. A typical 10-in-1 food parcel included canned items as butter-substitute spread, soluble coffee, pudding, meat units, jam, evaporated milk, and vegetables as well as biscuits, cereal, beverages, candy, salt, and sugar.

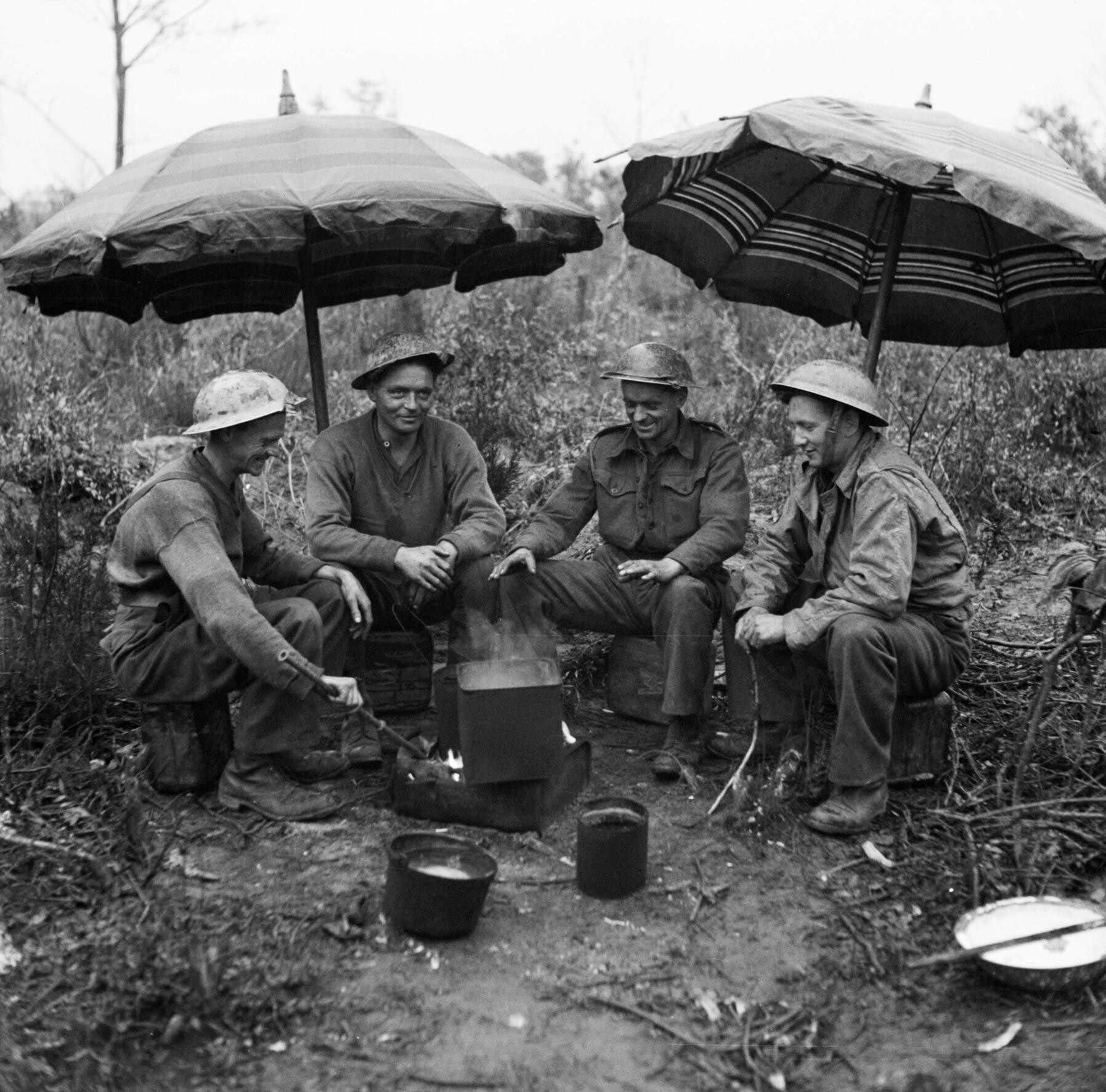
Royal Artillery gunners brewing tea over a Benghazi burner, 27 February 1944

British soldiers were fed freshly cooked meals when in camp or barracks and troops on deployment could eat meals from field kitchens whenever possible, but soldiers were also reliant on rations. The British Army issued 24-hour rations intended to sustain troops until composite rations and fresh food could be supplied by field kitchens. An example of such a 24 hour ration pack issued to British and Commonwealth soldiers contained the following: 10 biscuits, two oatmeal blocks, milk, sugar, and tea blocks, four tablets of sugar, one block of meat, two pieces of raisin chocolate and one piece of plain chocolate, boiled sweets, one packet of salt, meat extract tablets, two packets of chewing gum, and four pieces of latrine paper. Composite rations, known as "compo" rations or 14-man rations, were designed to sustain 14 men for one day and came in wooden crates. A composite ration crate would include meats such as bully beef, sausage, spam, steak and kidney pudding, fruit pudding, treacle pudding, soup, beans, cheese, biscuits, jam, margarine, tea, powdered milk, and sugar. The composite ration was introduced at the end of the North African campaign to alleviate nutritional problems caused by Commonwealth rations in North African being largely bully beef and biscuits. Prior to its introduction tinned fruit had been introduced to improve nutrition. On the home front in Britain, mobile canteens were operated to provide Home Guard and civil defence authorities with hot food and fresh tea. A similar system applied to Canadian soldiers. Whenever possible Canadian soldiers were supplied with fresh food, and each company, battery, or squadron had its own cookhouse. During lulls in the fighting freshly cooked meals would be brought by vehicle from cookhouses, which were well behind the lines, to soldiers at the front. Canadian soldiers were likewise provided with 14-man composite or "compo" rations for times when they could not be supplied with fresh food. The Australian Army likewise established kitchens and issued rations to frontline troops. Australian rations were initially based around bully beef and biscuits. However, the New Guinea campaign posed special problems for feeding troops on the front line. Due to the harsh terrain it proved difficult to supply food and other critical items to Australian soldiers fighting there, and as a result airdrops were adopted but these too were not always adequate, meaning that Australian soldiers were often hungry. The typical rations were also inadequate for fighting in the environment of New Guinea, and soldiers began experiencing various health problems due to nutritional deficiency. As a result, the Australian Army upgraded its basic ration of tinned meat, salt, biscuits, tea, sugar, and dried milk to new rations that added various items such as tinned fruit, dried potatoes, sausage, vegetables, jam, butter, and beans. In addition, dehydrated mutton was a popular ration, and wheat porridge and Tasmanian blue peas were incorporated into rations. The Australian Army Catering Corps was established in 1943.

The British Indian Army fed its soldiers according to religious and caste sensitivities. Each company was assigned two cooks who would be of the proper religion and caste to ensure that food would be prepared in the correct way. Soldiers were also provided with stackable cooking pots to prepare their own meals, which was particularly important to high-caste Brahmin soldiers who had to prepare their own food to preserve their status. Indian soldiers were issued foods such as dehydrated lentils, vegetables, fruit, meat, fish, and marmite. They usually ate their meals in the form of a curry, which would be seasoned with various powdered spices. Curries would typically be eaten with roti flatbreads. Indian soldiers also foraged for foods such as fresh poultry, fish, and eggs whenever possible. Chocolate bars fortified with vitamins were issued as an emergency ration suitable for any Indian regardless of caste. Indian troops were also issued with 24-hour operational rations incorporating biscuits, chocolate, cheese, sardines, sugar, milk powder, tea, and salt, and eight-man composite rations incorporating tins of mutton.

Red Army soldiers received rye bread, potatoes, vegetables, pasta, meat, and fish (in order of quantity). The Chinese Second United Front had ample food supplies, but food was strained after 1940, when food panics and requirements for peasants to feed Chinese soldiers led to agricultural failures and severe inflation. Throughout most of the war, the National Revolutionary Army issued rations consisting solely of rice to its soldiers, supplying an average of 2.5 cups of rice per day. Soldiers were expected to forage for additional foods such as wild onions, garlic, mushrooms, and leeks to eat with their rice and to purchase extra food in local markets with their military pay. Their ability to purchase food varied with price fluctuations. Rationing proved a point of contention between Chinese commanders and their American advisors, who insisted that Chinese soldiers were underfed and in particular required more meat. In February 1945 a new ration was officially adopted in a Sino-American conference which incorporated rice, vegetables, beans, peanuts, salt, and meat, with alternatives such as eggs and fish for when meat was unavailable, but implementation proved difficult in practice.

The German Wehrmacht received basic rations of hard bread and canned meat (usually pork, roast beef, turkey, or chicken, though cans labeled Fleischkonserve—literally translated as "can of meat"—went unidentified), with each soldier typically carrying a daily supply consisting of a 11-ounce (300 g) tin of meat and a 4.4-to-5.3-ounce (125 to 150 g) piece of hard bread. Soldiers were also issued canned tomato soup, condensed milk, and Erbswurst (a compact peasemeal sausage that can be dissolved to make pea soup). Elite units received more unique high-energy food. For example, before combat missions Fallschirmjäger soldiers received the "Combat Ration for Paratroopers", which contained tins of cheese and ham, an energy bar, crispbread, candy drops, powdered milk, and instant coffee. The standard Schutzstaffel (SS) ration, designed to last for four days, consisted of 25 ounces (710 g) of Graubrot, 6–10 ounces (170–280 g) of canned meat (sometimes in the form of sausage), five ounces (140 g) of vegetables, one-half ounce (14 g) of butter, margarine, jam, or hazelnut paste, coffee, and six cigarettes (despite the SS's strong anti-smoking stance). Some other special supplements were given, including leberwurst. Regions invaded and occupied by Nazi forces were stripped of their food to feed Germans and starve local populations. As a result, soldiers could eat a variety of foods depending on availability. When in static positions German soldiers could eat well while rationing for frontline soldiers was sometimes hampered by supply issues. For example, a German soldier who fought in Crimea, which presented a logistical challenge due to a long and vulnerable land route, described the food he and his comrades received during this period as consisting of one warm meal a day, typically cabbage soup with a piece of tomato, with the addition of half a loaf of bread, some fat, cheese, and hard honey every second day. However, when the same soldier was billeted in a Russian village, he described the food as including a midday meal of borscht with bread and a large evening meal of potatoes, other vegetables, eggs, and meat. In North Africa, the Wehrmacht shipped in fresh fruit from Italy and Greece to supplement its troops' rations, even during the Great Famine in Greece.

The Imperial Japanese Army and Navy received rather basic rations, usually consisting of rice with barley, meat or fish, pickled or fresh vegetables, umeboshi, soy sauce, miso or bean paste, and green tea. The rations were intended to be eaten with other foraged food. Japanese soldiers were also issued emergency rations. The standard emergency ration, intended to last for five days, included a small sack of rice, package of compact food, package of hardtack, one-half pound (230 g) of hard candy, can of tea, and vitamin pills. Japanese soldiers also hunted dogs, goats, and other small animals to add to their emergency rations. In the Burma campaign, two types of emergency rations were used, "A" rations intended for three days consisting of 19 ounces (540 g) of rice and a small can of beef and vegetables, and "B" rations intended for one day consisting of three bags of hard biscuits. They were meant to be eaten only upon orders from a commanding officer when the unit was separated from its supply column. Japanese soldiers were often undersupplied. Japanese commanders had a cavalier attitude to food supplies for their troops and supply lines were often not protected. As a result, about 60% of Japanese military deaths during the war were due to starvation.

The Royal Italian Army ate mainly pasta, white bread, oatmeal, meat, fish, broth, salad, sugar, cheese, and butter from their field kitchens, with alcohol and desserts also issued. However, on the front, Italian soldiers often had to live off of canned tuna, ham, soup, black bread, and pasta. The canned food issued to soldiers on deployment was of low quality, and Italian soldiers had to drink water out of and cook pasta in unwashed gasoline drums, leading to gasoline-flavored water and pasta. Regular supplies of food were strained by logistical issues during the North African campaign.

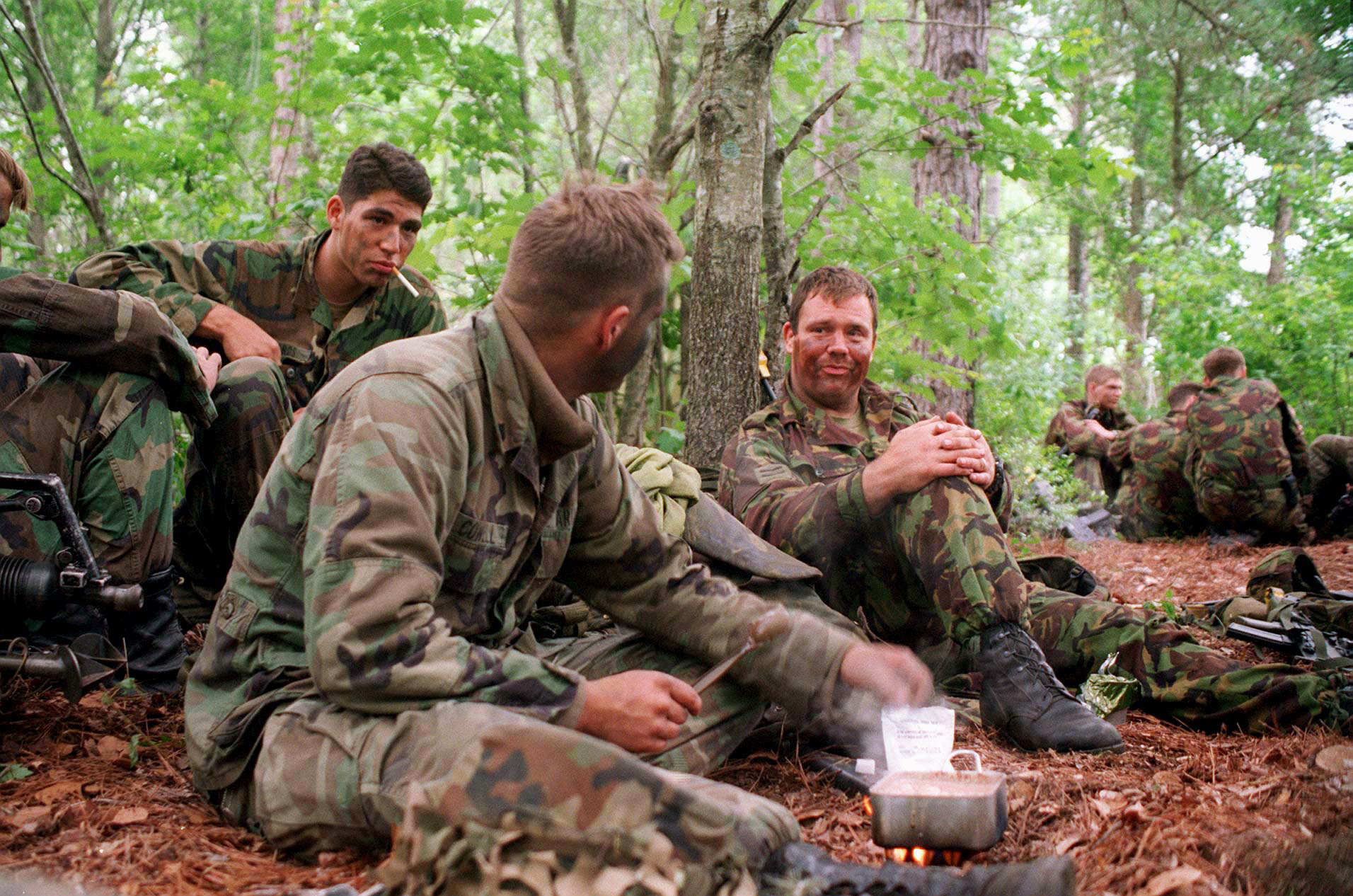
American and British marines conversing while eating field rations during a training exercise in 1996

==== Post-World War II ====
Most modern and currently-issued rations were developed during and after the Cold War. The Soviet Armed Forces issued their personnel a very basic ration of tushonka, bread or crackers, and condensed milk, with little variety. Both the West German Bundeswehr and the East German National People's Army issued 24-hour rations containing four meals each, though their contents and types varied.

The U.S. military, initially issuing the canned Meal, Combat, Individual (similar to the C-ration) from the late 1950s through the Vietnam War, developed the Meal, Ready-to-Eat (MRE) in 1983, designed to provide easy-to-prepare individual meals in retort pouches that could last for very long periods of time. The British 24-hour ration gradually advanced from tinned rations to freeze-dried and vacuum-sealed rations.

The Russian invasion of Ukraine challenged the ability of Russia to provision its soldiers. In the early days of the conflict in spring 2022, the Russian Ground Forces had to contend with low supplies of rations, which led them to forage for provisions in a manner reminiscent of the practices of ancient armies.

== See also ==
- Armed Forces Recipe Service
- Army Catering Corps
- History of military nutrition in the United States
- Humanitarian daily ration
- Mess kit
