= Imperial Japanese rations =

Field rations of the Imperial Japanese military

Imperial Japanese rations were the field rations issued by Imperial Japan in World War II, and which reflected the culture of the Japanese military. Rations had to be stout, durable, simple, sturdy and had to survive without refrigeration for long periods of time. Typically each ration was served in the field in canned food boxes, and cooked near the battlefield. The mess tin was known as a han-gou.

The rations issued by the Imperial Japanese Government usually consisted of rice with barley, meat or fish, pickled or fresh vegetables, umeboshi, shoyu sauce, miso or bean paste, and green tea. A typical field ration would have 28 oz (790 g) of rice, usually mixed with barley to combat nutritional deficiencies such as beriberi. Often, soldiers would forage for fresh fruit to provide vitamins.

Typically ¼ cup of canned tuna, or sausages, and/or squid would be cooked from either captured locations or hunting in the nearby area. Preserved foods from Japan typically were issued sparingly. Other foods issued included 1¼ cups of canned cabbage, coconut, sweet potato, burdock, lotus root, taro, bean sprouts, peaches, mandarin oranges, lychee or beans. 3 teaspoons of pickled radish (typically daikon), pickled cucumber, umeboshi, scallions and ginger added flavor to the rations. Sometimes less than an ounce of dried seaweed, was issued for making onigiri in the field, or beer and/or sake was issued to help boost morale.

== Field rations ==
Two types of rations were issued- normal rations for mealtimes, and special rations to be carried by the soldier.

=== Normal ration ===
A single ration of this type included the following:

- 660 g (23.28 oz) of rice
- 209 g (7.37 oz) of barley
- 209 g (7.37 oz) of raw meat
- 600 g (21.16 oz) of vegetables
- 60 g (2.11 oz) of pickles
- small quantities of flavoring, salt, and sugar

=== Special ration ===
A single ration included the following:

- 580 g (20.46 oz) of rice (probably polished)
- 230 g (8.113 oz) of biscuits
- 150 g (5.3 oz) of canned meat (or 60 g (2.1 oz) of dried meat)
- 120 g (4.23 oz) of dried vegetables
- 31 g (1.09 oz) of dried plums, and small quantities of salt, sugar, and sometimes a can of beer or sake

== Emergency rations ==
Five days worth of rations were issued to each soldier for emergency use. The ration consisted of:

- Small sack of rice
- Package of compact food
- Package of hardtack
- Can of tea
- Half a pound of hard candy
- Vitamin pills

During the Burma campaign, the Japanese used two types of emergency rations, the "A" scale and "B" scale. Each soldier carried three days of the "A" scale and one day of the "B" scale. Neither type was to be eaten, except on orders of the commanding officer when the unit was separated from its supply column. Each ration under the "A" scale consisted of about 1 pound and 3 ounces of rice (enough for two meals) and one small can of mixed beef and vegetables. The soldier usually cooked the rice in a small bucket carried for this purpose. The "B" scale ration consisted of three paper bags of hard biscuits (enough for three meals).

== See also ==
- List of military rations
- Bento
- Canned food
- Military nutrition
- Ninja diet
