= Koek-en-zopie =

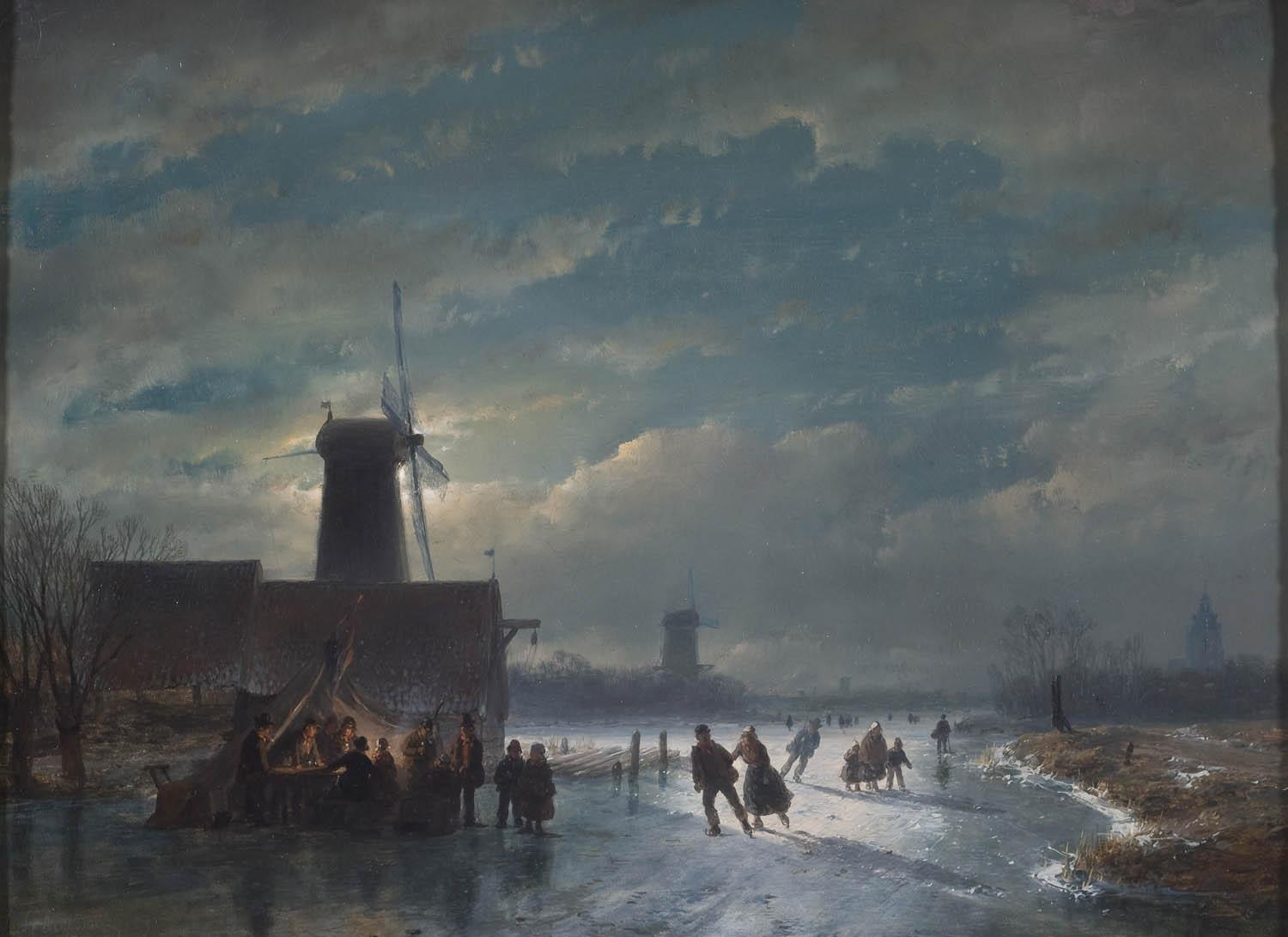
Winter scene with koek-en-zopie by night. Andreas Schelfhout, 1849

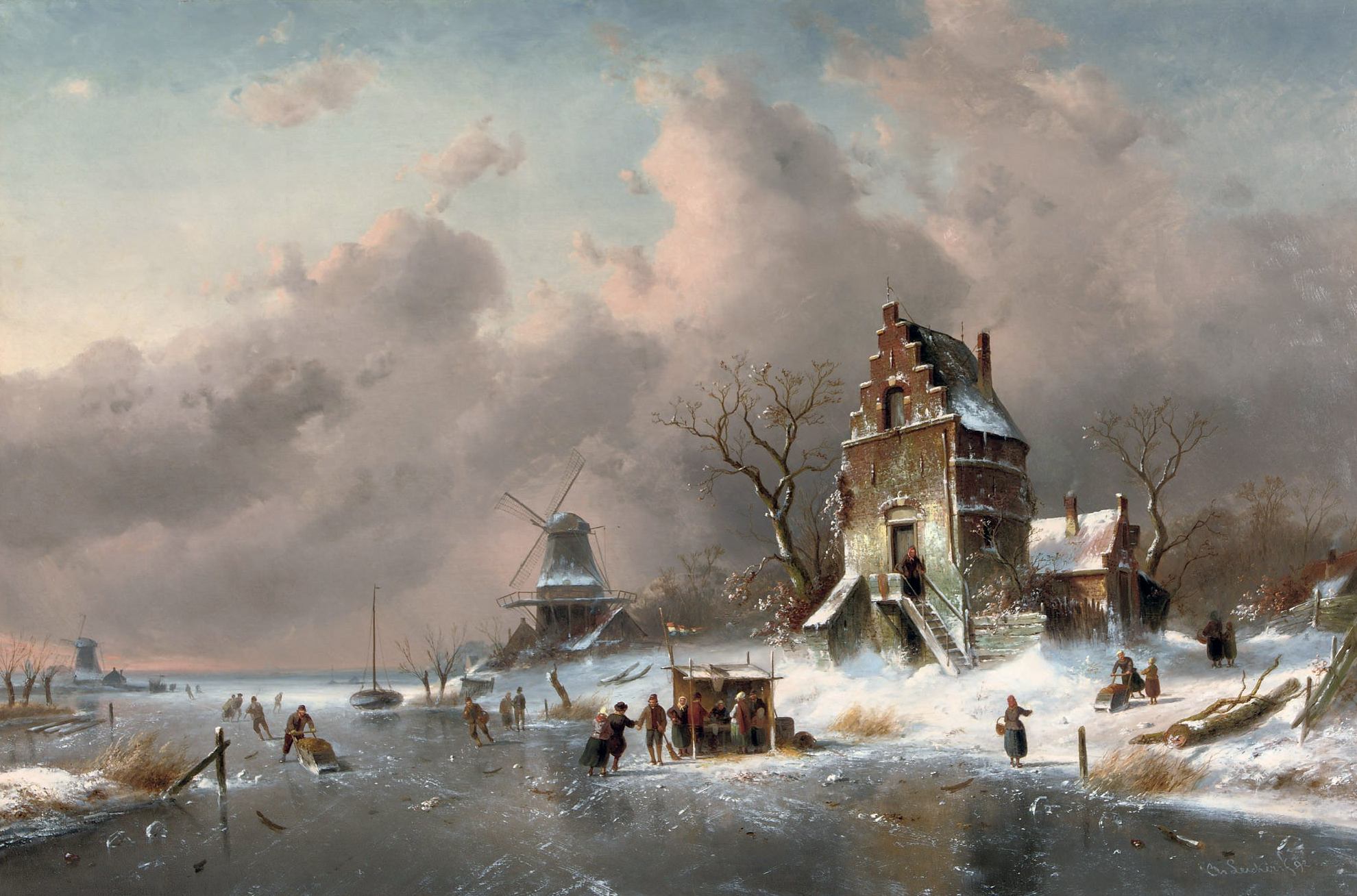
Many ice-skaters at a koek-en-zopie stall on a frozen waterway. Charles Leickert, 1892

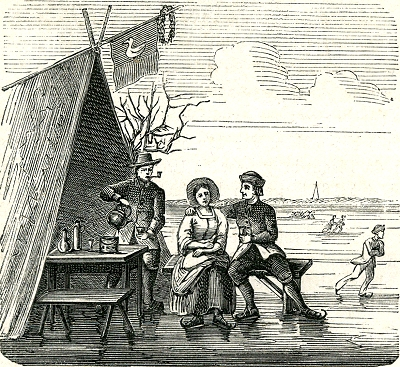
Koek-en-zopie on a woodcut from 1779

Koek-en-zopie (roughly translated as "cake-and-drinks" or "cake-and-eggnog") is a Dutch term that is used to denote the food and drink sold on the ice during periods of ice skating.

From the 17th century up to and including the 20th century, the fare would have been anything suitable for eating by hand, such as a pancake. These would have been cooked over an open fire on land until the introduction of a small Franklin stove allowed a form of cooking on ice. For the thirsty, there was a semi-fluid zopie, consisted of a mixture of bock and home-made rum and other local ingredients. Later, koek-en-zopie stalls often sold warm drinks such as punch.

Nowadays, the stalls primarily serve hot chocolate, pea soup, mulled wine and cookies or cake.

Until the 19th century, only shops selling alcoholic beverages on land or water were bound by law. As long as there was ice for the koek-en-zopie stalls to stand on, they enjoyed protection from regulations. Gambling and prostitution stalls were occasionally established on the ice in cities for the same reason.
