= Pea soup =

Soup made from dried peas

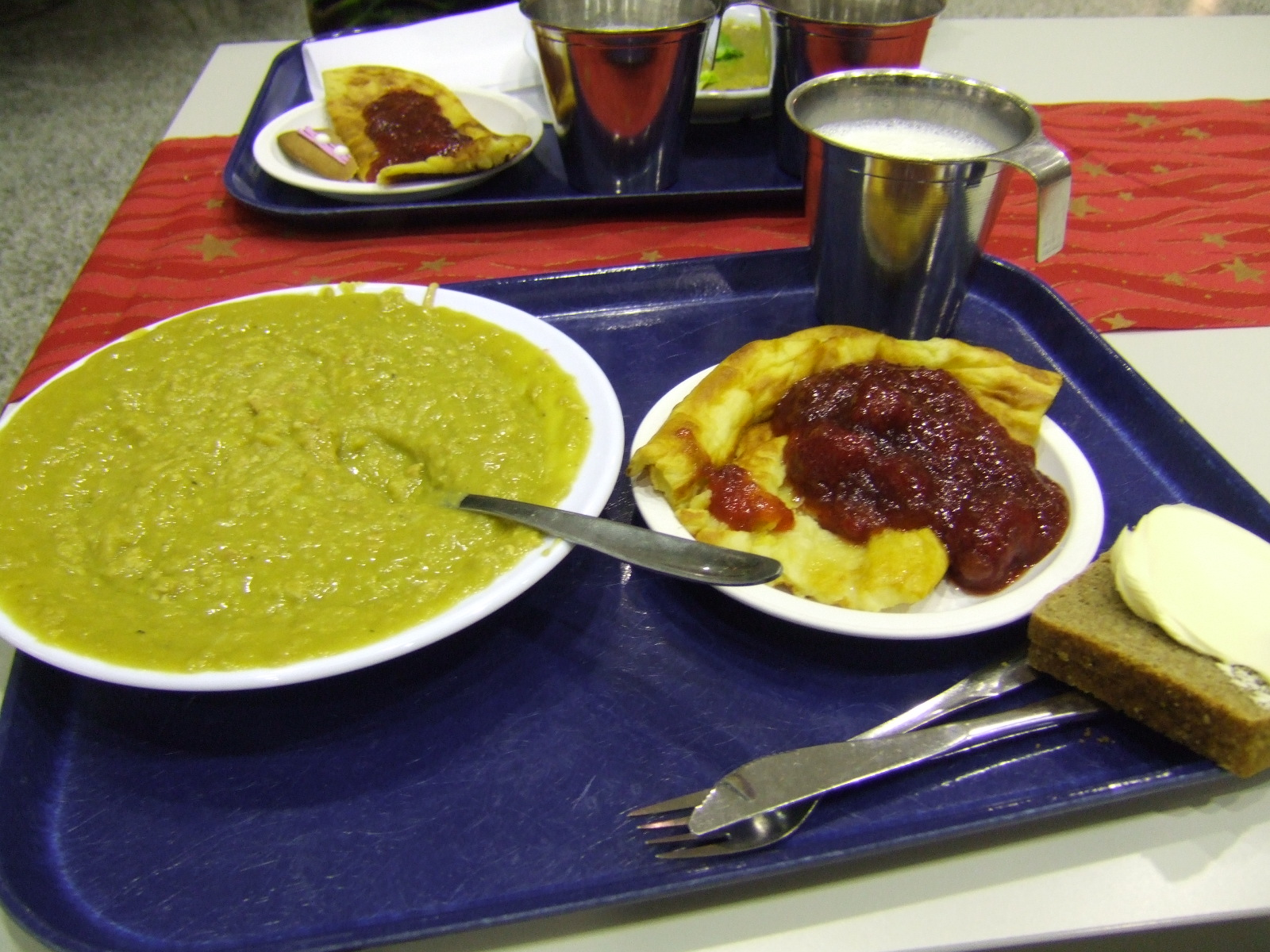
- Finnish pea soup and pancakes served by the Finnish Defence Forces
- Alternative names: Split pea soup
- Type: Soup
- Place of origin: Ancient Greece or Ancient Rome
- Main ingredients: Dried peas (split pea)

Pea soup or split pea soup is soup made typically from dried peas, such as the split pea. It appears in the cuisine of many cultures, with a wide range of variations. It is most often greyish-green or yellow in color depending on the regional variety of peas used; all are cultivars of Pisum sativum. Pea soup has been eaten since antiquity and is mentioned in the works of Aristophanes.

== History ==
Pea soup has been eaten since antiquity; it is mentioned in Aristophanes' The Birds, and according to one source "the Greeks and Romans were cultivating this legume about 500 400 BC. During that era, vendors in the streets of Athens were selling hot pea soup."

Eating fresh "garden" peas before they were matured was a luxurious innovation of the Early Modern period: by contrast with the coarse, traditional peasant fare of pease pottage (or pease porridge), Potage Saint-Germain, made of fresh peas and other fresh greens braised in light stock and puréed, was an innovation sufficiently refined that it could be served to Louis XIV, after whose court at Château de Saint-Germain-en-Laye it was named (c. 1660–1680).

== Around the world ==
=== Australia ===
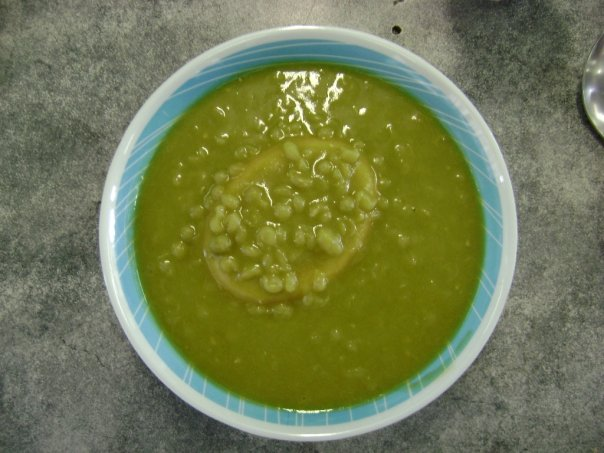
Pie floater from a pie cart in Adelaide

The pie floater is an Australian dish particularly common in Adelaide. It consists of a meat pie in a thick pea soup, typically with the addition of tomato sauce. Believed to have been first created in the 1890s, the pie floater gained popularity as a meal sold by South Australian pie carts.

A pie floater commonly consists of a traditional Australian-style meat pie, usually sitting, but sometimes submerged (traditionally upside down) in a bowl of thick pea soup made from blue boiler peas.

=== Britain and Ireland ===
A well-known nursery rhyme, the first known written reference of which dates to 1765, speaks of

Pease pudding hot,
Pease pudding cold,
Pease pudding in the pot
Nine days old;
Some like it hot,
Some like it cold,
Some like it in the pot,
Nine days old.

"Pease" is the Middle English singular and plural form of the word "pea"—indeed, "pea" began as a back-formation. Pease pudding was a high-protein, low-cost staple of the diet and, made from easily stored dried peas, was an ideal form of food for sailors, particularly boiled in accompaniment with salt pork which is the origin of pea (and ham) soup. Although pease was replaced as a staple by potatoes during the nineteenth century, the food still remains popular in the national diet in the form of "mushy peas" commonly sold as the typical accompaniment to fish and chips, as well as with meat pies.

Pea soup is an English classic with many forms ranging from a thick purée, like mushy peas, to a more liquid dish. It can be made from fresh new peas or dried old peas.

In 19th-century English literature, pea soup is referred to as a simple food and eating it as a sign of poverty. In the Thackeray short story A Little Dinner at Timmins's, when a character asks his wife "Why don't you ask some of our old friends? Old Mrs. Portman has asked us twenty times, I am sure, within the last two years", she replies, with "a look of ineffable scorn", that when "the last time we went there, there was pea-soup for dinner!" In Thomas Hardy's Tess of the D'Urbervilles, Tess remarks that "we have several proofs that we are d'Urbervilles ... we have a very old silver spoon, round in the bowl like a little ladle, and marked with the same castle. But it is so worn that mother uses it to stir the pea-soup."

A soup of this sort made with yellow split peas is called "London particular", after the thick yellow smogs for which London was famous until the Clean Air Act 1956.

==== Scotland ====
Pea and ham soup is a common dish in Scotland, frequently featuring in recipe books. It is made with a boiled ham hock and its resulting stock, and garden peas.

=== Canada ===
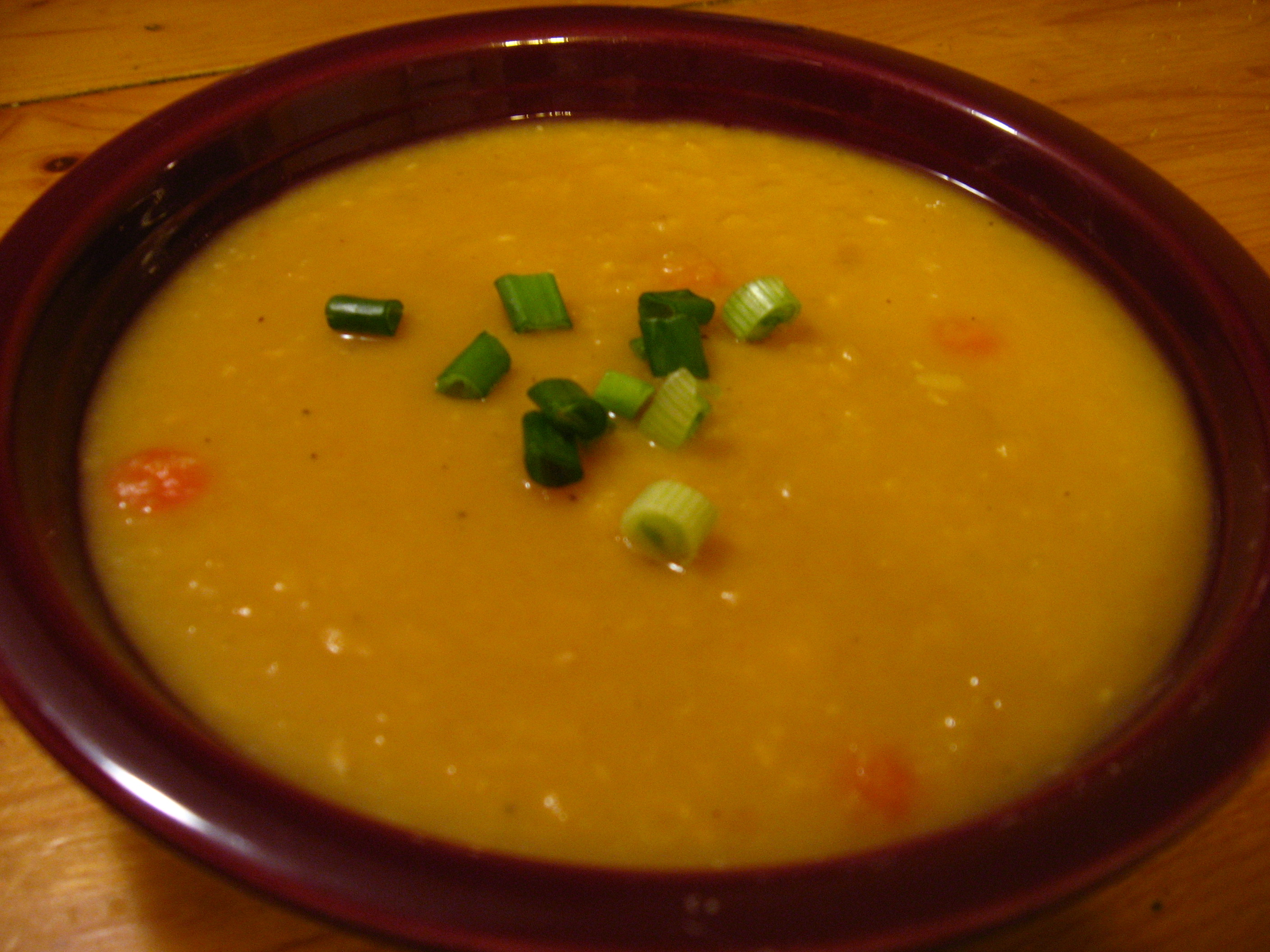
Yellow split pea soup

Soupe aux pois [jaunes] (yellow pea soup) is a traditional dish in Québec cuisine. Traditional Québécois cuisine influenced early Maine cuisine and the cuisine of Vermont.

One source says "The most authentic version of Quebec's soupe aux pois use whole yellow peas, with salt pork, and herbs for flavour. After cooking, the pork is usually chopped and returned to the soup, or sometimes removed to slice thinly and served separately ... Newfoundland Pea Soup is very similar, but usually includes more vegetables such as diced turnips and carrots, and is often topped with small dumplings called dough boys or doughballs."

In Newfoundland, split peas are cooked in a bag as part of a Jiggs dinner, which is known as pease pudding.

Outside Francophone areas, pea soup is sometimes served with johnny cake.

=== Czech Republic ===
In Czech cuisine, pea soup (hrachová polévka, hrachovka) is served as a creamy soup with blended peas. It is typically seasoned with garlic and marjoram and usually served with bacon, sometimes also with cream and croutons. It can be served as a Christmas dish.

=== Germany ===
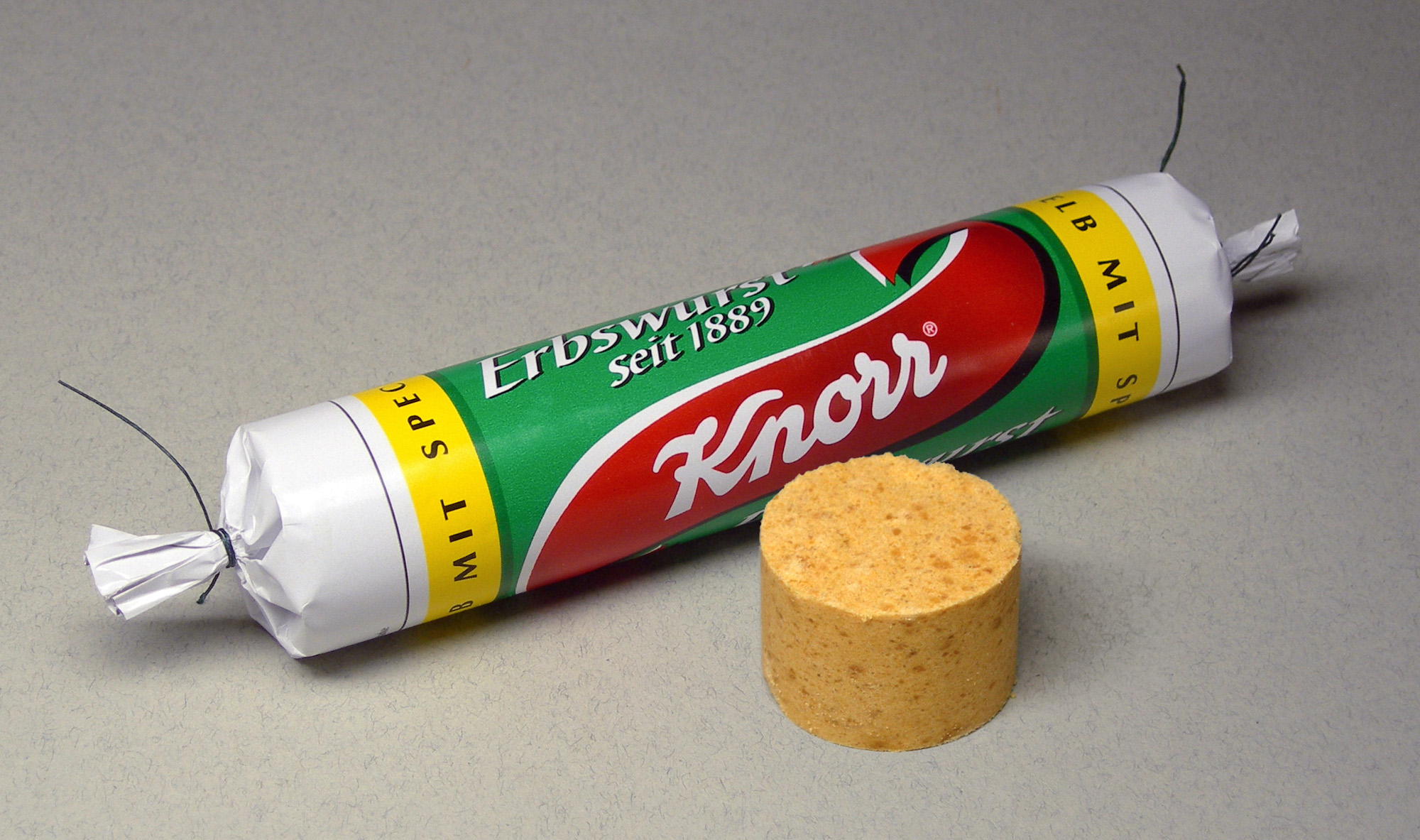
In Germany, instant pea soup was already manufactured in 1889.

Pea soup is a common dish throughout Germany. It often contains meat such as bacon, sausage or Kassler (cured and smoked pork) depending on regional preferences. Very often, several sausages will accompany a serving of pea soup as well as some dark bread. Ready-made soup in cans is sometimes used to prepare the dish.

One of the first instant products was a pea soup product, which mainly consisted of pea meal and beef fat (Erbswurst: pea sausage). It was invented in 1867 by Johann Heinrich Grüneberg, who sold the recipe to the Prussian state. When the Franco-Prussian War broke out, the war ministry, which had previously tested the possibility of feeding soldiers solely on instant pea soup and bread, built a large manufacturing plant and produced between 4,000 and 5,000 tons of Erbswurst for the army during the war. In 1889, the Knorr instant-food company bought the license. Knorr, which is today a Unilever brand, discontinued the production of Erbswurst on December 31, 2018.

=== Indonesia ===
As a former Dutch colony, Indonesia has inherited this dish, known as sup ercis or erwtensoep, as a result of Dutch–Indonesian culture.

=== Netherlands ===
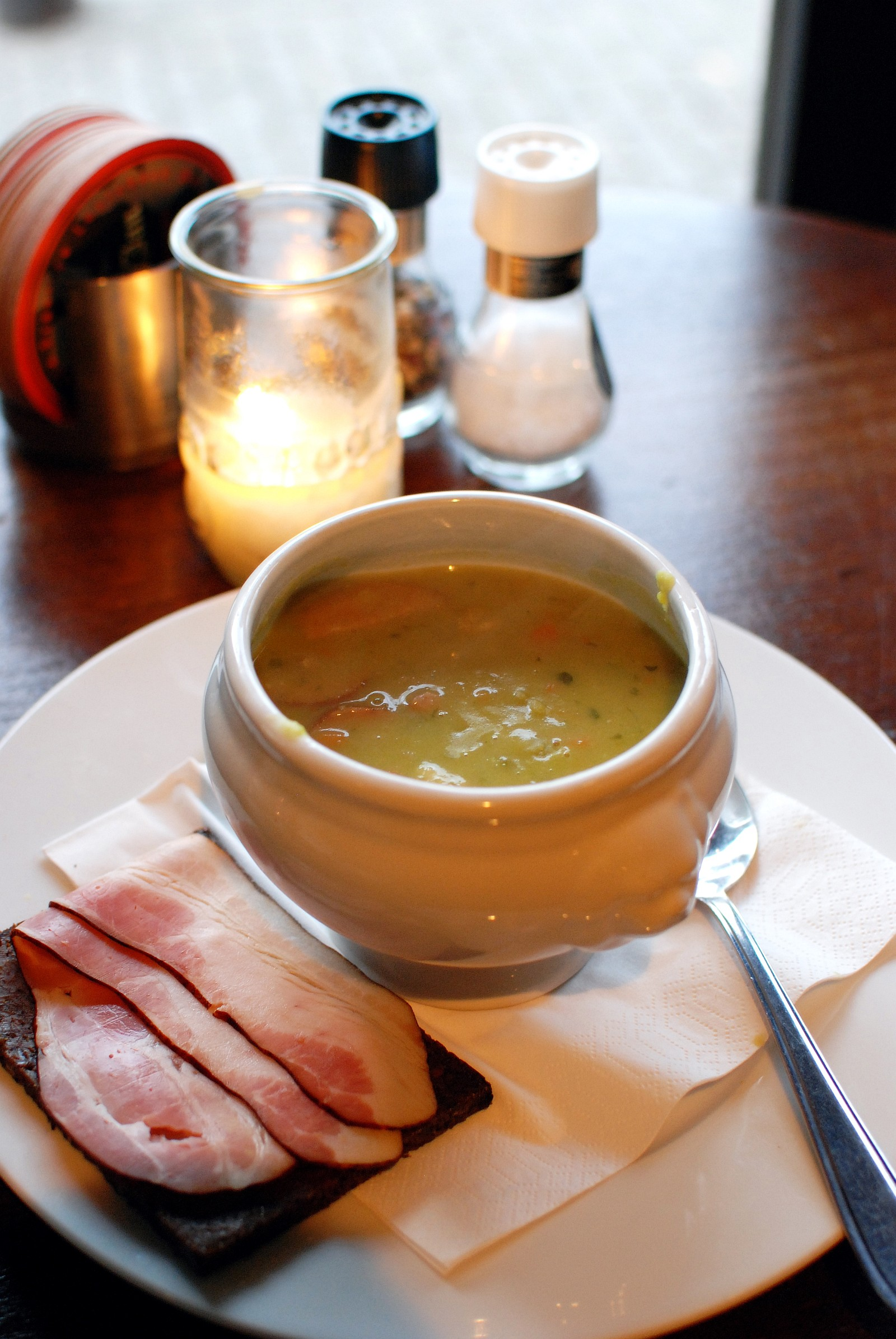
Dutch pea soup served with rye bread and smoked bacon (katenspek)

Erwtensoep (Dutch: [ˈɛrtə(n)sup]), also called snert (Dutch: [snɛrt]), is the Dutch version of pea soup. It is a thick stew of green split peas, different cuts of pork, celeriac or stalk celery, onions, leeks, carrots, and often potato. Slices of rookworst (smoked sausage) are added before serving. The soup, which is traditionally eaten during the winter, is emblematic of Dutch cuisine.

Although erwtensoep and snert are often used interchangeably, a culinary distinction is sometimes made: snert refers more specifically to soup that has been left to stand overnight, allowing it to thicken and its flavours to develop. A traditional rule of thumb holds that snert should be thick enough for a wooden spoon to remain standing upright in the pot. Foodies also distinguishes snert by the addition of pork, bacon and bones, followed by a resting period of at least a day.

It is customarily served with Frisian rye bread (roggebrood) and bacon, cheese or butter. The bacon is usually katenspek, a variety of bacon which has been cooked and then smoked. Pancakes are sometimes served with pea soup; this dish is called snert met struif, struif referring to the pancakes.

In the Royal Dutch Navy the pea soup is completed with small cubes of lard which float as white squares on top. It is therefore referred to as Snert met Drijfijs (pea soup with floating ice).

So-called koek-en-zopie outlets, small food and drinks stalls which spring up only during winters along frozen canals, ponds and lakes in the Netherlands and cater to ice skaters, usually serve snert as a savoury snack.

In Suriname, a former Dutch colony, Dutch-style pea soup is eaten as a street food.

=== Nordic countries ===
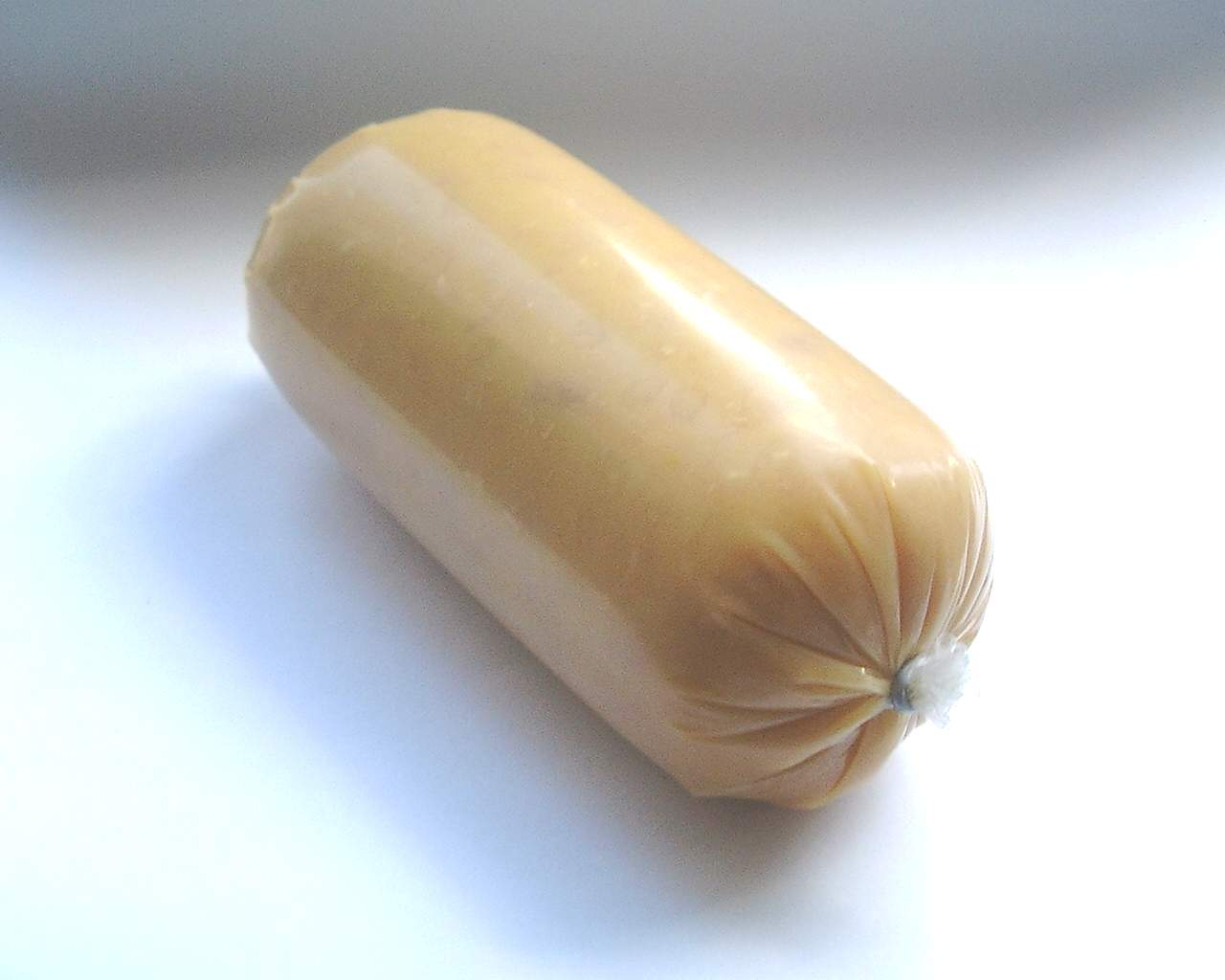
In Sweden, Finland and Denmark, pea soup is sold also in plastic tubes.

Swedish ärtsoppa; Finnish hernekeitto [ˈhernekˌkei̯tːo]; Danish gul ærtesuppe; Norwegian ertesuppe.

Nordic pea soup is normally cooked with pork – although the meat may sometimes be served on the side – and a typical recipe would also include onions and herbs like thyme and marjoram.

In Finland the soup is made of green peas; in Sweden, Norway and Denmark yellow peas are used.

==== Sweden and Finland ====
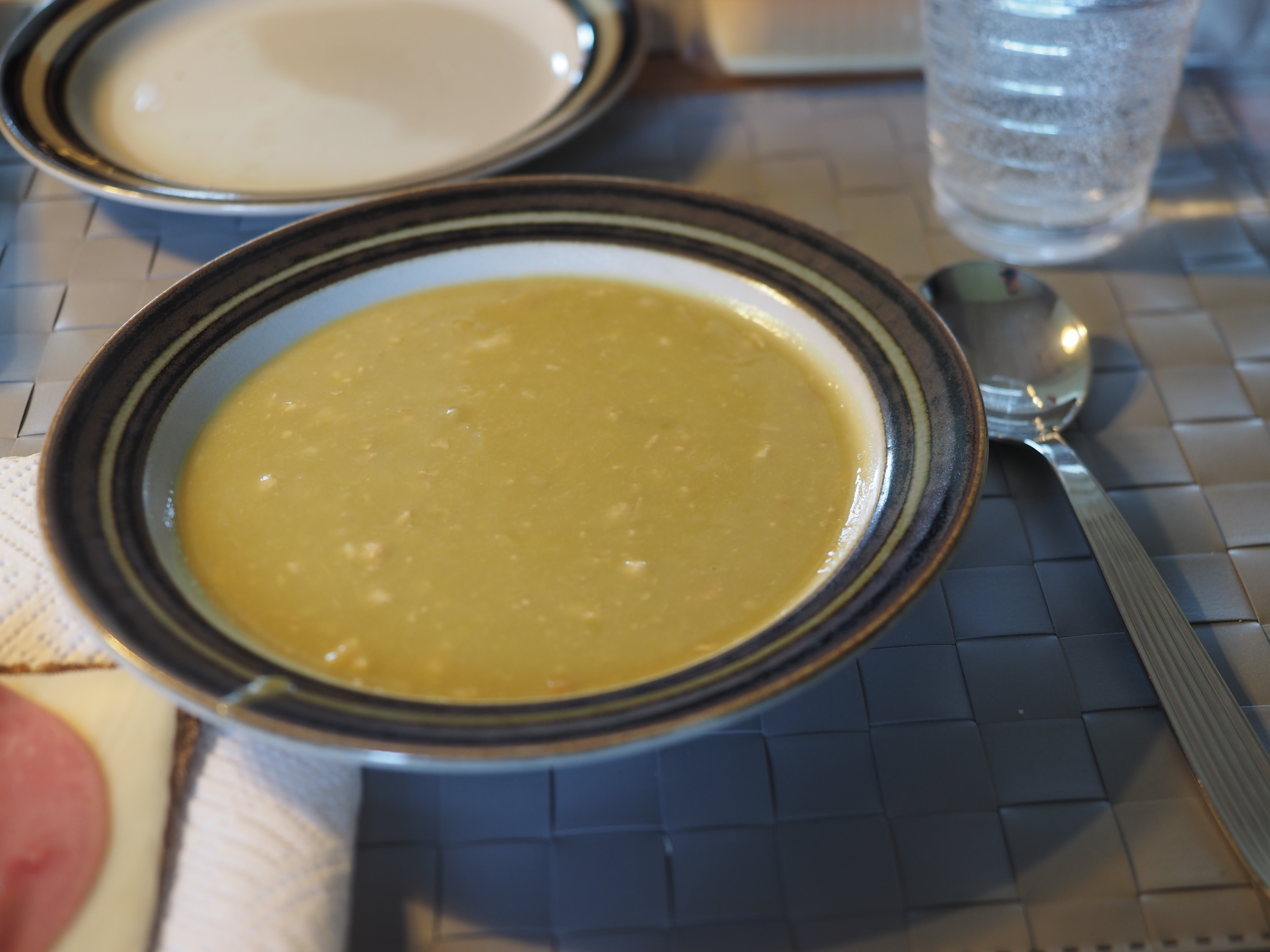
A bowl of Finnish pea soup

In Sweden and Finland the soup is usually served with mustard and chopped onion (not in Sweden), and sometimes also with extra (dried) herbs (thyme or marjoram) to be mixed into the soup at the table. The soup is then normally followed by crêpes-like pancakes with jam (strawberry, raspberry, bilberry, cloudberry or similar) for dessert. In Sweden, the soup is sometimes accompanied by warm punsch as a special treat.

Consumption of pea soup in Sweden and Finland dates back to at least the 13th century, and is traditionally served on Thursdays. This is said to originate in the pre-Reformation era, as preparation for fasting on Fridays. The tradition of Thursday pea soup is common in restaurants, schools, military messes and field kitchens, as well as in homes, and it forms an unpretentious but well-liked part of social life. The pancakes and the punsch are a later tradition.

In Finland, Laskiainen, a winter festival associated with Shrove Tuesday, is generally celebrated by eating green pea soup and either pancakes or a seasonal pastry called laskiaispulla. The celebration often includes downhill sledding.

The Swedish king Eric XIV (1533–1577) is said to have died after eating arsenic-poisoned pea soup. However, it is not proven that the arsenic was added to a pea soup. Pea soup is also known as one of the favorite dishes of Swedish author August Strindberg. He referred to pea soup as gudamat (food for the Gods).

==== Denmark ====
In Denmark, pea soup is served with boiled pork like pork belly and medisterpølse, as well as mustard, pickled beets and rugbrød on the side. In addition, the dish is sometimes turned into a feast, with copious amounts of beer and snaps on festive occasions.

In Denmark the dish can be dated to 1766 in written sources, but might have originated as early as the Bronze Age, when dried peas and cabbage became popular vegetables for the long winters there.

==== Norway ====
In Norway pea soup is traditionally served at springtime and Easter, and is complemented with potatoes, carrots and vegetables.

=== Poland ===
In Poland, pea soup (grochówka [ɡrɔˈxuf.ka]) is typically associated with the military, where it still remains a popular dish. This is because pea soup is nutritious and cheap, and can be easily prepared in large quantities. It is a common saying that military pea soup (grochówka wojskowa) must be thick enough to put a spoon straight up in it. Though the pea soup is normally prepared in messes, the dish is typically associated with field kitchens. Currently, decommissioned field kitchens are often used during mass events.

=== Ukraine ===
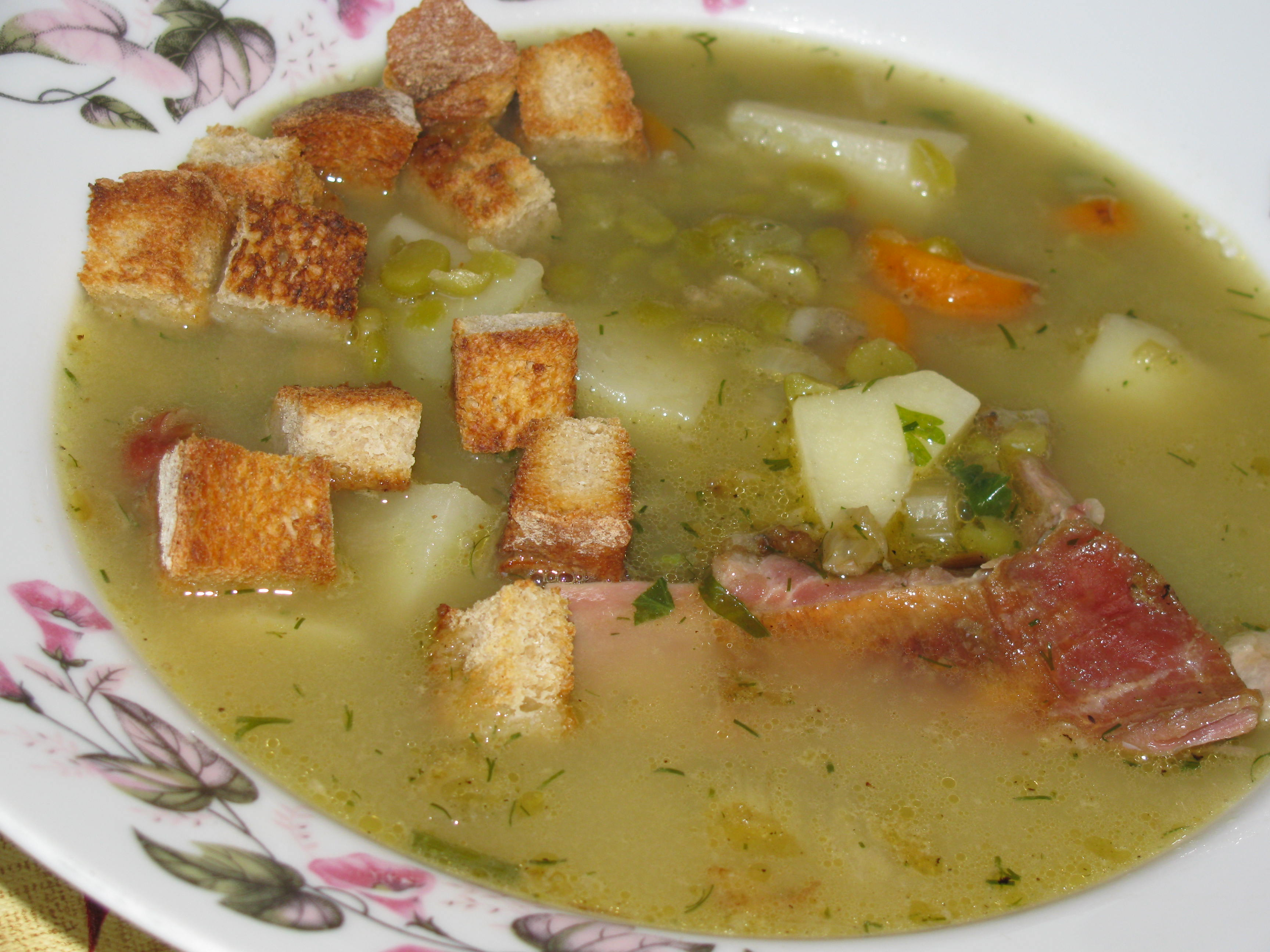
Ukrainian pea soup with croutons

In Ukraine, where it is known as horokhovyi sup or horokhivka, pea soup is a very common everyday dish. It often includes smoked meat or bacon, and is commonly served with croutons.

=== United States ===
In the United States, "pea soup" without qualification usually means a perfectly smooth puree. A recipe for "pea soup" from 1905 is made with split peas, salt pork and cold roast beef. The soup is strained through a sieve to achieve the desired texture.

"Split pea soup" is a slightly thinner soup with visible peas and pieces of ham, especially popular in the Northeast, the Midwest and the Pacific Northwest. It plays a role in the light-hearted tradition of serving green-colored foods on St. Patrick's Day. For example, a 1919 Boston Globe article suggests a suitable menu for "A St. Patrick's Day Dinner" leading off with "Cream of Green Pea Soup (American Style)", and continuing with codfish croquettes with green pea sauce, lettuce salad, pistachio ice cream, and "green decorated cake".

== See also ==
- Dal
- Lentil soup
- List of legume dishes
- List of soups
- List of vegetable soups
- Marrowfat peas
- Pie floater
- Sambar (dish)
