= Erbswurst =

Processed pea-based food product

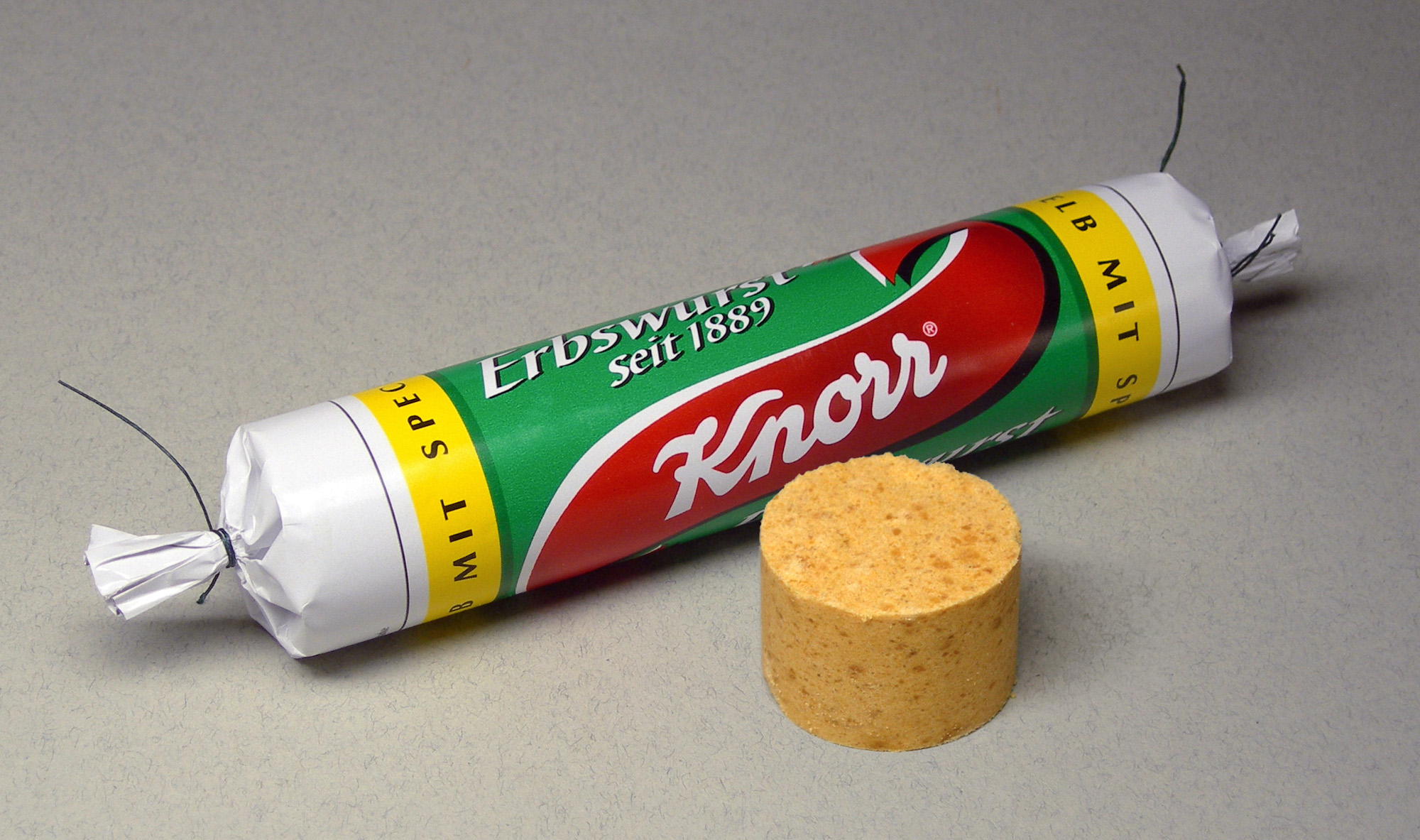
Yellow Knorr brand erbswurst with a single tablet

Erbswurst (lit. 'pea sausage') is one of the oldest industrially produced instant foods. Not a true sausage, erbswurst is a set of pre-portioned tablets packaged in a sausage-shaped, aluminum-coated paper roll. From these, a creamy pea soup could be quickly prepared by crushing the portioned pieces, dissolving them in cold water, and boiling them for a few minutes.

== History ==
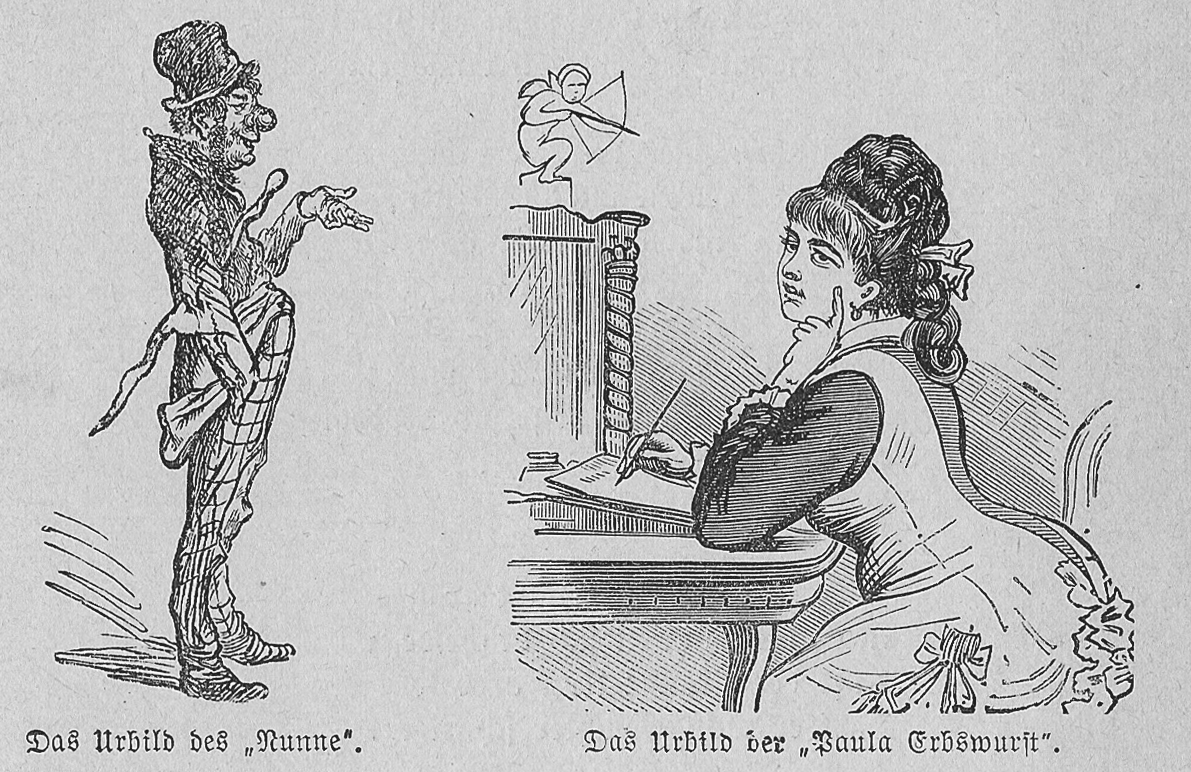
The figure of “Paula Erbswurst” in the satirical magazine Ulk (1896)

Erbswurst was developed in 1867 by the cook and canning manufacturer Johann Heinrich Grüneberg. He soon sold his invention to the Prussian army for 35,000 Vereinstaler. It was promoted by Wilhelm Engelhardt, head of the food department in the Prussian War Ministry, who had it distributed from 1870 onwards during the Franco-Prussian War – initially as an "iron ration". This had been preceded by experiments by the War Ministry in which soldiers on normal service were fed exclusively pea sausage and kommissbrot for six weeks. At the outbreak of the war in 1870, the first production facility, the Royal Prussian Factory for Army Preserves, was built in Berlin at state expense. There, 1,700 workers initially produced seven tons of pea sausage a day; later this rose to up to 65 tons a day and a total of 4,000 to 5,000 employees.

From 1889 onwards, the Knorr brothers of Heilbronn took over the production of the ready-made soup. An advertisement at the time stated: "Knorr's pea sausage without bacon – with bacon – with ham – with pig's ears provides excellent homemade soups." As a cheap, nutritious, almost indefinitely shelf-stable and easy-to-prepare dish, it became universally popular and soon became a basic item for hikers, mountaineers and expeditions. Pea sausage was offered in the varieties "yellow" and "green" until 2018. Production was discontinued on December 31, 2018 due to insufficient demand.

The single-portion pucks originally consisted only of pea flour, beef fat, defatted bacon, table salt, onions, and spices. Later, the composition of the ingredients was significantly changed – in addition to pea flour, smoked bacon, palm oil, table salt, smoked yeast, smoke flavoring, and other flavorings were added. Flavor enhancers were used, including monosodium glutamate, disodium inosinate, disodium guanylate, and yeast extract. The yellow pea sausage also contained turmeric for color, while the green one contained vegetable juice concentrate and spinach powder.
