= Military nutrition =

Food and nutrition in the military

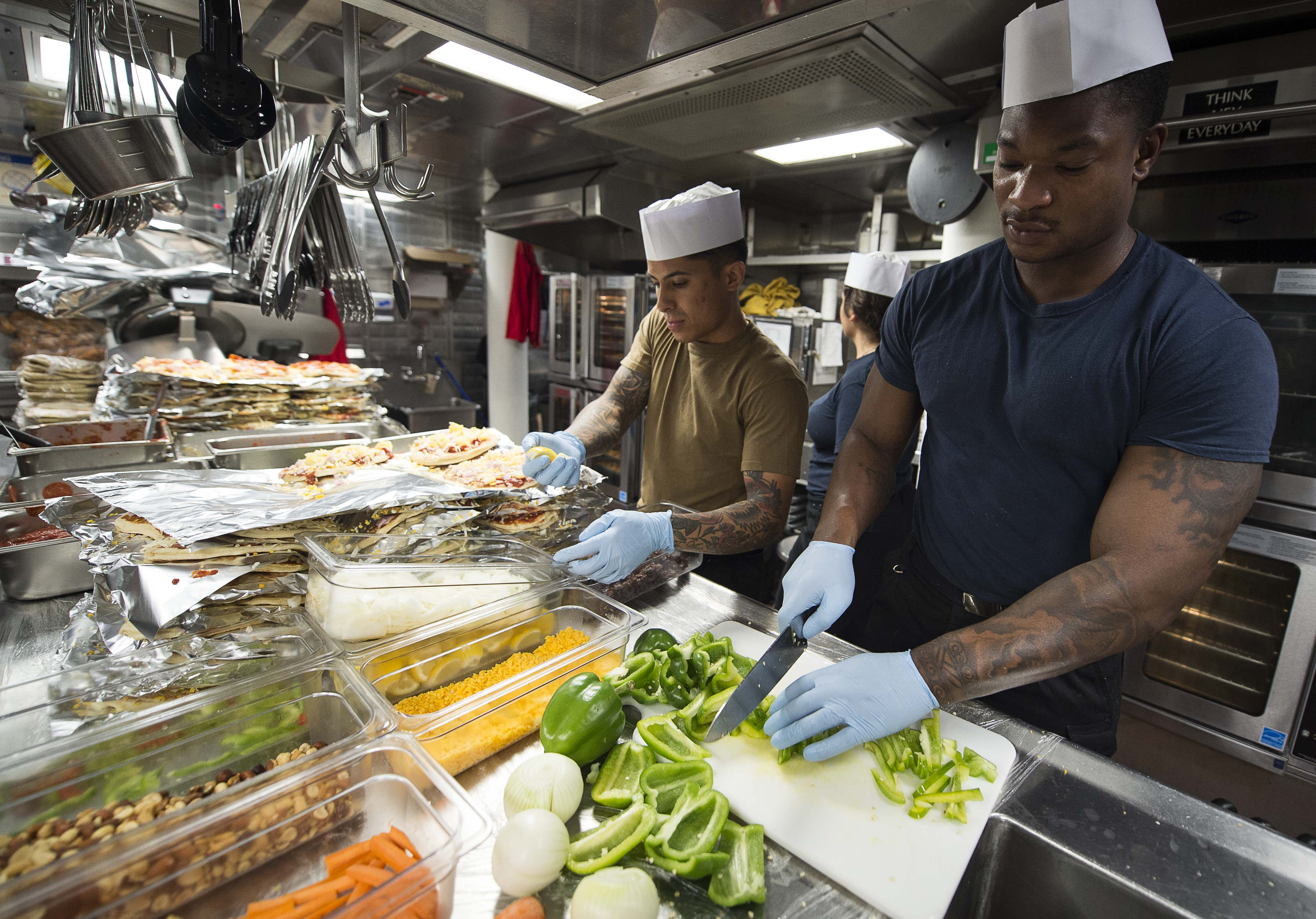
United States Navy culinary specialists preparing food in the galley of the USS Benfold

Military nutrition is the field and study of food, diet, and nutrition in the military. It generally covers and refers to military rations and nutrition in military organizations and environments.

== History ==
In early warfare, militaries generally lived off the land, relying on whatever food they could forage, steal, purchase, or requisition, though these were often rationed to specific amounts for each soldier. Eventually, food began to be issued to soldiers to bring with them on deployment.

For much of history, the food given to soldiers did not account for nutrition, but rather just how well they kept while traveling. Medical ailments such as scurvy and beriberi, as well as general malnutrition and starvation, afflicted militaries for much of history. As food preservation methods improved, so did the variety and quality of military food. In the present, military food and rations are designed to provide personnel with the allotted nutrients and energy they need per day.

== Diet quality ==
A U.S. Marine food service specialist with several Unitized Group Rations

=== United States Armed Forces ===
Throughout the history of U.S. military nutrition, the main issue with military food has not been dietary quality, but rather the lack of food consumption. In the 1990s, the Institute of Medicine Committee on Military Nutrition Research attempted to identify factors that lead to low food intake by troops in field settings, investigating whether or not—and if so, when—the energy deficit affects soldiers’ performance, and what specific factors are involved, allowing the military to implement operational strategies to mitigate the problem.

=== Australian Defence Force ===
A balanced diet informed by sound nutrition knowledge is key for operational readiness and the health of military personnel. Research suggests that military personnel have inadequate dietary intakes. A 2016 study assessed general nutrition knowledge, diet quality and their association in Australian Defence Force personnel. Two specific questions on eating patterns were also included. The first examined how often during an average week (including weekends) participants skipped breakfast, lunch and/or dinner. Response options included 'always', 'often', 'sometimes', or 'never'. The second examined on average how many times per week participants ate dinner away from home – for example, from a restaurant, takeaway, or frontline. Participants were required to provide a numerical value of occasions per week. The study found that military personnel had poor quality diets, even with the knowledge they would expect to have from having to take care of their bodies in order to be able to reach their fitness standards.

=== New Zealand Defence Force ===
A 2013 study of the food given to the Australian and New Zealand Army Corps in the Gallipoli campaign in 1915 analysed their issued military rations using food composition data on the closest equivalents for modern foods. The nutrient analysis suggested that their rations were below modern requirements for vitamins A, C and E; potassium; selenium; and dietary fiber. If military planners had used modest amounts of the canned vegetables and fruit available in 1915, this would probably have eliminated four of these six deficits. These deficits are likely to have caused cases of scurvy and may have contributed to the high rates of other illnesses experienced at Gallipoli. Such problems could have been readily prevented by providing rations that included some canned fruit or vegetables.

=== Canadian Armed Forces ===
In 2017, the Canadian Armed Forces determined that poor nutrition of their military personnel may be affecting their long-term health and combat readiness. Due to their findings, the military designed and required a nutrition course for all new recruits. They also updated their National Standardized Cycle menu and shelf stable rations to encourage healthier eating habits.

=== British Armed Forces ===
During World War I, the rations provided to the British Expeditionary Force were often inedible and did not resemble real food. Rations at the time were high in calories, yet low in essential nutrients. The soldiers mentioning food in many of their letters home shows some psychological distress that they may have been experiencing due to the nature of their rations. In some diaries, soldiers admitted to stealing food from French farms and orchards. Edible food was used as a motivating source for the soldiers when receiving care packages from loved ones.

== Special dietary concerns ==
=== Vegetarianism and veganism ===
Vegetarianism and veganism are usually considered for military foods, though their options are often few compared to non-vegetarian options. For example, as of September 2022, the U.S. military's MRE only had four vegetarian menus and no vegan menus, though the 2023 National Defense Authorization Act, passed in July 2022, was noted to have included an amendment requiring the Defense Logistics Agency to investigate the possibility of creating MREs with plant-based foods. In some militaries, such as the Armed Forces of Ukraine, all rations contain meat or animal products, with vegetarian and vegan rations only provided to soldiers by volunteers and not the military proper. However, in others, such as the Israel Defense Forces—in which approximately 1 in 18 soldiers identifies as vegetarian—plant-based and meat-free rations have been issued since 2017.

In some militaries, the adoption of plant-based meals may not be for dietary reasons, but out of other concerns. In 2018, the Finnish Defence Forces announced they would begin serving at least two meat-free meals per week due to concerns surrounding the environmental impacts of animal agriculture. Similarly, in 2022, the U.S. Navy announced they would begin offering plant-based protein options due to rising costs of meat.

=== Religious diets ===
Military nutrition must often account for religious diets and laws such as kashrut and halal, with alternatives to prohibited food necessary for religious personnel. For example, attempts to accommodate for Hindu and Muslim soldiers in the British military date back to World War I, with dedicated cooks, facilities, and rations issued for soldiers of different faiths. In the 21st century, the British, American, Canadian, and Australian militaries, among others, are known to accommodate for religious diets.

Muslim soldiers must observe Ramadan, a four-week fasting period where the participants can only eat after sundown. This can cause problems for military personnel who are in training or in battle, depleting their body of nutrients for long periods of time while they are still required to do continuous physical and mental labor at a high level of ability. However, a Hellenic Army Academy study found that Ramadan fasting does not affect overall military fitness performance, although fasting cadets were less able to handle repeated maximal exercise, possibly due to inadequate recovery between tests.

== Effects on health ==
Nutrition contributes directly to human health, and health directly contributes to the effectiveness of military personnel. Lack of proper nutrition can decrease the effectiveness of vaccines and increase the possibility of disease, especially in high stress situations. Many nutrients have direct effects on the immune system. When the body is subjected to illnesses such as injuries or burns increased amounts of the amino acid glutamine are required. Vitamins C and E are antioxidants and have been associated with increased immune response.

Nutrition plays an important role in the body's ability to repair itself. Throughout history there have been instances where disease caused by nutritional depletion caused more deaths than combat. During George Anson's 1774 voyage around the world 636 of his 961 soldiers died while on his ships. The surgeon James Lind of the Royal Navy discovered that consuming citrus fruits prevented scurvy. Historical accounts and nutrient analysis provide evidence that poor nutrition and inadequate amounts of vitamins A, C, and E may have caused the failure of the New Zealand Army during the Battle of Gallipoli. These deficiencies account for numerous cases of scurvy and illnesses and could have been easily avoided by incorporating canned fruits and vegetables into soldier’s diets. Inadequate nutrition can result in poor physical and cognitive performance (e.g. inability to carry out physical tasks, poor concentration and decreased vigilance). The long-term effects of both macro- and micro-nutrient imbalances include increased risk of vitamin and mineral deficiencies (potentially predisposing some individuals to an increased risk of stress fractures and rickets), obesity, hypertension, coronary heart disease, diabetes, osteoporosis and kidney failure.

== Psychological effects ==
The subject of how nutrition in the military affects service members psychologically is an ongoing research process. It is currently a small field, as few studies have been conducted. However, much research has been done on how food, or lack thereof, can affect the mental stability of an individual. This information can thus be carried over to our soldiers and intensified, to better their health. A review by the American Dietetic Association indicated that restricting the intake of food has many underlying issues. Lack of proper nutrition can increase emotional responsiveness and dysphoria, and distractibility.

== See also ==
- Field ration
- Garrison ration
- Military rations
- Ninja diet
