= Robert Mwanga =

Ugandan food scientist (born 1954)

- Born: Robert Mwanga; 24 May 1954 (age 72); Kamuli District, Uganda
- Citizenship: Uganda
- Education: Makerere University (BSc); University of the Philippines Los Banos (MS), North Carolina State University (PhD)
- Known for: Introduction of orange-fleshed sweet potato into East Africa
- Awards: 2016 World Food Prize
- Scientific career
- Fields: Plant breeding
- Workplaces: International Potato Center; Namulonge Agricultural and Animal Production Research Institute, Uganda

Robert Mwanga (born 24, May, 1954) is a plant breeder from Uganda. In 2016 he was one of four recipients of the World Food Prize for his work on biofortification of crops, specifically the development of the orange-fleshed sweet potato (OFSP), which is rich in vitamin A.

== Early life ==
Mwanga was born in 1954 to Abuneri Mwanga an evangelist in the Seventh-day Adventist Church and Joyce Nsoli, a farmer in Budhabangula village in Uganda. He and his ten siblings were raised on a farm near Busota in Kamuli District in the Eastern Region of the country, where his family grew coffee and cotton as well as food crops, such as sweet potato, maize, groundnuts, beans, and various fruits and vegetables.

== Education ==
Mwanga went to the Seventh-day Adventist Bugema Primary School until 1968, then attending Jinja College on a Muljibhai Madhavani Company scholarship. He later went to Namilyango College on a government scholarship to study biology, chemistry, geography, fine art and sub-mathematics which he completed in 1974. He obtained a government scholarship to attend Makerere University in Kampala to study botany, zoology, and geography. He then went to the University of the Philippines Los Banos, which specialises in agriculture, where he earned a master's degree in 1986. A decade later he went to North Carolina State University (NCSU) in the US, to study plant breeding and genetics, with financial support from the McKnight Foundation Collaborative Crop Research Program, obtaining a PhD in 2001. One of the main objectives of his research at NCSU was to breed for increased B-Carotene in sweet potatoes.

== Career ==
Graduating from Makerere University with honours in 1978, he joined the National Agricultural Research Laboratory at Kawanda, as a root-crop breeder and also part timing as a Biology teacher at Bugema Secondary School. However, this was a period of civil unrest during the rule of Idi Amin, and the laboratory's facilities had been decimated by funding cuts. Mwanga left Uganda in 1983 to work at the International Institute of Tropical Agriculture (IITA) in Ibadan, Nigeria.

Between 1986 and 1990, Mwanga established the roots and tubers program at the Namulonge Agricultural and Animal Production Research Institute in Uganda, with support from USAID. The program would go on to attract sweet potato breeders from ten sub-Saharan African countries who visited Uganda to improve their breeding skills. After obtaining his PhD, he returned to Uganda and continued his work, with further support from the McKnight Foundation. Additional funding was later provided by the Bill & Melinda Gates Foundation. In 2008, Mwanga became the International Potato Center's lead OFSP breeder for East Africa.

== Achievements ==
More than 40% of pre-school children and 10% of pregnant women in sub-Saharan Africa do not get sufficient vitamin A. A serious deficiency can lead to blindness and increase the likelihood of a child dying from common illnesses, such as diarrhoea and measles. According to Mwanga, an average of 51 children under six die every day in Uganda because of vitamin A deficiency. It would be almost impossible to deliver vitamin A capsules to all families in Africa but making it available through a food staple could address the problem.

Mwanga was the driving force behind making sweet potato research a priority in Uganda, resulting in the white sweet potato largely being replaced by the vitamin A-rich OFSP in rural diets. Between 1995 and 2013, his program released 20 OFSP varieties bred from local varieties and varieties sourced from the US, Asia, and international agencies. He recognized that it was not sufficient just to breed new varieties with a higher vitamin A content. These had to be accepted by the people, who generally preferred the taste of the traditional white or yellow sweet potato varieties. He therefore worked to breed a less-sweet OFSP that would appeal to consumers. It was important to persuade farmers and other consumers of both the nutritional benefits of growing OFSP and the economic benefits. To achieve the latter, he was able to combine increased yields with virus tolerance and blight resistance in the plants, leading to increased adoption by farmers.

By 2014, more than 30 percent of the farmers in Uganda were growing the OFSP varieties that Mwanga had developed. He and other researchers organized groups of farmers to sell cuttings to other small-scale farmers and public education campaigns were used to promote the OFSP, using t-shirts, billboards, and bright orange trucks. Food processors were encouraged to develop foods such as orange sweet potato chips and vacuum-packed sweet potato purée. Over 600,000 botanical sweet potato seeds (breeding populations) have also been distributed to sub-Saharan Africa countries from Mwanga's program.

== Awards ==
Mwanga was awarded the 2016 World Food Prize, together with Maria Andrade, who did similar work in Mozambique, Jan Low from the International Potato Center's Nairobi office, and Howarth Bouis of the International Food Policy Research Institute who carried out work on biofortification.

== Publications ==
Mwanga has authored or co-authored over 200 technical publications, which had been cited close to 6000 times by March 2025.

== Personal life ==
Mwanga is married to Rose Makumbi having two sons together.

== See also ==
- World Food Prize
- Maria Andrade
- Jan Low
- Howarth Bouis
