= Modadugu Vijay Gupta =

Indian biologist

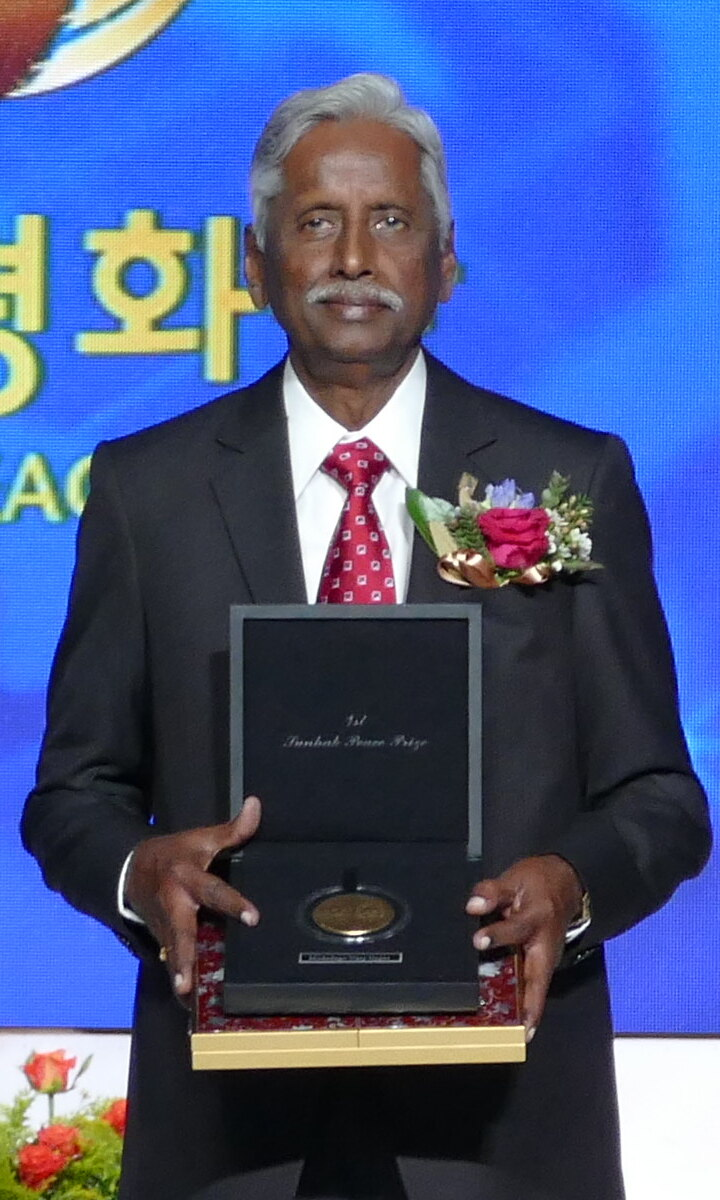
- Born: 17 August 1939 (age 87); Bapatla, Madras Presidency, British India (now in Andhra Pradesh, India)
- Education: University of Calcutta (PhD)
- Occupation: Biologist
- Awards: Padma Shri

Dr. Modadugu Vijay Gupta (17 August 1939) is an Indian biologist and fisheries scientist. He was awarded the World Food Prize in 2005, for development and dissemination of low-cost techniques for freshwater fish farming (using tilapia species) by the rural poor. He is considered a pioneer in the blue revolution of Southeast Asia. In 2015, was selected for the first Sunhak Peace Prize, in recognition of his creating an aquaculture system for the poor, rural populations in Asia, Africa and the Pacific.

In 2023, he was awarded Padma Shri by the Government of India.

== Early life and career ==
Born on 17 August 1939, Modadugu hails from Bapatla in the State of Andhra Pradesh, India.

Till his recent retirement, Dr. Modadugu served as the Assistant Director General at WorldFish, an international fisheries research institute under the Consultative Group on International Agricultural Research (CGIAR) based at Penang in Malaysia.

Honorary titles
Preceded by Yuan Longping	World Food Prize; 2005	Succeeded by Lobato, Paolinelli, and McClung
