= Philip E. Nelson =

American food scientist (born 1934)

Philip E. Nelson (born 1934) is an American food scientist who is best known for his work in bulk aseptic processing and packaging of food and the use of chlorine dioxide gas and hydrogen peroxide liquid to commercially sterilize food products and food contact surfaces. He was the Scholle Chair and Professor in Food Processing at the Department of Food Science at Purdue University. Aseptic processing and packaging would be involved in the relief efforts following the 2004 Indian Ocean earthquake and Hurricane Katrina in 2005.

He received the World Food Prize in 2007 for his work on aseptic food storage.

Nelson was president of the Institute of Food Technologists (IFT) for 2001–02. He has earned four awards from IFT for his efforts: the Food Technology Industrial Achievement Award in 1976, a fellow in 1980, the Nicholas Appert Award in 1995, and the Carl R. Fellers Award in 2005.

In his early life, Nelson worked at his family's tomato cannery on their farm near Morristown, Indiana, developing an interest in horticulture. This led him to a 4-H award when he was 15 at the Indiana State Fair, earning him lunch with the Indiana governor, a gold watch, and a drive around the Indianapolis Motor Speedway. Nelson would return to his family farm as a canning plant manager of his family farm in the late 1950s. After the plant closed in 1960, he returned to Purdue and earned his PhD on flavor volatility in canned tomatoes.

Nelson retired from teaching at Purdue in 2010. The Food Science Building at Purdue which he helped design that opened in 1998 was renamed in his honor as the Philip E. Nelson Hall of Food Science.

Honorary titles
Preceded by Lobato, Paolinelli, and McClung	World Food Prize; 2007	Succeeded by Dole and McGovern
