= Pamela Anderson (disambiguation) =

Pamela Anderson (born 1967) is a Canadian-American actress and model.

Pamela Anderson may also refer to:

- Pamela Anderson (politician) (born 1950), American politician from North Dakota
- Pamela K. Anderson, director of the International Potato Center (Centro Internacional de la Papa)
- Pamela Sue Anderson (1955–2017), American philosopher
- Pamela Andersson (born 1965), Swedish journalist

== See also ==
- Pernella Anderson (1903–1980), African American interviewer for the Federal Writers' Project
