= Jan Low =

American food scientist

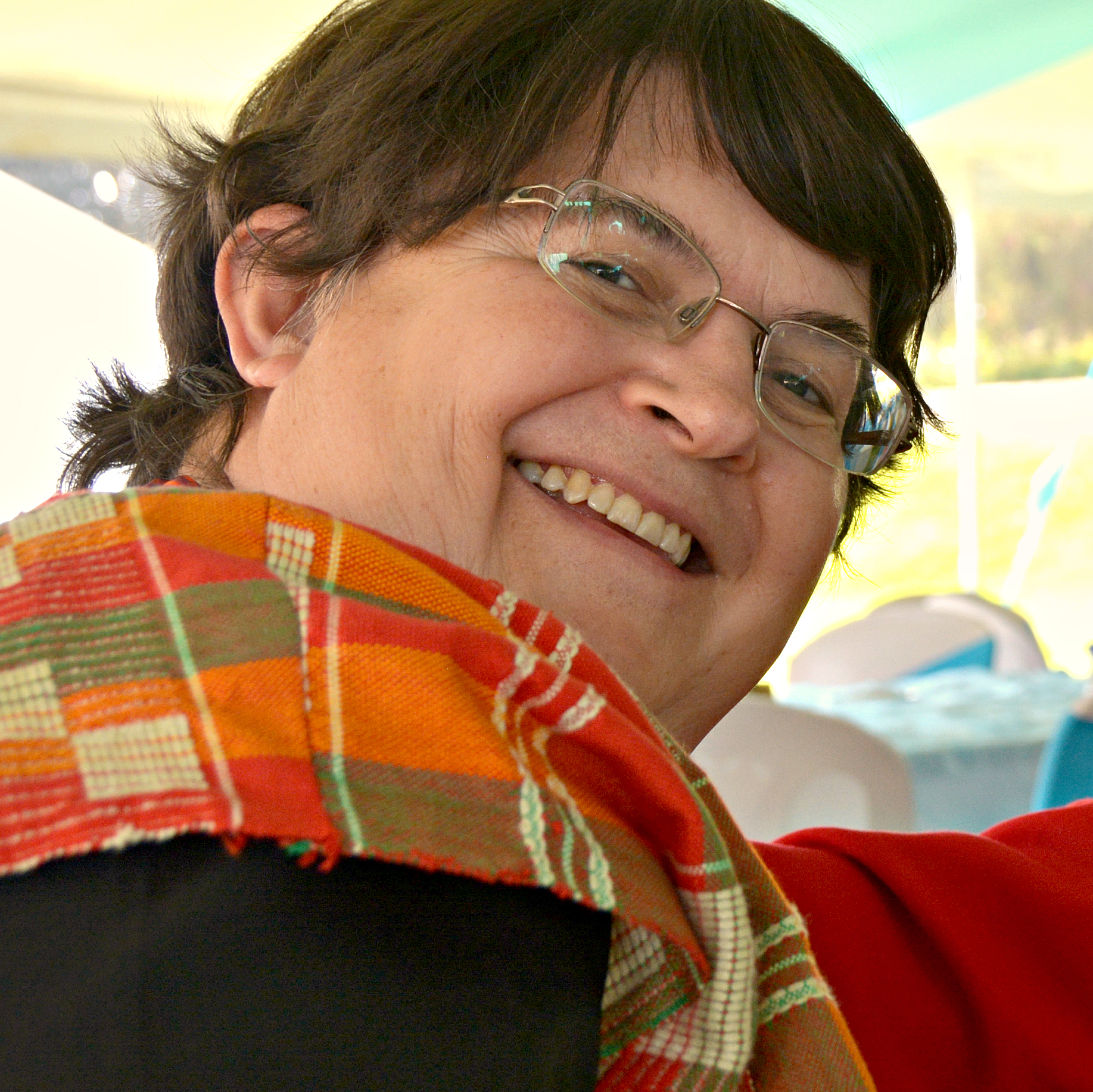
Low in 2016

Jan Low (born 1955) is an American food scientist. She is known for her work helping develop the biofortified orange-fleshed sweet potato at the CGIAR International Potato Center, for which she was a co-recipient of the 2016 World Food Prize alongside Maria Andrade, Robert Mwanga, and Howarth Bouis.

== Early life and education ==
Low was born in 1955 in Denver, Colorado. She attended Pomona College and spent four years in Zaire with the Peace Corps before earning a doctorate in agricultural economics at Cornell University in 1994.

== Career ==
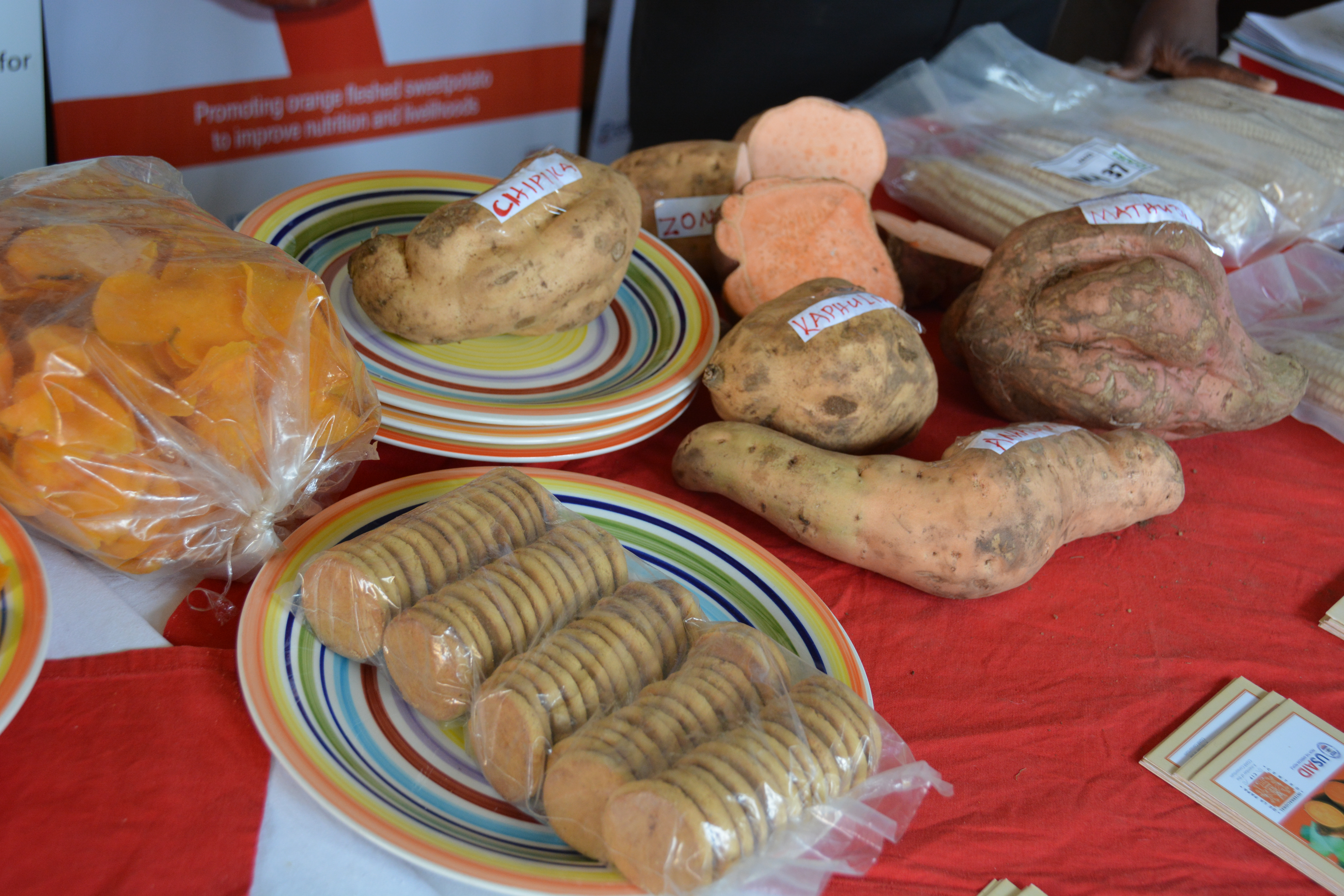
Orange-fleshed sweet potatoes

After Cornell, Low began working at the Nairobi office of the CGIAR International Potato Center, a research center based in Lima, Peru. She helped develop the biofortified orange-fleshed sweet potato, which contains more vitamin A than the dominant variant, and can therefore be used to help alleviate the vitamin A deficiency common among children in the region.

== Recognition ==
- Low was awarded the 2016 World Food Prize, together with Maria Andrade, who did similar work in Mozambique, Robert Mwanga from Uganda, and Howarth Bouis of the International Food Policy Research Institute who carried out work on biofortification.
