= Sorghum production in Sudan =

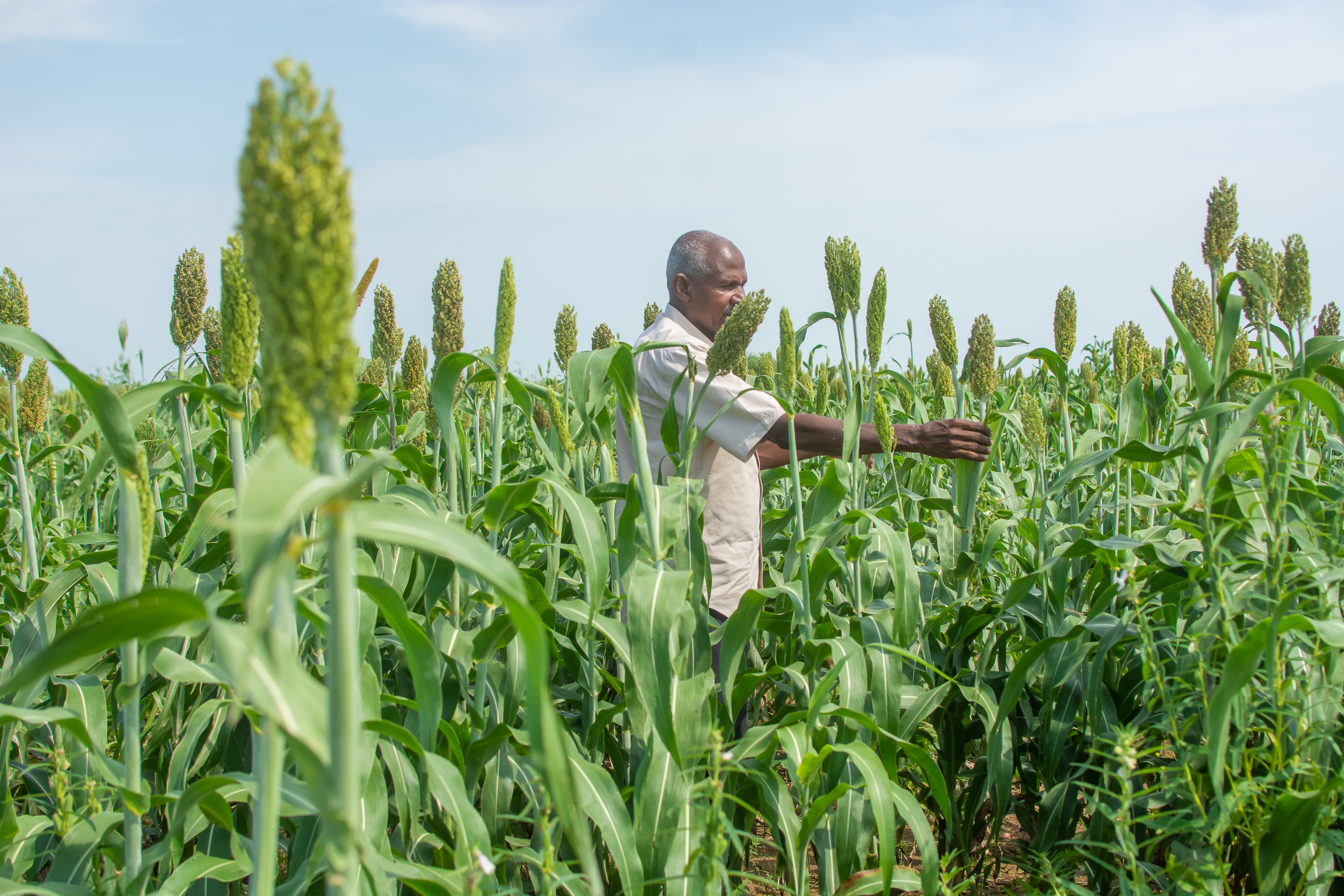
Sorghum field in White Nile State, Sudan.

Sorghum production in Sudan is a major segment of the national economy, with the crop being the most harvested crop in the country. Sorghum was initially domesticated in or near the country, with the crop becoming the dominant local staple over wheat and barley by the medieval period. Sudan's production of sorghum is one of the highest in Africa and the world.

== History ==
Sorghum was first domesticated in the territory of present-day Sudan or neighboring Ethiopia sometime between 4,000 to 3,000 BC, and from the area spread to the Sahel region, East Africa, and beyond the continent. The local Neolithic inhabitants likely domesticated the crop independently of the domestication of other cereal crops in the Near East.

During the time of the Kingdom of Kush, which covered much of present-day northern Sudan, sorghum was extensively cultivated and is present in drawings from the period. The saqiyah waterwheel was introduced from Persia in this period, allowing for double cropping. During the medieval period, sorghum cultivation became more dominant in present-day Sudan, while other grains such as wheat and barley declined in importance.

In 1983, a drought-resistant hybrid sorghum developed by Gebisa Ejeta was introduced to Sudan, which resulted in the development of a local commercial sorghum seed industry. The variety, known as Hageen Dura-1, had spread to over 1 million acres across Sudan by 1999. In 2024, with the ongoing Sudanese Civil War disrupting agricultural production in key producing areas such as the White Nile State and the Gezira State, the Sudanese agriculture minister issued a mandate to allocate 10 percent of land irrigated by modern irrigation companies to sorghum production.

== Production ==
According to data by the United States Department of Agriculture and the International Food Policy Research Institute, Sudan produced 3 million tonnes of sorghum in the 2025/2026 year, compared to the 10-year average of 4.26 million tonnes from 2016 to 2026. This made sorghum by far the most harvested crop in the country, ahead of other crops such as peanuts and millet. This also made the country the world's eighth-highest producer and Africa's third-highest behind Nigeria and Ethiopia. The World Bank placed sorghum second (behind dairy products) among agricultural products in terms of monetary value, noting that sorghum was the "single largest contributor to the nutrition requirements of an average Sudanese" and that "a vast majority of farmers" were involved in its production.

== Usage ==
Kisra, a bread prepared from fermented sorghum flour, is the main staple of Sudanese cuisine. Other products in Sudanese cuisine mainly made from sorghum include asida (a sorghum porridge) and abreh (a non-alcoholic sorghum beverage).

To conserve domestic supplies, the Sudanese government has from time to time banned the export of the grain.
