= Howarth Bouis =

American economist

Academic background
- Education: Stanford University

Academic work
- Institutions: HarvestPlus; International Food Policy Research Institute
- Awards: World Food Prize

Howarth E. "Howdy" Bouis (born October 10, 1950), is an American economist whose work has focused on agriculture, nutrition outcomes, and reducing micronutrient malnutrition, also known as hidden hunger. He is the founder and former director of HarvestPlus, a global non-profit agricultural research program. Bouis was awarded the World Food Prize in 2016 for his pioneering work on biofortification.

== Early life and education ==
Bouis was born in 1950 in Berkeley, California. He received his BA in economics from Stanford University in 1972. Bouis then spent three years in the Philippines serving with Volunteers in Asia, an experience that influenced him to pursue a career in international humanitarian work. Bouis went on to receive his MA and PhD from the Food Research Institute at Stanford University. As part of his doctoral research, he spent a year as a fellow at the International Rice Research Institute in Los Baños, the Philippines, collecting information for his dissertation, “Rice Policy in the Philippines”.

== Career ==
=== International Food Policy Research Institute ===
In 1982, Bouis joined the International Food Policy Research Institute (IFPRI) as a post-doctoral researcher in the Food Consumption and Nutrition Division. The first project he undertook at IFPRI investigated how economic factors impact nutritional status and health outcomes in the Philippines. He went on to work in the same division as a Research Fellow and Senior Research Fellow.

=== Discovery and confirmation of biofortification ===
When Bouis joined IFPRI, most experts in the field considered calorie intake to be the principal benchmark for nutritional status. The issue of micronutrient malnutrition, or hidden hunger, was not yet widely understood. Research that Bouis and Lawrence Haddad carried out in the Philippines from 1984 to 1990 indicated that mineral and vitamin intake, not calorie intake, was the primary constraint to improving nutrition outcomes and reducing micronutrient deficiencies. Recognizing that low-income smallholder farmers, a large proportion of the population in most developing countries, could not afford nutritionally-dense, diverse diets, Bouis sought a way for staple crops, such as beans, rice, and wheat, to provide more micronutrients. He hypothesized that crops bred to include higher levels of iron, zinc or vitamin A could substantially improve nutrition at a relatively low cost and could conveniently reach remote rural households. This concept eventually came to be known as biofortification.

=== HarvestPlus ===
After receiving initial skepticism from the public health and agricultural communities, Bouis partnered with Dr. Ross Welch from the United States Department of Agriculture’s Plant, Soil, and Nutrition Laboratory (PSNL) at Cornell University and Dr. Robin Graham of the University of Adelaide, and IFPRI’s Biofortification Challenge Project was formed in 1993. The Project was renamed HarvestPlus in 2003, and Bouis was selected as Director. In that role, he led the effort to breed and deliver micronutrient-dense staple crops to reduce micronutrient malnutrition. Biofortification now reaches over 25 million people in developing countries. Bouis remained in this role until his retirement in October 2016. He currently resides in the Philippines and continues to serve as an advisor for the program.

== Awards ==
In 2016, Bouis was announced as a recipient of the World Food Prize for pioneering the concept of biofortification and taking it from hypothesis to scaling up globally. The World Food Prize Committee noted that Bouis “persevered relentlessly in the face of skepticism and opposition from public health experts and crop breeders as he pursued his vision that agriculture could provide more nutritious staple crops, which could reduce the micronutrient deficiencies that can cause malnutrition, blindness, disease and even early death among vulnerable populations in Africa and Asia, and Latin America, particularly children under the age of five”. He shared the prize with fellow laureates Dr. Maria Andrade, Dr. Jan Low, and Dr. Robert Mwanga of the International Potato Center in recognition of their pioneering work on biofortified sweet potatoes in Africa.

In 2017, Bouis was awarded an Honorary Doctor of Science from the University of Greenwich.

== Selected publications ==
- Bouis, H. and L. Haddad. 1990. Agricultural commercialization, nutrition, and the rural poor: A study of Philippine farm households. Boulder, Colorado: Lynne Rienner Publishers.
- Bouis, Howarth E.; Haddad, Lawrence J. (1992). "Are estimates of calorie-income fxelasticities too high?". Journal of Development Economics. 39 (2): 333. doi:10.1016/0304-3878(92)90043-9.
- Bouis, Howarth; Haddad, Lawrence; Kennedy, Eileen (1992). "Does it matter how we survey demand for food?". Food Policy. 17 (5): 349. doi:10.1016/0306-9192(92)90063-4.
- Bouis, Howarth E. (1994). "The effect of income on demand for food in poor countries: Are our food consumption databases giving us reliable estimates?". Journal of Development Economics. 44: 199–226. doi:10.1016/0304-3878(94)00012-3.
- Bouis, H. E. (2002). "Plant breeding: A new tool for fighting micronutrient malnutrition". The Journal of Nutrition. 132 (3): 491S–494S. doi:10.1093/jn/132.3.491S. PMID 11880577.
- Bouis, Howarth E. (2007). "Micronutrient fortification of plants through plant breeding: Can it improve nutrition in man at low cost?". Proceedings of the Nutrition Society. 62 (2): 403–11. doi:10.1079/PNS2003262. PMID 14506888.
- Bouis, H. E.; Eozenou, P; Rahman, A (2011). "Food prices, household income, and resource allocation: Socioeconomic perspectives on their effects on dietary quality and nutritional status". Food and Nutrition Bulletin. 32 (1 Suppl): S14–23. doi:10.1177/15648265110321S103. PMID 21717914.

== See also ==
- Biofortification
- Micronutrient deficiency
- World Food Prize
