= Roots of Peace =

Non-profit humanitarian organization

Roots of Peace is a humanitarian organization dedicated to the removal of landmines and the subsequent replanting and rebuilding of war-torn regions. Founded in 1997 by Heidi Kuhn, the goal of Roots of Peace is to turn minefields into farmland and support victims of landmine accidents. The organization is funded by private and public funding, including the California Wine Industry, and is based in San Rafael, California.

On May 1, 2002, Roots of Peace began removing landmines in the Shomali Plain north of Kabul in Afghanistan. In 2003, Roots of Peace began a major replanting campaign targeted at revitalizing Afghanistan’s table grape industry. The organization is also working in other countries such as Cambodia, Croatia and Iraq. It is supported by the United Nations, the United States State Department, and other commercial entities such as Warner Brothers and Palm, Inc.

Roots of Peace received the Skoll Foundation Award for Social Entrepreneur 2006. This award for $765,000 was presented by Jeffrey Skoll, Founder of eBay, Robert Redford, Ben Kingsley and Al Gore at the Said International School of Business in Oxford, England.

Roots of Peace has raised the necessary funds to remove landmines in the Shomali Plains and empowered Afghan farmers to harvest/export over 90,000 metric tons of fresh grapes and raisins to India, Pakistan, Dubai, Ukraine, and Russia. This MINES TO VINES initiative has successfully replaced the scourge of landmines in the Shomali Plains region of Afghanistan with the bountiful nectar of grapes.

On May 11, 2023, Roots of Peace founder Heidi Kuhn was named the 2023 World Food Prize Laureate.
