= Salma Sultana =

Bangladeshi veterinarian

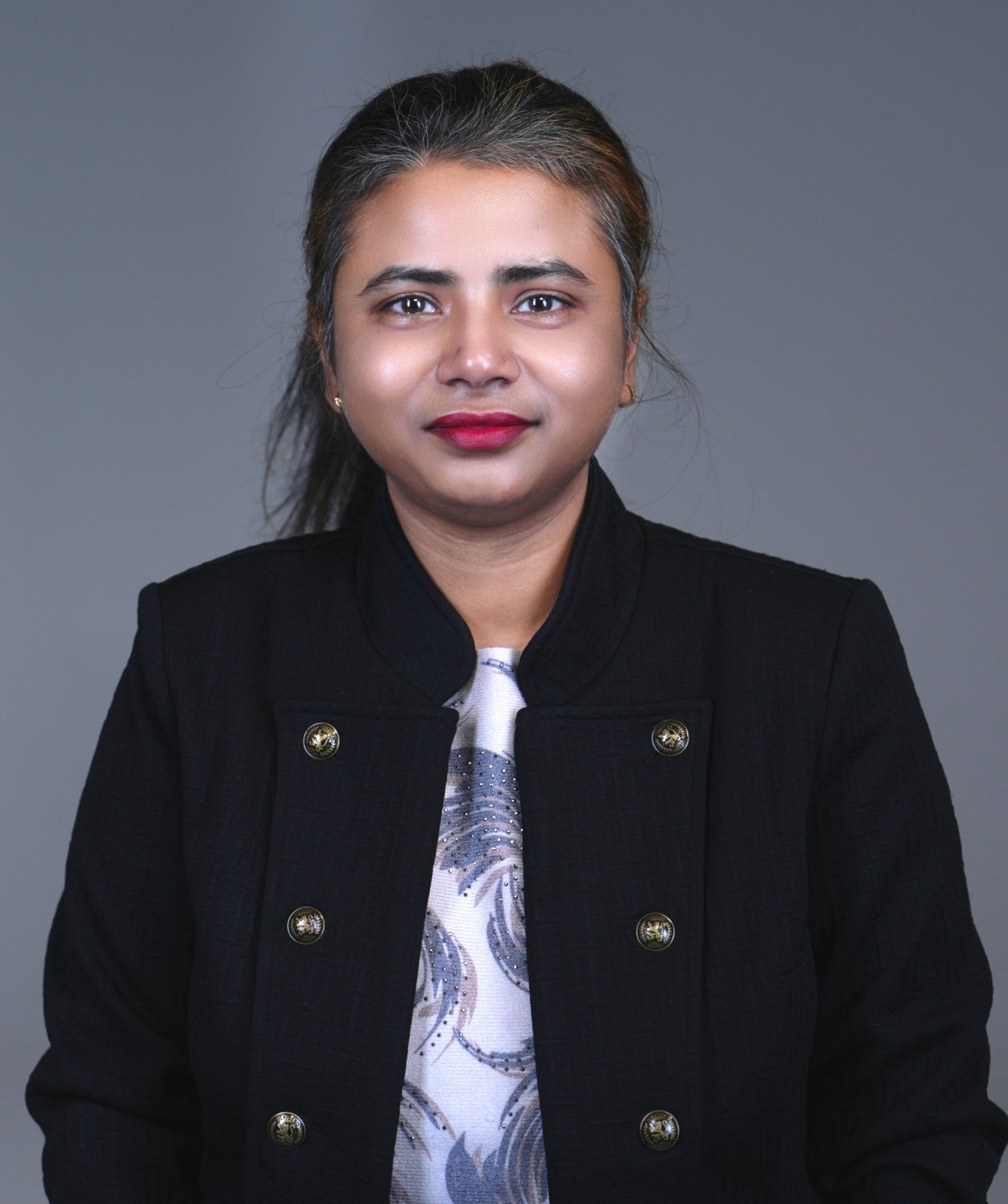
- Dr. Salma Sultana was listed among the top 100 Asian scientists in Asian Scientist magazine in April 2021
- Born: Sirajganj, Bangladesh
- Education: DVM, MS
- Alma mater: Chittagong Veterinary and Animal Sciences University; Tamil Nadu Veterinary and Animal Sciences University; Iowa State University (Phd)
- Occupations: Veterinarian; Entrepreneur and Researcher
- Organization: Founder of Model Livestock Advancement Foundation (MLAF)
- Known for: The first female entrepreneur and development worker in the livestock sector of Bangladesh
- Notable work: Founded country's first non-government Livestock training institution and outdoor veterinary hospital

Salma Sultana is a veterinarian, entrepreneur, and researcher. She is the recipient of the 2020 the Norman Borlaug Award for Field Research and Application. She has also been honored by the World Food Prize Foundation. Sultana received this award for her innovative model of providing veterinary outreach, treatment, and education to thousands of small-scale farmers in Bangladesh.

She is also listed in the Asian Scientist 100 list for her innovation in veterinary treatment, education, and extension services through Model Livestock Advancement Foundation.This list is published by Asian Scientist Magazine.

== Early life and education ==
Sultana was born in Sirajganj. She brought up in different Bangladesh districts due to her father's profession. She is now based in Dhaka, Bangladesh. She graduated with a Doctor of Veterinary Medicine (DVM) from Chittagong Veterinary and Animal Sciences University in 2010 (held in 2012). She got clinical training at Tamil Nadu Veterinary and Animal Sciences University. She got her master's degree in pharmacology from CVASU in 2014. While working on her master's degree, she started researching on antimicrobial activities of medicinal plants and their anthelmintic efficacy. Now, Sultana is a PhD candidate in the Interdepartmental Microbiology Graduate Program at Iowa State University, where her research explores the impact of histotripsy on bacterial infections, immune system responses, and potential approaches to combating antimicrobial resistance (AMR).

== Career ==
After completing graduation, Sultana started her career as a veterinary officer in a community-based veterinary foundation under Bangladesh Agricultural University. While working at the foundation, she realized that there was a significant gap between the availability and the demand for animal healthcare in rural areas. She observed that farmers, whose livelihoods are heavily dependent on their livestock, could not afford proper treatment, and thus they sometimes resorted to untrained doctors or treating the animals on their own. Malpractice of quack doctors, farmer's unawareness, growing AMR, and unemployment, motivated her work for the country in the livestock sector.

In 2014, after she completed her post-graduate education, she created Model Livestock Institute. In the same year, she also started an outdoor veterinary hospital named Model Livestock Institute Veterinary Hospital, which is engaged with various treatments and services for domestic animals, pets, and birds. It has a small laboratory for facilitating evidence-based health services. In 2018, the Hospital developed VetSheba, a call center and online service that farmers can use to speak directly to a doctor or expert consultant and be referred to receive a check-up from a livestock health service provider in their area.

Sultana created an NGO named Model Livestock Advancement Foundation (MLAF) in 2015. It is a nonprofit organization for animal healthcare, technical education, and research-based organization in Bangladesh. This focuses on women empowerment, youth employment, food security and safety, one health approach, antimicrobial resistance control, herd health improvement, and animal welfare. She created two projects during the COVID-19 pandemic situation. One was providing animal feed to the farmers and the other providing fresh farm food (meat, milk, and egg) to the customers which is tested in the lab by the name of “Safe and Green Bazaar”.

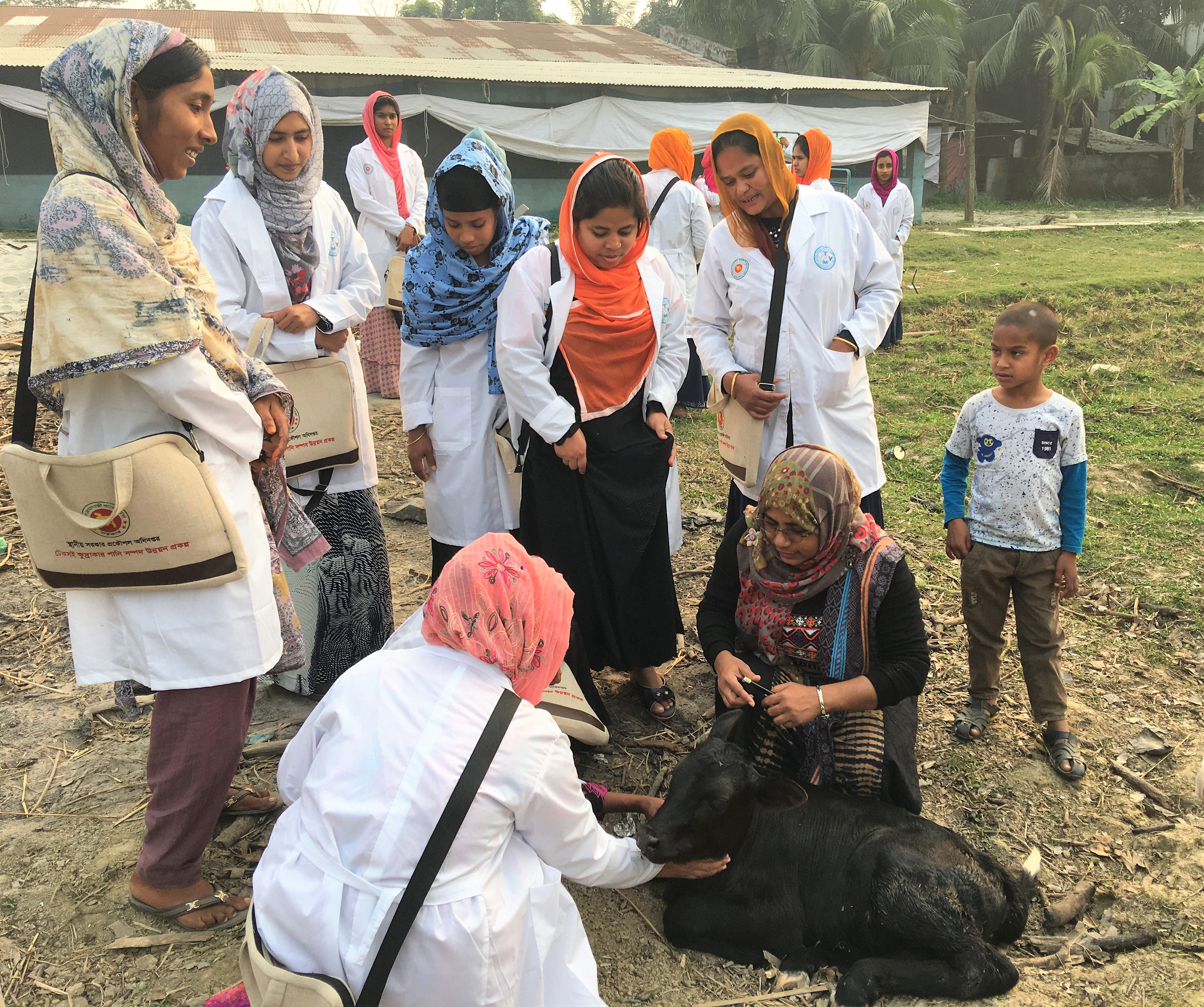
Salma Sultana is providing hands-on training

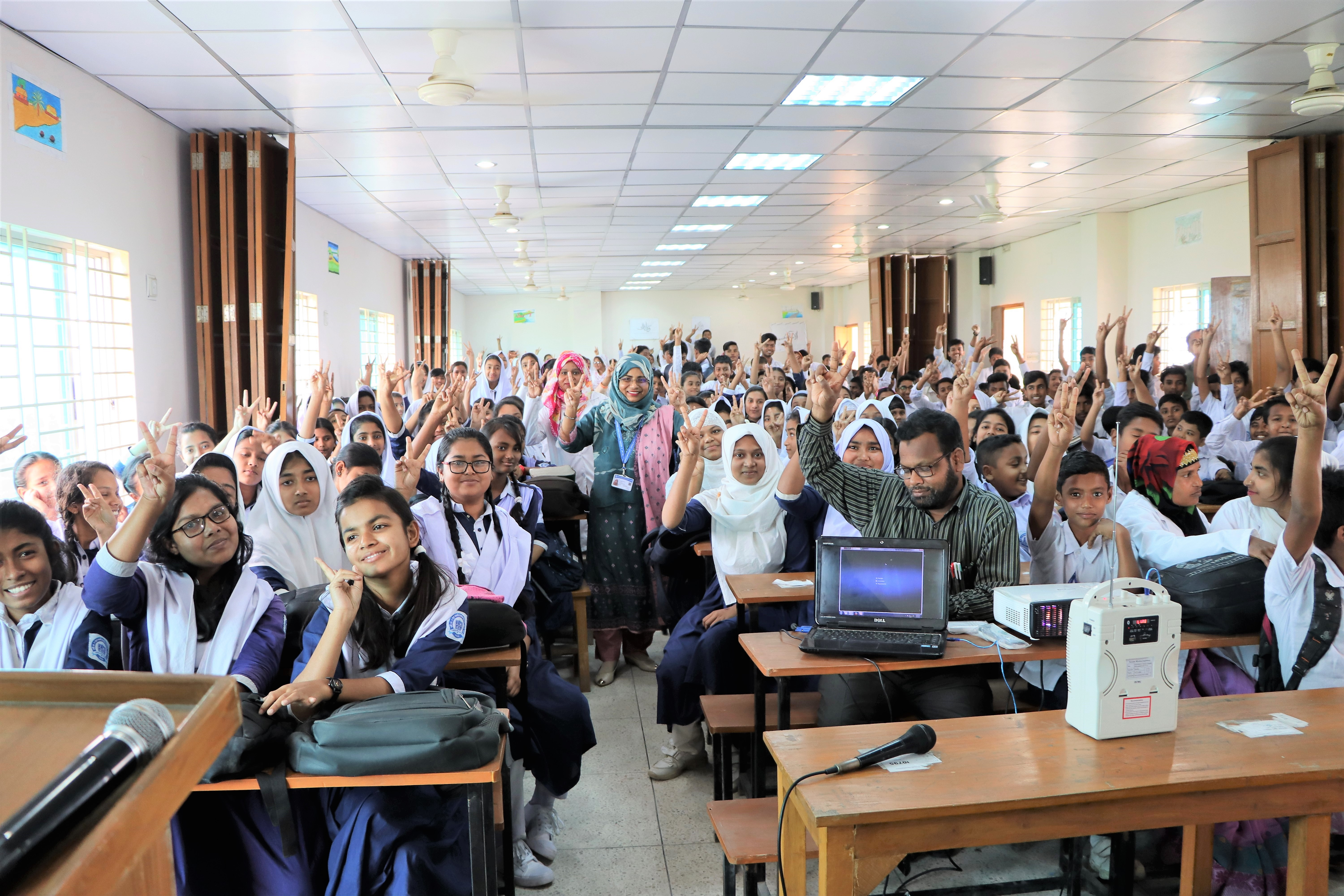
Dr. Salma Sultana disseminating awareness to the school student about One Health

== Awards ==
- Asian Scientist 100
- Norman E. Borlaug Award for Field Research and Application 2020
- Australia Awards-2021-Women in STEM
- Anannya Top Ten Awards
- COVID-19 Fighter International Honors-2020
- International Arch of Europe for Quality and Technology Award 2018
- Young Change Maker Award 2018
- Youth Icon Award 2018
- Joy Bangla Youth Award 2017
- Mother Teresa Award 2017

== Writing ==
Sultana is a professional trainer and an educator. She has written 9 professional books and 5 manuals for her students.

=== Books ===
- Basic Veterinary Anatomy and Physiology
- Easy learning of Veterinary Pathology
- Parasitic Profile
- Basic Concept of Pharmacology
- Rural Livestock Entrepreneurship
- Livestock Business
- Ruminant Animal Production
- Non-ruminant Animal Production

=== Manuals ===
- Poultry Production
- Backyard Farming
- Fodder Cultivation
- Beef Fattening
