= Genetically modified food in Africa =

Genetically modified (GM) crops have been commercially cultivated in four African countries; South Africa, Burkina Faso, Egypt and Sudan. Beginning in 1998, South Africa is the major grower of GM crops, with Burkina Faso and Egypt starting in 2008. Sudan grew GM cotton in 2012. Other countries, with the aid of international governments and foundation, are conducting trials and research on crops important for Africa. Crops under research for use in Africa include cotton, maize, cassava, cowpea, sorgum, potato, banana, sweet potato, sugar cane, coconut, squash and grape. As well as disease, insect and virus resistance some of the research projects focus on traits particularly crucial for Africa like drought resistance and biofortification.

In 2010, after nine years of talks, the Common Market for Eastern and Southern Africa (COMESA) produced a draft policy on GM technology, which was sent to all 19 national governments for consultation in September 2010. Under the proposed policy, new GM crops would be scientifically assessed by COMESA. If the GM crop was deemed safe for the environmental and human health, permission would be granted for the crop to be grown in all 19 member countries, although the final decision would be left to each individual country. Kenya passed laws in 2011, and Ghana and Nigeria passed laws in 2012 which allowed the production and importation of GM crops. By 2013 Cameroon, Malawi and Uganda had approved trials of genetically altered crops. Ethiopia has also revised its biosafety laws and in 2015 was trying to source GM cotton seeds for trials.

A study investigating voluntary labeling in South Africa found that 31% of products labeled GMO-free had a GM content above 1.0%. 2011 studies for Uganda showed that transgenic bananas had a high potential to reduce rural poverty but that urban consumers with a relatively higher income might reject the introduction.

In 2002, Zambia cut off the flow of genetically modified food (mostly maize) from UN's World Food Programme on the basis of the Cartagena Protocol. This left the population without food aid during a famine. In December 2005 the Zambian government changed its position in the face of further famine and allowed the importation of GM maize. However, the Zambian Minister for Agriculture Mundia Sikatana insisted in 2006, that the ban on genetically modified maize remained, saying "We do not want GM (genetically modified) foods and our hope is that all of us can continue to produce non-GM foods."
