= John Ruan (businessman) =

American businessman (1914–2010)

John Ruan (February 11, 1914 – February 14, 2010) was the former chairman and CEO of The Ruan Companies and Chairman Emeritus of the World Food Prize.

At the Ruan Companies, Ruan represented a diversified group of businesses with activities that include transportation, commercial banking, financial services, international trading and real estate development.

== Career ==
In his native Iowa, Ruan was a major contributor in business and the development of the Des Moines metropolitan area. In the early 1970s, Ruan built the 36 story Ruan Center to house the administration of the growing number of Ruan companies. Ruan built the 33-story Marriott Hotel in 1980 and the 14-story Two Ruan Center in 1982. He was active in the development and building of the Des Moines Convention Center in 1985 as well as several parking ramps in the downtown area. Ruan also owned Bankers Trust Company, the largest independent bank in Iowa.

Ruan funded ongoing research at Rush-Presbyterian-St. Lukes MS Clinic in Chicago and also sponsored the Ruan Neuroscience Center at Mercy Medical Center in Des Moines, Iowa.

Ruan began his trucking company in 1932 with only one truck. This small business grew into Ruan Transportation Management Systems, which is now one of the nation's largest trucking operations. Internationally, Ruan founded the Iowa Export-Import Trading Company, a business involving over 50 nations around the world.

He was the subject of a 2003 biography, In for the Long Haul: The Life of John Ruan, by historian William B. Fredericks. Ruan died on February 14, 2010, three days after his 96th birthday. Ruan was survived by his wife, the former Elizabeth Jayne Adams; two sons, John III, and Thomas; his daughter Rachel Ruan McLean; six grandchildren and thirteen great-grandchildren. His daughter, Jayne, died in 1992, at the age of 44.
