= Hubert Zandstra =

Canadian agronomist (1940–2025)

Hubert George Zandstra (October 28, 1940 to December 6, 2025) was a Canadian agronomist. He represented the small producers to international agencies concerned with agriculture.

== Life ==
Zandstra was born at Makassar, Indonesia on October 28, 1940. Pierre Jacque Zandstra was his father and Frieda Wijtman his mother.

Due to the Japanese occupation of the Dutch East Indies during World War II, his family suffered internment. After the war he went to the Netherlands, and then immigrated to Canada. Studying agronomy at McGill University, he earned Bachelor of Science and master of science degrees. He obtained his Ph.D. at Cornell University in 1971 for his work in soil chemistry.

As an agronomist for the International Development Research Centre (Canada), he worked from 1971 to 75 on a project for Cáqueza, Colombia. He worked in the Philippines at the International Rice Research Institute. Thereafter, he went to Lima, Peru as director of the International Potato Center from 1991 to 2005. He endured a traumatic experience as a hostage in 1996 due to a Shining Path insurgency.

== Works ==
- 1968: "Use of plant analyses for determination of phosphorus requirements for wheat on summerfallow land" @ University of Saskatchewan
- 1968: "Automated determination of phosphorus content in sodium bicarbonate extracts", Canadian Journal of Soil Science 48(2)
- 1969: (with R. H. Anderson & W. K. Dawley) "Effects of fertilizer on yield and quality of Norland potatoes in northeastern Saskatchewan", American Potato Journal 46: 69–74
- 1979: (with Kenneth Swanberg, Carlos Zulberti, Barry Nestel) Caqueza: Living Rural Development, International Development Research Centre, Ottawa ISBN 9780889361676, link at Internet Archive
- 1981: (with others) A Methodology for On-Farm Cropping Systems Research, International Rice Research Institute
- 1995: (forward to) Gregory J. Scott (editor) Prices, Products, and People: analyzing agricultural markets in developing countries, Lynne Rienner Publishers ISBN 9781555876098
- Lang, James; Zandstra, Hubert G. (2001). Notes of a Potato Watcher. Texas A&M University Agriculture Series. College Station: Texas A&M University Press. ISBN 1585441384.

== Awards ==
- Order of the Sun of Peru
- Honorary degree from University of Caldas, Columbia
