= Heidi Kühn =

American nonprofit CEO

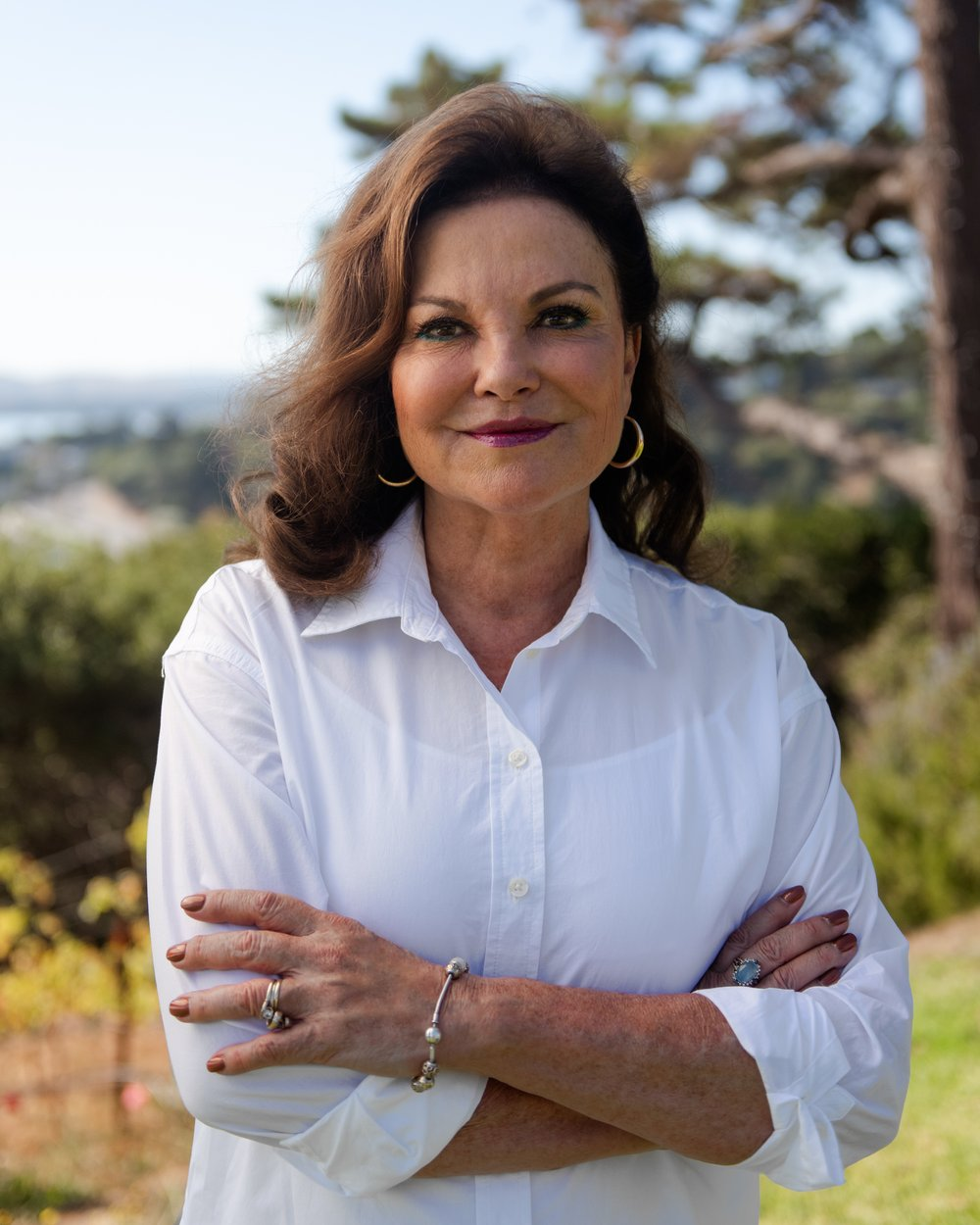
- Kuhn in 2024
- Born: c. 1960 (age c. 65); California, United States
- Occupations: CEO of Roots of Peace nonprofit organization that removes landmines and replace them with agriculturally productive lands
- Known for: World Food Prize recipient in 2023
- Notable work: Breaking Ground: From Landmines to Grapevines, One Woman's Mission to Heal the World
- Spouse: Gary Kuhn
- Children: 4

Heidi Kühn (born c. 1960) was the 2023 winner of the World Food Prize for her work with the nonprofit organization Roots of Peace to remove landmines around the world and turn the land into productive agricultural areas.

== Early life and education ==
Kühn comes from Marin County, California, and traces her ancestors back five generations to early settlers who became farmers. She attended San Rafael High School in San Rafael, and was a high school exchange student in Japan. In 1979, she obtained a degree in political economics from the University of California, Berkeley (UCB), where she met her husband. Living in Juneau, capital of Alaska, she founded a television news company and reported for major television networks on the Exxon Valdez oil spill. She was also the first US reporter to visit the eastern region of the Soviet Union.

== Roots of Peace ==
After surviving cancer, Kühn set up the nonprofit organization Roots of Peace in 1997. Initially the aim was to contribute to landmine removal but she realized that this was not enough and that the land had to be restored as agricultural land. Starting in Croatia, her original plan was to replace "mines with vines". For this, she sought funding from the Californian winemaking industry, approaching notable producers such as Mike Grgich, Robert Mondavi, Diane Disney Miller and Francis Ford Coppola. In Croatia, Roots of Peace assisted farmers to re-establish both vineyards and orchards, making use of modern techniques such as cement trellising for vines. Her NGO planted 25,000 grapevines and 14,000 apple trees, as well as cherry trees and lavender. Roots of Peace now has 300 employees with an annual budget of $200 million.

In addition to Croatia, Roots of Peace has worked in Afghanistan, Angola, Azerbaijan, Bosnia and Herzegovina, Cambodia, Guatemala, Iraq, Israel, Palestine, and Vietnam. Realising that grapes were not always the most appropriate crop to grow, Kühn pursued a policy of conducting rigorous feasibility studies to identify the best crops for demined areas. In Quảng Trị in Vietnam, for example, she partnered with the UK-based Mines Advisory Group to remove mines from famers' fields and then prepare the land so that black-pepper vines could be planted. Black pepper is a traditional crop in the area. Later, Kuhn's family set up a business to market the pepper in the US. In Afghanistan the organization introduced table grapes and set up farmer field schools that trained more than 220,000 farmers. In total, Roots of Peace has removed more than 100,000 landmines and unexploded bombs and helped over one million farmers. However, Kühn admits that this is just a drop in the ocean as there are an estimated 60 million landmines preventing agricultural cultivation in 60 countries. Roots of Peace works closely with Daniel Kammen, a professor at UCB, who advises on best practices with regenerative agriculture.

In October 2024 it was announced that The Kühn Initiative for Post-Conflict Development Studies had been established with the Center for Middle Eastern Studies (CMES) at UCB to explore sustainable economic and agricultural development in societies recovering from military and civil conflict. The initiative aims to unite academic experts, charitable foundations, and governmental organizations to develop innovative approaches to advance peace through agriculture.

== Awards and honours ==
Kühn has received many awards, in addition to the 2023 World Food Prize. They include:

- Skoll Award for Social Innovation, in 2006.
- Jacqueline Kennedy Onassis Award for Outstanding Public Service Benefiting Local Communities, in 2007 (shared with four others).
- Mahatma Gandhi Global Family Seva Medal, in 2019.
- Mother Teresa Award for Social Justice, in 2023.
- In September 2024 she was appointed chair of the U.S. 250 Council of the Smithsonian Institution's Center for Folklife and Cultural Heritage.
- 2024 Nobel Peace Prize nominee

== Publication ==
Kühn's book Breaking Ground: From Landmines to Grapevines, One Woman's Mission to Heal the World was published in April 2020.

== Personal life ==
Kühn is married to Gary Kühn and resides in San Rafael, California with 4 children and 7 grandchildren.
