= Simon Groot =

Dutch seed breeder (1934–2025)

- Groot, c. 2021
- Born: Simon Nanne Groot; 25 October 1934; Enkhuizen, Netherlands
- Died: 6 July 2025 (aged 90); Enkhuizen, Netherlands
- Education: Erasmus University Rotterdam
- Occupation: Agronomist
- Known for: East-West Seed
- Awards: World Food Prize

Simon Nanne Groot (25 October 1934 – 6 July 2025) was a Dutch agronomist whose work focused on producing disease resistant crops and improving seed growth and development. He was the founder of the company East-West Seed and was the 2019 winner of the World Food Prize.

== Early life ==
Born on 25 October 1934 into a family of crop seed cultivators in the city of Enkhuizen, Netherlands, Groot was a sixth-generation member of the family business, Sluis & Groot. He received a degree in business economics from Erasmus University Rotterdam.

== Career ==
By 1981, Groot's family business was sold, prompting him to develop his own company named East-West Seed with the money made from the family sale. He officially launched the company in 1982 with Benito Domingo, a fellow seed seller located in the Philippines. The focus of the company was to develop and sell improved seed cultivars with an aim toward impoverished regions of the world that could most benefit from more disease-resistant and hardier crops. The company began selling in the Philippines first and Thailand by the late 1980s before expanding into Indonesia in the 1990s and the rest of Southeast Asia. The sale of seeds to countries in Africa began in the late 2000s, focusing on East Africa. East-West's F1 hybrids were made using local cultivars, including the creation of a popular variety of Thai pepper.

Groot noted that it was initially difficult to get farmers in the Philippines to commit to using hybrid seeds, with only 20 percent of the farming population in the country committing to the idea by 1992. The Access to Seeds Index published in 2016 rated companies which provided seed cultivars to developing countries: East-West Seed came in top for East Africa and for vegetable seeds globally. The company said that their bitter gourd hybrid was one of the most popular seeds sold. By 2019, East-West's hybrid cultivars were being sold in over 60 countries throughout the developing world.

== Awards and honours ==
Groot was given the 2015 Mansholt Award for sustainable entrepreneurship for his work with East-West Seed in providing seed cultivars to improve the agriculture of developing countries. In early 2019, he was given an honorary Doctor of Laws degree from the University of the Philippines Los Baños. In 2019, he was awarded the World Food Prize for "his transformative role in empowering millions of smallholder farmers in more than 60 countries to earn greater incomes through enhanced vegetable production, benefiting hundreds of millions of consumers with greater access to nutritious vegetables for healthy diets."

== Death ==
Groot died in Enkhuizen on 6 July 2025, at the age of 90.
