= Gebisa Ejeta =

Ethiopian American geneticist

- Born: 1950 (age 75–76); Wollonkomi, Ethiopia
- Education: Purdue University
- Awards: World Food Prize (2009)
- Scientific career
- Fields: Plant breeding, Genetics

Gebisa Ejeta (born 1950) is an Ethiopian American plant breeder, geneticist and Professor at Purdue University. In 2009, he won the World Food Prize for his major contributions in the production of sorghum.

== Early years ==
Ejeta was born in the remote village Wollonkomi, Ethiopia to Oromo parents. Encouraged by his mother, he walked 20 kilometres to the nearest elementary school every Sunday evening and spend the week there.

During primary school, Ejeta planned to study engineering when he reached college age. However, his mother convinced him he could do more working in agriculture. With assistance from the Oklahoma State University, he attended an agricultural and technical secondary school in Ethiopia, and also studied at what is now Haramaya University. The university and the U.S. Agency for International Development helped him earn a doctorate from Purdue University.

Working in Sudan during the early 1980s, Ejeta developed Africa's first commercial hybrid variety of sorghum tolerant to drought. Later, with a Purdue University colleague in Indiana, he discovered the chemical basis of the relationship between the deadly parasitic weed striga and sorghum, and was able to produce sorghum varieties resistant to both drought and striga.

In 2011 President Barack Obama appointed Gebisa Ejeta as Member, Board for International Food and Agricultural Development.

The National Medal of Science was awarded to Ejeta by President Biden in 2023.

== Awards ==
- 2023 National Medal of Science for "outstanding contributions to the science of plant genetics."

== Publications ==
Ongom, Patrick O. and G. Ejeta. 2018. Mating design and genetic structure of a multi-parent advanced generation inter-cross (MAGIC) population of sorghum (Sorghum bicolor (L.) Moench). G3 Genes/Genomes/Genet. 8(1):331-341.

Ongom, Patrick O., J. Volenec, G. Ejeta. 2016. Selection for drought tolerance in sorghum using desiccants to simulate post-anthesis drought stress. Field Crops Research. 198(2016): 312-321.

Gobena, D., M. Shimels, P. Rich, C. Ruyter-Spira, H. Broumeester, S. Kanuganti, T. Mengiste, and G. Ejeta. 2017. Mutation in sorghum, LOW GERMINATION STIMULANT 1 alters strigolactones and causes Striga resistance. Proc. National Acad. Sci. 114(17): 4471-4476

Saballos, A., G. Ejeta, E. Sanchez, C. Kang, and W. Vermerris. 2009. A genome-wide analysis of the cinnamyl alcohol dehydrogenase family in sorghum (Sorghum bicolor (L.) Moench) identifies SbCAD2 as the brown midrib6 gene. Genetics 181:783-795.

Vogler, R., T. Tesso, K. Johnson, and G. Ejeta. 2009. Effect of allelic variation on forage quality of brown midrib sorghum mutants. African J. of Biochem. 3(3):70-76.

Peters, P., M. Jenks, P. Rich, J, Axtell, and G. Ejeta. 2009. Mutagenesis, selection, and allelic analysis of epicuticular wax mutants in sorghum. Crop Sci. 49:1249-1258.

Saballos, A., W. Vermerris, L. Rivera, and G. Ejeta. 2009. Allelic association, chemical characterization and saccharification properties of brown midrib mutants of sorghum (S. bicolor (L.) Moench). Bioenerg. Res. 1:193-204.

Rich, P. J. and G. Ejeta. 2008. Towards effective resistance to Striga in African maize. Plant Signaling & Behavior 3:9, 618-621.

Amusan, I. O., P. J. Rich, A. Menkir, T. Housley, and G. Ejeta. 2008. Resistance to Striga hermonthica in a maize inbred line derived from Zea diploperennis. New Phytologist 178:157-166.

Knoll, J. E. and G. Ejeta. 2008. Marker-assisted selection for early season cold tolerance in sorghum: QTL validation across populations and environments. Theor. Appl. Genet.116:541-553.

Honorary titles
Preceded by Dole and McGovern	World Food Prize; 2009	Succeeded by Beckmann and Luck
