= Mariangela Hungria =

Brazilian researcher and microbiologist

- Born: February 6, 1958 (age 68); Itapetininga, São Paulo, Brazil
- Education: University of São Paulo; Federal Rural University of Rio de Janeiro
- Known for: Biological nitrogen fixation, microbial inoculants, sustainable agriculture
- Awards: World Food Prize (2025); National Order of Scientific Merit (Grand Cross)
- Scientific career
- Fields: Agronomy, Microbiology
- Workplaces: Embrapa

Mariangela Hungria da Cunha (born 6 February 1958) is a Brazilian agronomist and microbiologist noted for pioneering work on biological nitrogen fixation (BNF) and the use of beneficial soil bacteria as microbial inoculants for tropical crops. Since 1982 she has been a researcher with the Brazilian Agricultural Research Corporation (Embrapa), helping farmers reduce the need for chemical fertilizers by incorporating beneficial soil bacteria. In 2025 she became the first Brazilian woman to receive the World Food Prize, for “extraordinary scientific advancements in biological nitrogen fixation” that transformed tropical agriculture. She is a member of the Brazilian Academy of Sciences.

== Early life and education ==
Dr. Hungria was born in Itapetininga, São Paulo. Her interest in microbiology began after reading Microbe Hunters by Paul de Kruif, a gift from her grandmother. She earned a BSc in agronomy (1979) and an MSc in soils and plant nutrition (1981) from the Luiz de Queiroz College of Agriculture (ESALQ) at the University of São Paulo, and a PhD in soil science from the Federal Rural University of Rio de Janeiro (1985).

== Career and research ==
Hungria joined Embrapa in 1982 under the mentorship of soil‑microbiology pioneer Johanna Döbereiner. She completed postdoctoral work at Cornell University, the University of California, Davis, and the University of Seville, then transferred in 1991 to Embrapa’s soybean center in Londrina, Paraná.

Her research focuses on biological nitrogen fixation and microbial inoculants as sustainable alternatives to synthetic fertilisers. She helped isolate and select efficient Bradyrhizobium strains for soybean inoculation and demonstrated yield increases without additional chemical nitrogen use. She also advanced co‑inoculation with Bradyrhizobium and Azospirillum brasilense, improving nitrogen uptake and yields in soybeans and common beans. By the 2020s, her technologies were used on more than 40 million hectares of Brazilian farmland, reducing fertiliser costs and greenhouse gas emissions.

Hungria has published over 500 scientific papers and produced a Portuguese-language laboratory manual for tropical soil-microbiology methods.

== Awards and honours ==
- World Food Prize (2025).
- TWAS–Lenovo Science Award (2020), presented by The World Academy of Sciences.
- National Order of Scientific Merit – Commander (2008) and Grand Cross (2018).
