= Sunhak Peace Prize =

- Awarded for: Individuals and organizations
- Location: Seoul, South Korea
- Presented by: Sunhak Peace Prize Committee
- First award: August 28, 2015
- Website: Sunhak Peace Prize

The Sunhak Peace Prize (Korean: 선학평화상; Hanja: 鮮鶴平和賞) is an award. It was established to continue the legacy of Sun Myung Moon, founder of the Unification Church, and is given biennially in Seoul, Korea, in recognition of individuals and organizations that have made contributions to help resolve worldwide suffering, poverty, and threats to the environment.

Laureates are selected by the Sunhak Peace Prize Selection Committee, chaired by the former President of the European Commission and the first chair of the GAVI Board, José Manuel Barroso. The Prize is organized by the Sunhak Peace Prize Foundation, chaired by Thomas G. Walsh.

The Prize is awarded by the Universal Peace Federation (UPF), founded by South Korean Unification Church leader Hak Ja Han.

The Sunhak Peace Prize is awarded to those acknowledged as contributors to peace and human development. It was founded at the behest of Hak Ja Han Moon, the widow of Sun Myung Moon, to honor his ideals and achievements as an alternative to the Nobel Peace Prize. It advocates for sustainable human development, conflict resolution, and ecological conservation.

Eligible laureates must be living at the time of the nomination in order to receive the award.

During the award ceremony, the laureate is awarded a medal and plaque and a monetary prize of US$1 million.

== History ==
In 2013, the establishment of the Sunhak Peace Prize was proposed by Mrs. Moon, with the Sunhak Peace Prize Committee being inaugurated a year later.

The first award ceremony was held in 2015 and focused on climate change and the food crisis. It was awarded to Anote Tong, the former President of Kiribati, who led a crusade against climate change, with particular focus on countries in the Pacific Region and to Modadugu Gupta, an Indian fisheries scientist who pioneered the aquacultural revolution.

The second award ceremony in 2017 highlighted the global refugee crisis and was awarded to two individuals: Gino Strada, a heart surgeon who provided free medical care for refugees and war victims, and Sakena Yacoobi, who spearheaded Afghan refugee education programs with a special focus for females.

In 2019, the third award ceremony placed emphasis on the worsening issue of global inequality. The award recipients on that occasion were Akinwumi Ayodeji Adesina and Waris Dirie. The ceremony recognised Adesina for reducing poverty in Africa through the agricultural revolution. Dirie, a human rights activist, tried to raise the humanitarian concern of the practice of female genital mutilation (FGM), and she assisted in passing a worldwide resolution to try to ban its practice.

In honor of the 100th anniversary of the birth of founder Rev. Sun Myung Moon, the fourth award ceremony (2020) includes a Founders’ Centenary Award. Interdependence, mutual prosperity, and universal values are the "visions of peace". The Founders' Centenary Award was awarded to former UN Secretary-General Ban Ki-moon. The 4th Sunhak Peace Prizes are being awarded to President Macky Sall of Senegal, and former President of the Lutheran World Federation, Bishop Munib A. Younan of Palestine.

== Laureates ==
=== Peace Prize Laureates ===
Year	Laureates	Country	Reason for selection
2015	Anote Tong	Kiribati	Improved global awareness of the severity of climate change and sought action by the international community for its solution.
2015	Modadugu Vijay Gupta	India	Pioneered the blue revolution and made innovative contributions to aquaculture development as an alternative solution to the looming food crisis.
2017	Gino Strada	Italy	Providing emergency medical relief in the Middle East and Africa and advocating for refugees’ right to be cured; Contributing to spreading a culture of peace through anti-war movement
2017	Sakena Yacoobi	Afghanistan	Presenting a fundamental solution to refugee resettlement through education and contributing to the improvement of human rights and status of Muslim women
2019	Waris Dirie	Somalia	A human rights activist who publicized the issue of Female Genital Mutilation (FGM) to the world; Advocating human rights of girls and women and calling for a worldwide resolution to eradicate FGM
2019	Akinwumi Ayodeji Adesina	Nigeria	Spearheading Good Governance of Africa through Agricultural Innovation and Eradication of Poverty.
2020	Macky Sall	Senegal	Promoting a model of good governance in Africa; Reducing the presidential term; Developing Senegal as a model democratic country through reformations such as the Plan Senegal Emergent
2020	Munib Younan	Israel	Pioneering religious harmony; Promoting harmony among Islam, Christianity and Judaism in the Middle East leading the reconciliation between the Catholic and Protestant Churches
2022	Dame Sarah Catherine Gilbert	United Kingdom	Protecting lives in underdeveloped countries with vulnerable medical conditions by providing affordable Oxford-AstraZeneca vaccines for easy storage and transportation during the COVID-19 outbreak.
2022	Gavi, The Vaccine Alliance	Switzerland(HQ)	Improving the overall health of humanity by increasing access to vaccines for children in vulnerable countries; Leading the "Covax Facility," an international joint vaccine purchase and distribution project after the outbreak of COVID-19

=== Founders' Award Laureates ===
Year	Laureates	Country	Reason for selection
2020	Ban Ki-moon	South Korea	Raising the alarm on the seriousness of climate change, and led the adoption of the Paris Agreement on Climate Change in 2015; Presenting a joint masterplan for humanity by adopting Sustainable Development Goals
2022	H.E. Samdech Hun Sen	Cambodia	Promoting international cooperation for peace by leading international peace forums and peace initiatives; Demonstrating outstanding leadership for the sustainable development in Southeast Asia
