= Daniel Hillel =

Agronomist and World Food Prize laureate (1930–2021)

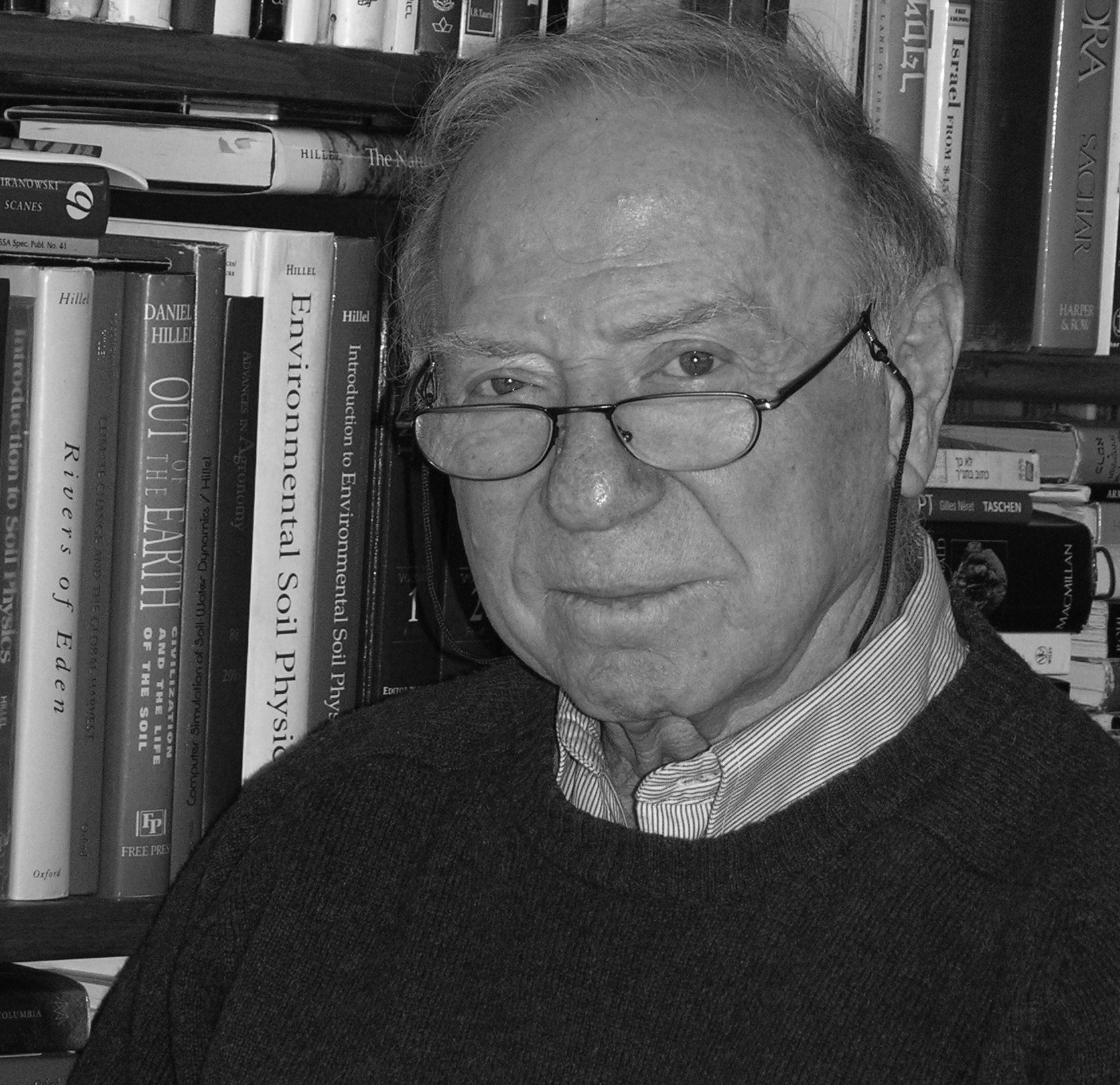
"We weren't the sons and grandsons in a long family line of farmers, so we had to start anew. This turned out to be an advantage" - Hillel

Daniel Hillel (Hebrew: דניאל הלל; 13 September 1930 – 9 March 2021) was an Israeli–American agronomist, researcher and author. Hillel was the World Food Prize laureate for 2012.

== Life ==
Hillel was born in Los Angeles, United States. He was raised in Palestine and later Israel. He lived on a kibbutz, traditional agriculture based communities in Israel. On returning to the States he completed his high school, and went on to study agronomy from University of Georgia and earth sciences from Rutgers University. In 1957 he completed his doctorate in soil physics and ecology at Hebrew University of Jerusalem, followed by two years as a postdoctoral researcher at University of California. During the 1950s, Hillel took part in Israel's first effort to map its agriculture related resources. He then joined the agriculture community at Sde Boker. In the coming decades, he would use his expertise in irrigation to help improve agricultural output in 30 countries. Hillel was on the staff of Goddard Institute for Space Studies.

== Bibliography ==
- Hillel, Daniel (1992). Out of the Earth: Civilization and the Life of the Soil. University of California Press. ISBN 978-0-520-08080-5.
- ————— (1994). Rivers of Eden: The Struggle for Water and the Quest for Peace in the Middle East. Oxford University Press. ISBN 978-0-19-508068-1.
- ————— (1998). Environmental Soil Physics: Fundamentals, Applications, and Environmental Considerations. Elsevier. ISBN 978-0-08-054415-1.
- ————— (2000). Salinity Management for Sustainable Irrigation. World Bank Publications. ISBN 978-0-8213-4773-7.
- ————— (2003). Introduction to Environmental Soil Physics. Elsevier. ISBN 978-0-08-049577-4.
- ————— (2006). The Natural History of the Bible: An Environmental Exploration of the Hebrew Scriptures. Columbia University Press. ISBN 978-0-231-13363-0.
- ————— (2007). Soil in the Environment: Crucible of Terrestrial Life. Elsevier. ISBN 978-0-08-055496-9.
- ————— (2012). Applications of Soil Physics. Elsevier. ISBN 978-0-323-15213-6.
- ————— (2012). Soil and Water: Physical Principles and Processes. Elsevier. ISBN 978-0-323-15670-7.
- ————— (2013). Introduction to Soil Physics. Academic Press. ISBN 978-0-08-091869-3.
- ————— (2013). Fundamentals of Soil Physics. Academic Press. ISBN 978-0-08-091870-9.
- ————— (2014). Memories And Reflections: The Life, Work And Observations Of An Agricultural And Environmental Scientist. Imperial College Press. World Scientific. ISBN 978-1-78326-574-9.
