= Borlaug Dialogue =

Annual symposium on global food security

Eastern Shore students listen and take notes during the Borlaug Symposium commemorating the late Dr. Norman Borlaug's 100th Birthday in the Jefferson Auditorium of the U.S. Department of Agriculture (USDA) headquarters, in Washington, D.C. on Tuesday, Mar. 25, 2014

The Norman E. Borlaug International Symposium, commonly known as the Borlaug Dialogue, is an annual international symposium tackling the topic of global food security organized by the World Food Prize Foundation. Past symposia have focused on the promises and challenges presented by biofuels for global development, the dual challenges of malnutrition and obesity, water insecurity and its impact on development and stability in the Middle East, and the possibility of replicating the Green Revolution.

== 2014 ==
The 2014 "Borlaug Dialogue" was held on October 15–17, 2014 to coincide with the 100th anniversary of founder Dr. Norman Borlaug's birth.

2014 Discussion topics ranged from:

- taking stock of where we currently stand in meeting the "greatest challenge in human history";
- closing yield gaps while addressing pressing water, gender and nutrition challenges and disparities;
- the role of information technology and data to increase productivity, conserve the environment, adapt to climate volatility and consumer needs, and improve the lives of farmers and other participants along the value chain;
- sustainable intensification to improve productivity with a special focus on soils and fertilizers;
- innovations in insurance and agrofinancing;
- and the role of the next generation in the fight against hunger through the DialogueNEXT conversation that features young innovators and thought leaders who are contributing new ideas, concepts and achievements toward this goal.

Notable speakers included:

- Ernest Bai Koroma, President, Republic of Sierra Leone
- Kanayo F. Nwanze, President, International Fund for Agricultural Development
- Thomas J. Vilsack, Secretary of Agriculture, United States
- Enrique Martinez y Martinez, Secretary of Agriculture, Mexico
- Florence Chenoweth, Minister of Agriculture, Liberia

== Norman Borlaug Award for Field Research and Application ==
Norman Borlaug Field Award is presented every October, with $10,000 endowed by the Rockefeller Foundation, during the symposium by the World Food Prize Foundation to recognise "researchers under 40 who emulate the scientific innovation and dedication to food security of Dr. Norman Borlaug".

Recipients:

Source: World Food Prize

- 2024: Dr. Dennis Beesigamukama (Uganda)
- 2023: Dr. Swati Nayak (India)
- 2022: Dr. Mahalingam Govindaraj (India)
- 2021: Dr. Elliott Dossou-Yovo (Benin)
- 2020: Dr. Salma Sultana (Bangladesh)
- 2019: Dr. Hale Ann Tufan, for championing the incorporation of gender-supportive activities within the global agricultural research community, working across disciplines to ensure women farmers and scientists are fairly represented in the lab, in the field and at the table
- 2018: Dr. Matthew Rouse, for his essential leadership efforts to contain and reduce the impact of Ug99, a devastating new race of the stem rust pathogen that poses a serious threat to the world’s wheat crops and global food security
- 2017: Dr. Zhenling Cui, for his scientific and extension work in improving soil health and increasing crop production through the implementation of innovative on-farm fertilizer management strategies
- 2016: Andrew Mude, for his persistence in his science-based, community mediated, and innovative approach to providing financial protection, through insurance, to millions of poor herders and their families who care for and depend upon their livestock as they move across the vast rangelands of East Africa
- 2015: Eric Pohlman, for his work in developing highly innovative programs that are transforming subsistence agriculture in rural Rwanda.
- 2014: Dr. Bram Govaerts, for his work developing leading-edge, sustainable programs that are transforming subsistence agriculture and unsustainable farming systems in Mexico and other regions of the world into productive and sustainable production operations.
- 2013: Dr. Charity Kawira Mutegi, for her efforts to identify the cause of, and solution to, a deadly outbreak of aflatoxicosis in 2004-05. Her diligent research led to innovative solutions to avert future outbreaks and safeguard Kenya's staple crop of maize.
- 2012: Dr. Aditi Mukherji, for her research on groundwater resources in agriculture, which led to major policy changes benefiting thousands of farmers in West Bengal.

== See also ==
- Norman Borlaug
- World Food Prize
- List of agriculture awards
