= Pamela K. Anderson =

International Potato Center executive, 2004–2013

Board member of the Board for International Food and Agriculture Development
- Incumbent
- Assumed office 2016

Pamela K. Anderson was the Director General of the International Potato Center, or CIP (Centro Internacional de la Papa) 2004–2013. Anderson holds a D.Sc. in Populations Sciences/Vector Entomology from the Harvard University School of Public Health as well as two master's degrees in entomology and human ecology.

She assumed the Directorship of CIP in 2004 from Dr. Hubert Zandstra, who had led the Center since 1991. She joined CIP in 2002, and has worked in Latin America on food supply issues for 25 years. She was previously the organization's deputy director of general research.

She became a member of the Board for International Food and Agricultural Development (BIFAD) in 2016, appointed under then-President Barack Obama.
