= Pernella Anderson =

American educator and politician (1903–1980)

Pernella Mae Center Anderson (1903–1980) was an African American interviewer for the Federal Writers' Project. She was from El Dorado, Arkansas. She was the only African American woman in Arkansas to interview former slaves. She went on to teach in Detroit.
