= National economy =

National economy may refer to:

- Economy of a particular country
- The type of economy desired by economic nationalism
- National economy (Germany), theory developed by Friedrich List
- National economy (Turkey)
