= World Food Prize =

International award in human development

- Awarded for: "A specific, exceptionally significant, individual achievement that advances human development with a demonstrable increase in the quantity, quality, availability of, or access to food"
- Sponsored by: General Foods, John Ruan and family, followed by numerous others
- Location: Des Moines, Iowa, US
- Presented by: World Food Prize Foundation
- Hosted by: Mashal Husain, President of WFP
- Rewards: A diploma, a commemorative sculpture and a monetary award of US$500,000
- First award: 1987
- Final award: 2026
- Website: worldfoodprize.org

The World Food Prize is an international award recognizing the achievements of individuals who have advanced human development by improving the quality, quantity, or availability of food in the world. Conceived by Nobel Peace Prize laureate Norman Borlaug and established in 1986 through the support of General Foods, the prize is envisioned and promoted as the Nobel or the highest honors in the field of food and agriculture. It is now administered by the World Food Prize Foundation with support from numerous sponsors. Since 1987, the prize has been awarded annually to recognize contributions in any field involved in the world food supply, such as animal science, aquaculture, soil science, water conservation, nutrition, health, plant science, seed science, plant pathology, crop protection, food technology, food safety, policy, research, infrastructure, emergency relief, and poverty alleviation and hunger.

Laureates are honored and officially awarded their prize in Des Moines, Iowa, in an award ceremony held at the Iowa State Capitol. Laureates are presented with a diploma, a commemorative sculpture designed by Saul Bass and a monetary award of $500,000.

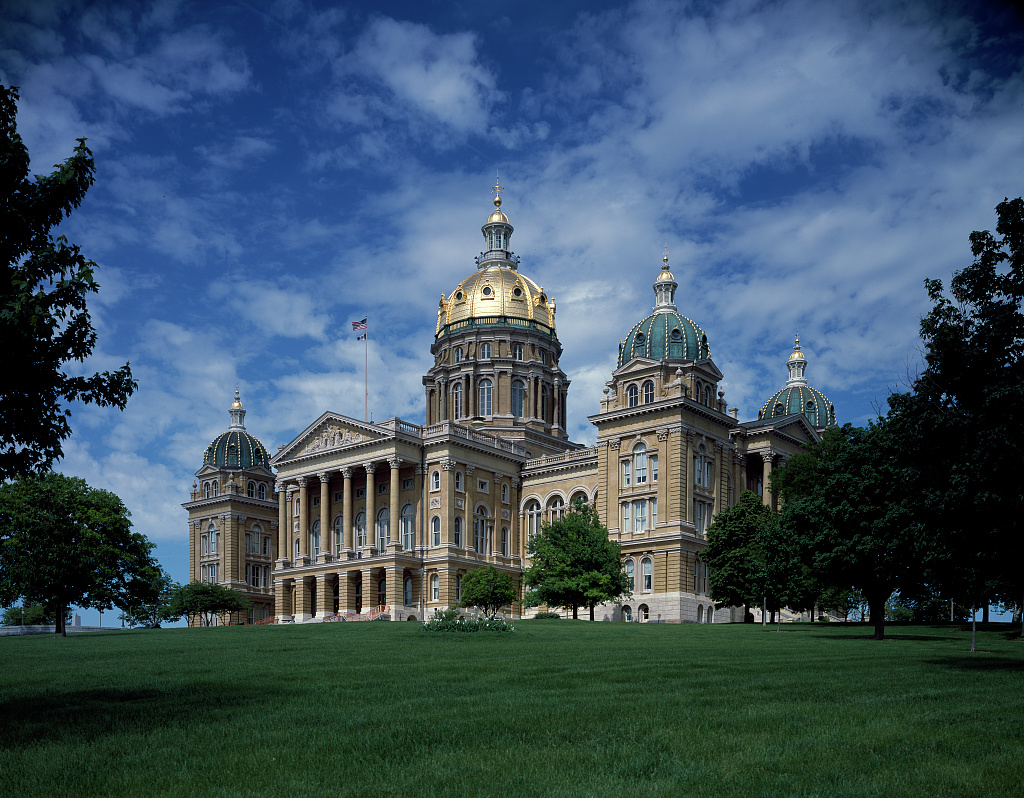
The Iowa State Capitol, where the laureates are honored and officially awarded their prize

The Foundation also has the aim of "inspiring exceptional achievement in assuring adequate food and nutrition for all". A number of associated events and honors include the Borlaug International Symposium and the Norman Borlaug Field Award, the Iowa Hunger Summit and youth programs such as the Borlaug-Ruan International Internships.

== History ==
Norman Borlaug (1914–2009) was awarded the Nobel Peace Prize in 1970 for contributions that resulted in the extensive increase in global food production. Chairman of the Nobel Committee Aase Lionæs gave the rationale that the committee had linked providing much needed food to the world as a path for peace. Further, the increase in food production has given policy planners across the world more years in figuring out how to feed the growing population. Twelve years later, Borlaug approached the Nobel Foundation to include a prize for food and agriculture. However, the Foundation was bound by Alfred Nobel's will which did not allow for the creation of such a new prize. Borlaug continued his search for a sponsor elsewhere.

In 1986, General Foods Corporation, under Vice President A. S. Clausi's leadership, agreed to establish the prize and be the founding sponsor. The amount they agreed to, US$200,000, was equivalent to the value of the Nobel Prizes at the time. In 1990, the sponsorship was undertaken by businessman and philanthropist John Ruan and his family who established the World Food Prize Foundation, backed by a US$10 million endowment. In 2000, Kenneth M. Quinn was made the president. Borlaug, Ruan, and Quinn were all from the US state of Iowa. Barbara Stinson succeeded Quinn as the second president in 2019.

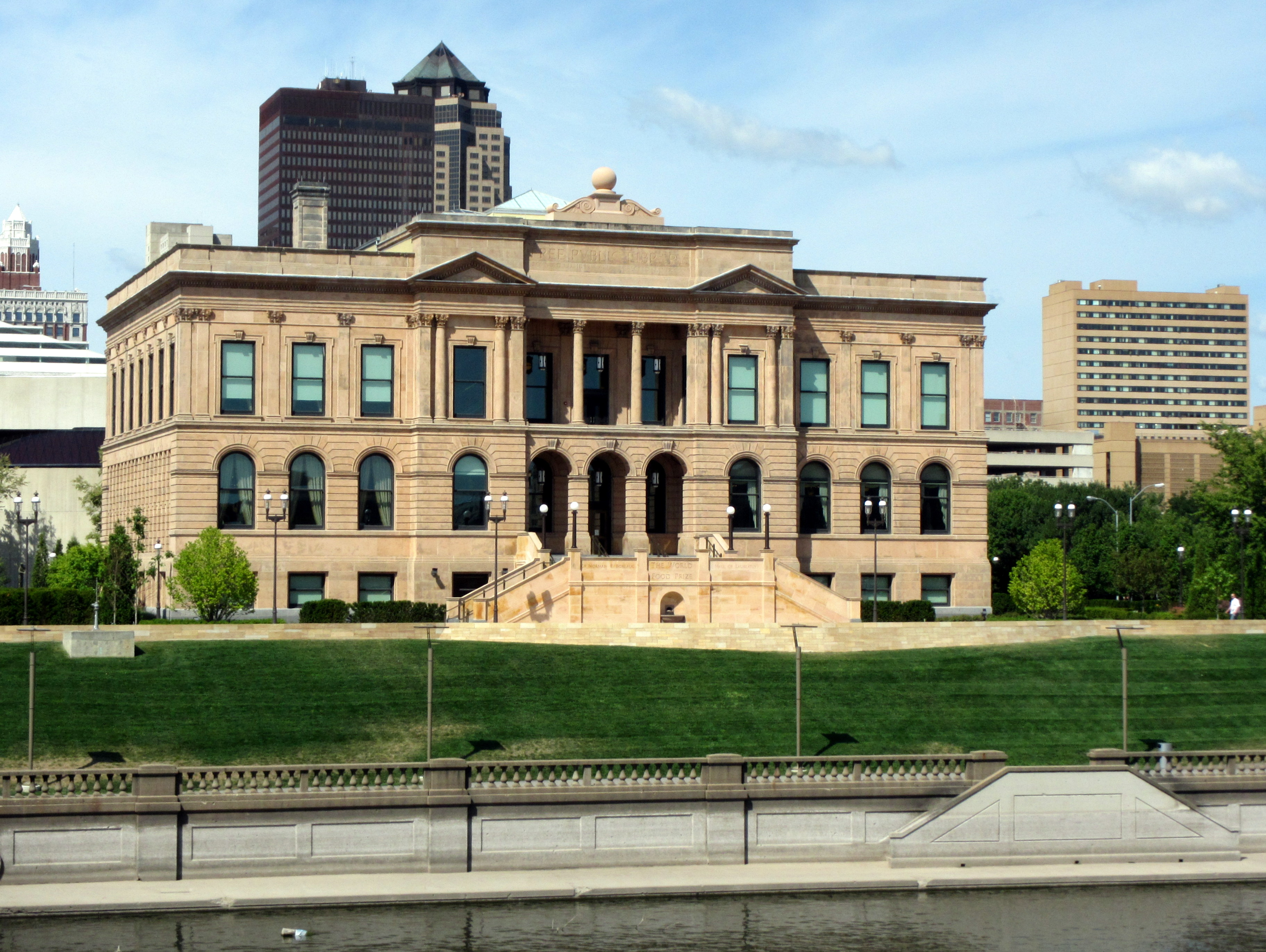
World Food Prize Hall of Laureates, the renovated and rehabilitated former Des Moines Library

The former downtown library in Des Moines, Iowa, was acquired, and the Ruan family gave US$5 million to renovate the building into the headquarters for the World Food Prize Foundation. A number of sponsors would go on to contribute over US$20 million in a campaign to transform the building into a public museum, the Hall of Laureates, to honor Borlaug and the work of the World Food Prize laureates. Other sponsors have included over 100 charitable foundations, corporations and individuals, who have helped sustain the prize and the Foundation's associated events. The Founder's Boardroom in the Hall of Laureates commemorates 27 individuals who played an important part in the foundation of the prize.

Borlaug was the first chairman of the World Food Prize laureate selection committee. He appointed the first laureate, M. S. Swaminathan, as his successor in 2009. Gebisa Ejeta, the 2009 laureate, is the current chairman. Apart from the chairman who is a non-voting member, other members of the selection committee remain anonymous.

On January 24, 2023, the Foundation announced that former Iowa governor and US ambassador to China Terry Branstad would take over as president, replacing outgoing president Barbara Stinson. On March 1, 2025, Governor Branstad retired from his role as president. Former CEO Mashal Husain was named the new president, with former Iowa governor and United States secretary of agriculture Tom Vilsack taking over as CEO.

== Laureates ==
World Food Prize laureates include the following:

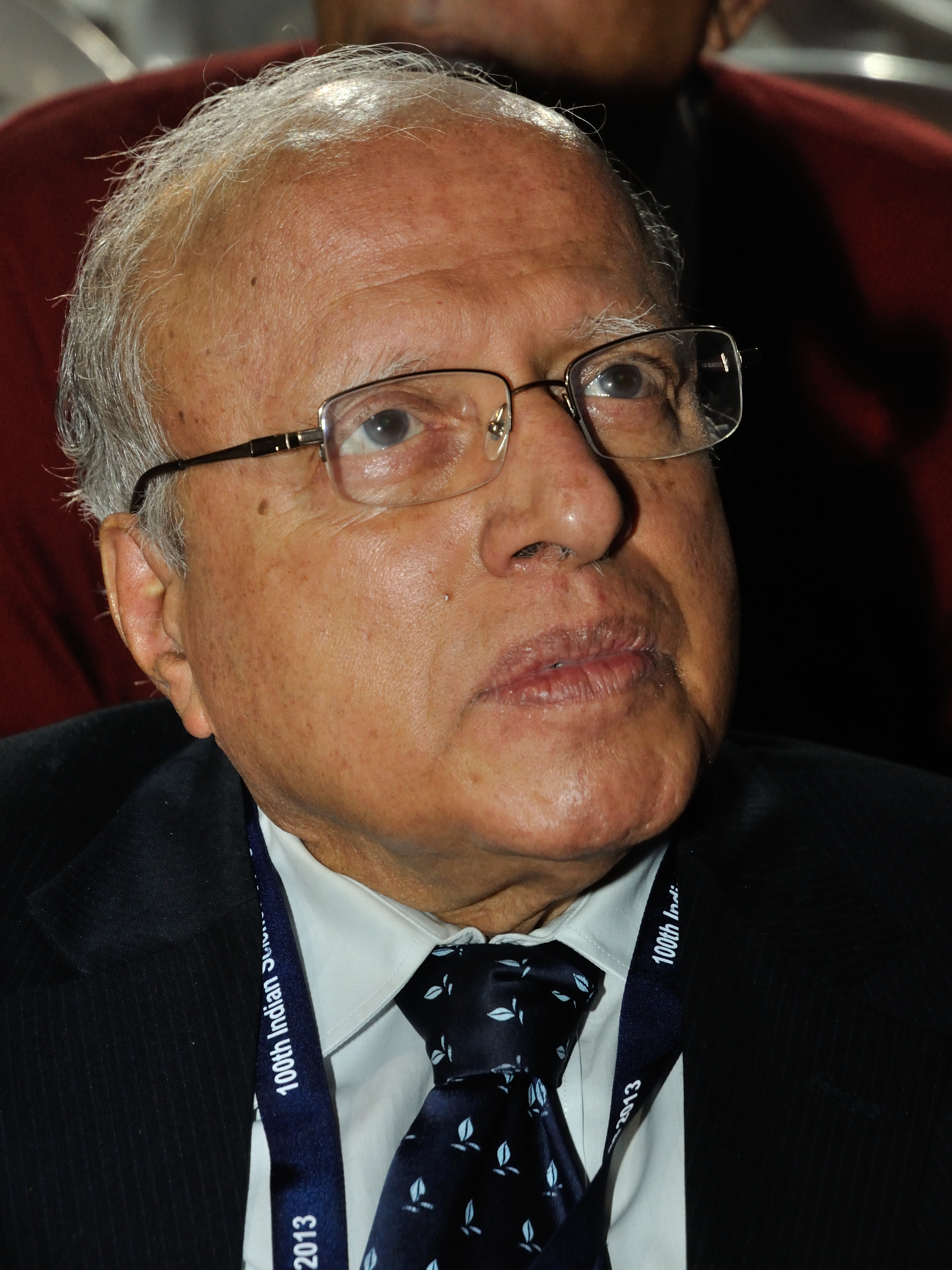
1987 recipient M. S. Swaminathan

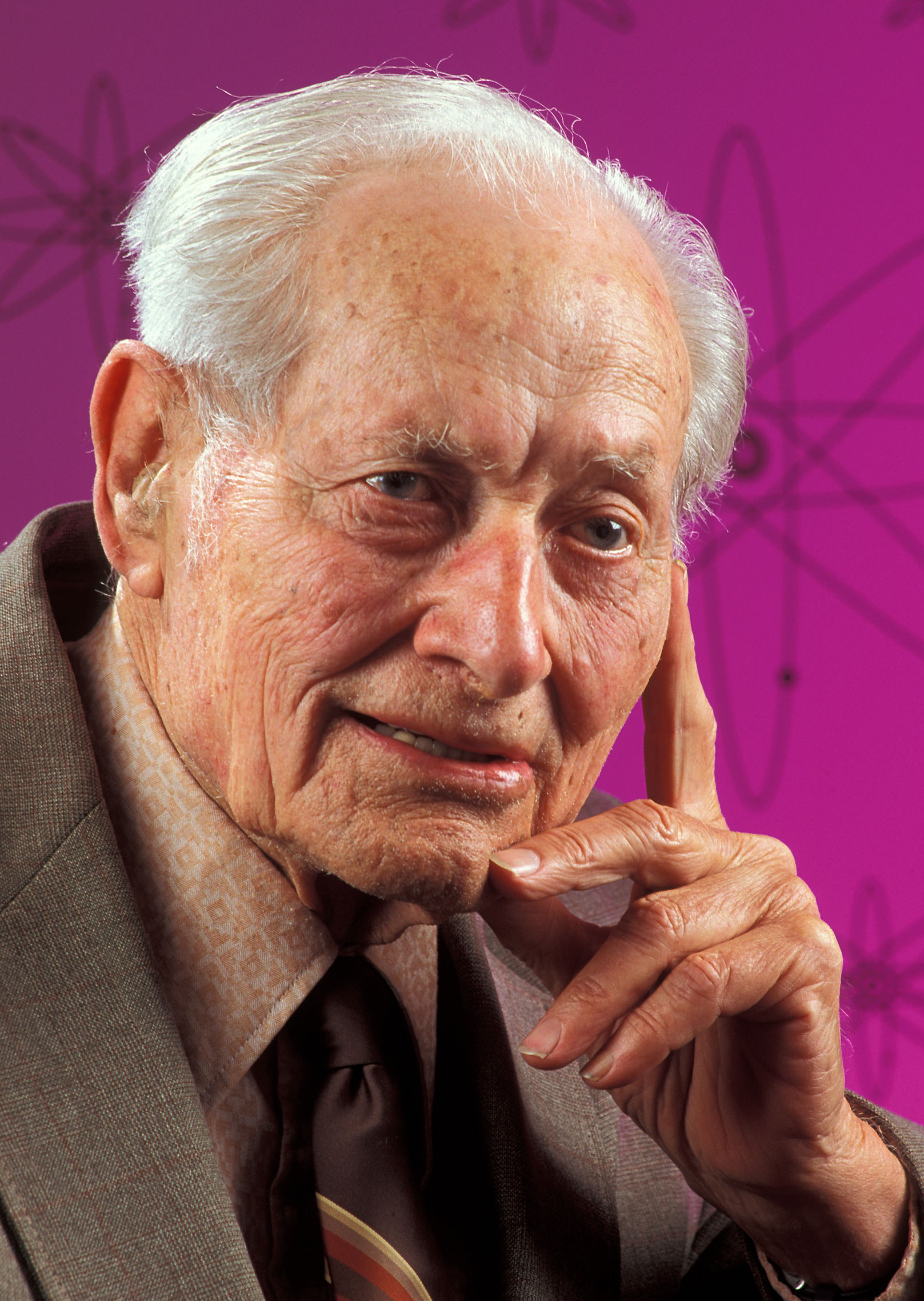
1992 recipient Edward F. Knipling

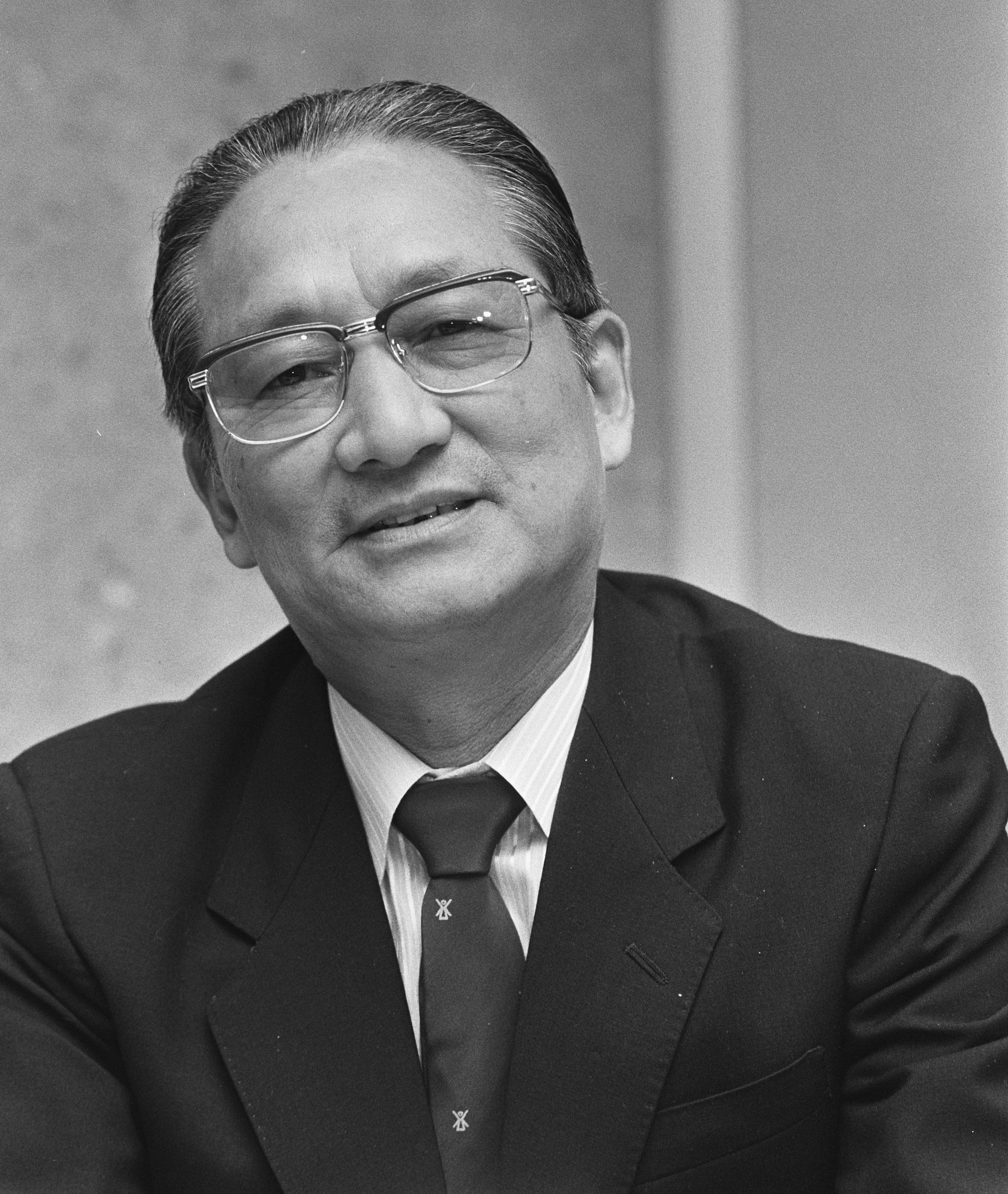
1993 recipient He Kang

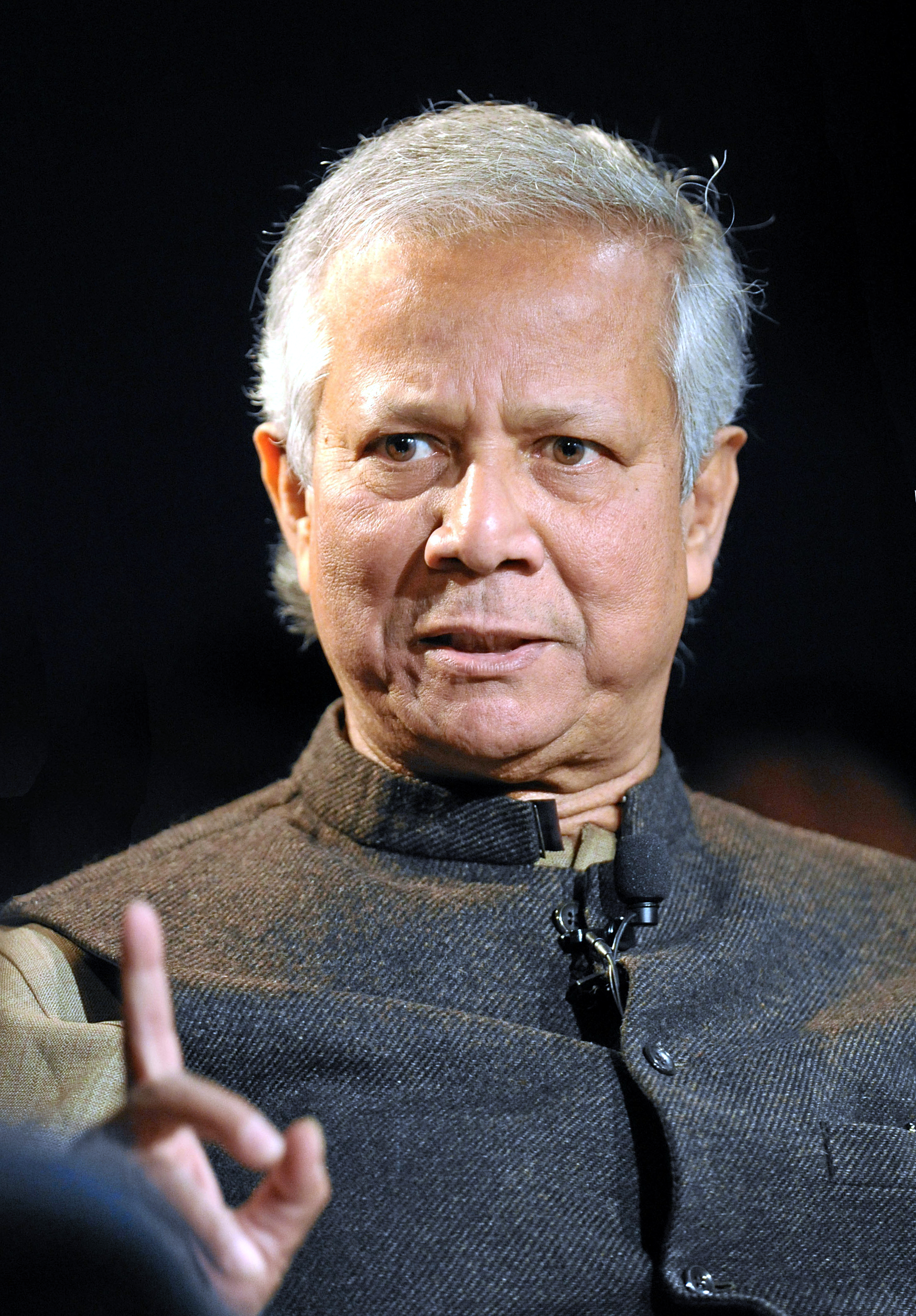
1994 recipient Muhammad Yunus

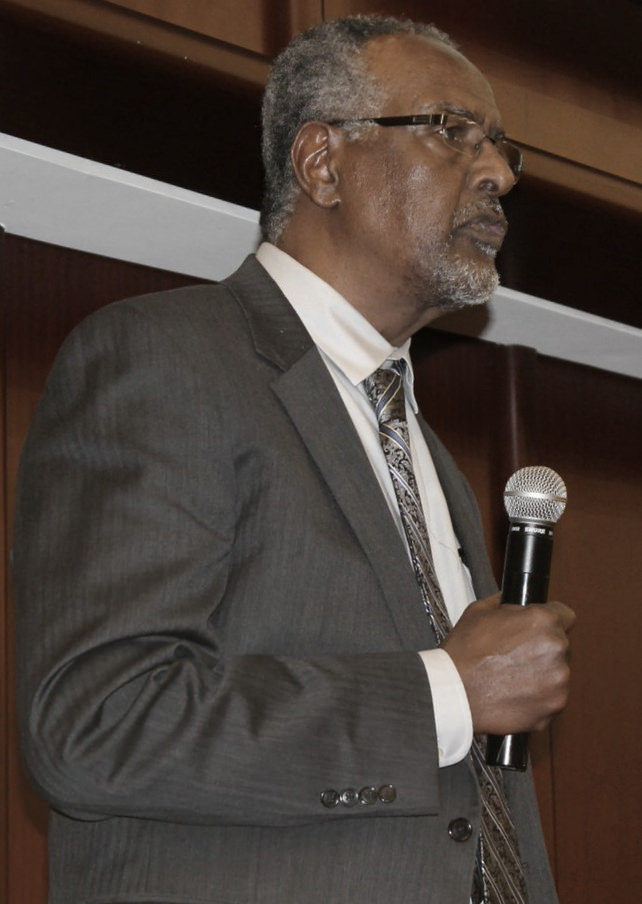
2009 recipient Gebisa Ejeta

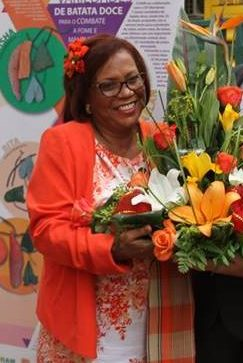
2016 recipient Maria Andrade

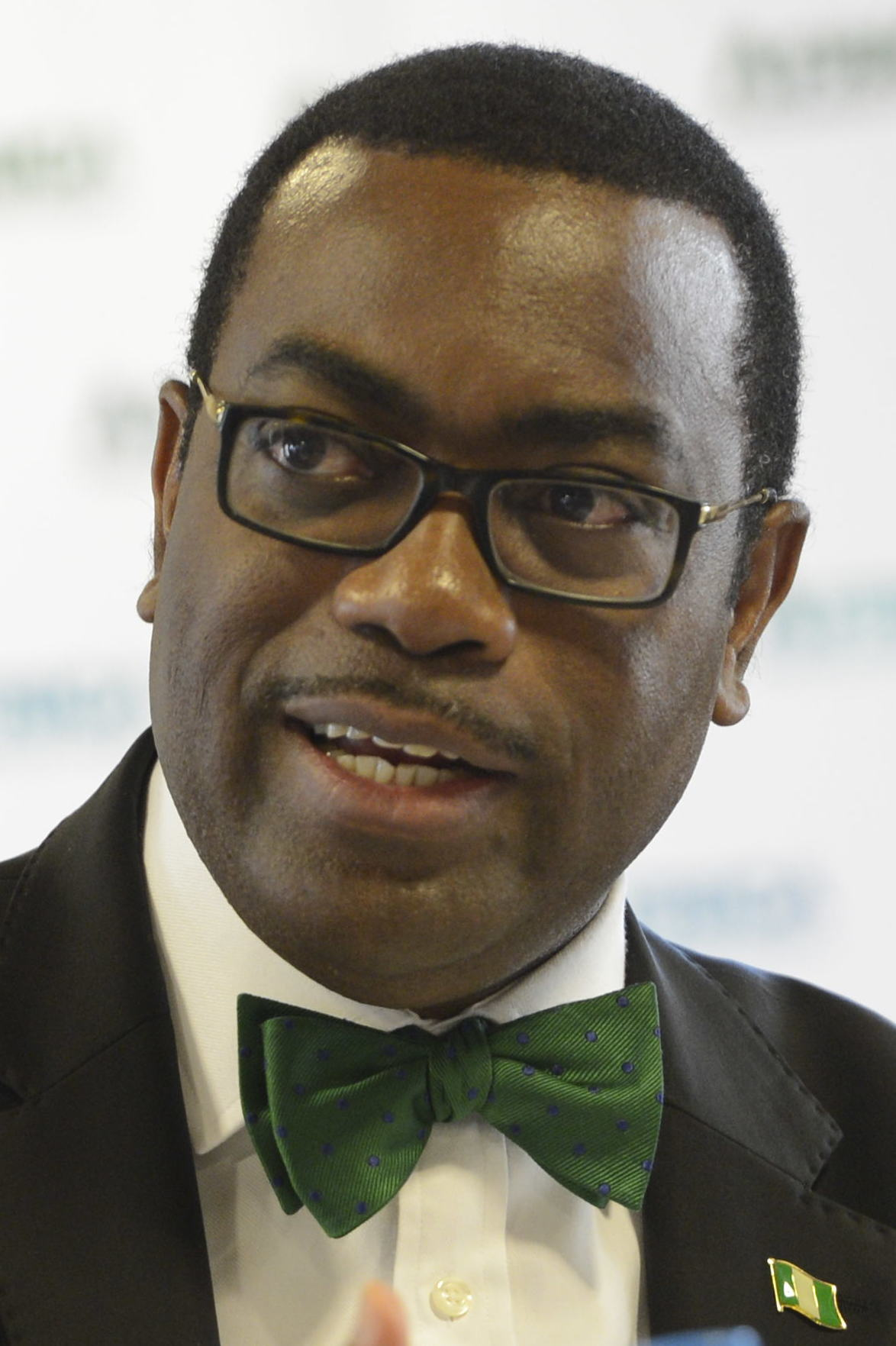
2017 recipient Akinwumi Adesina

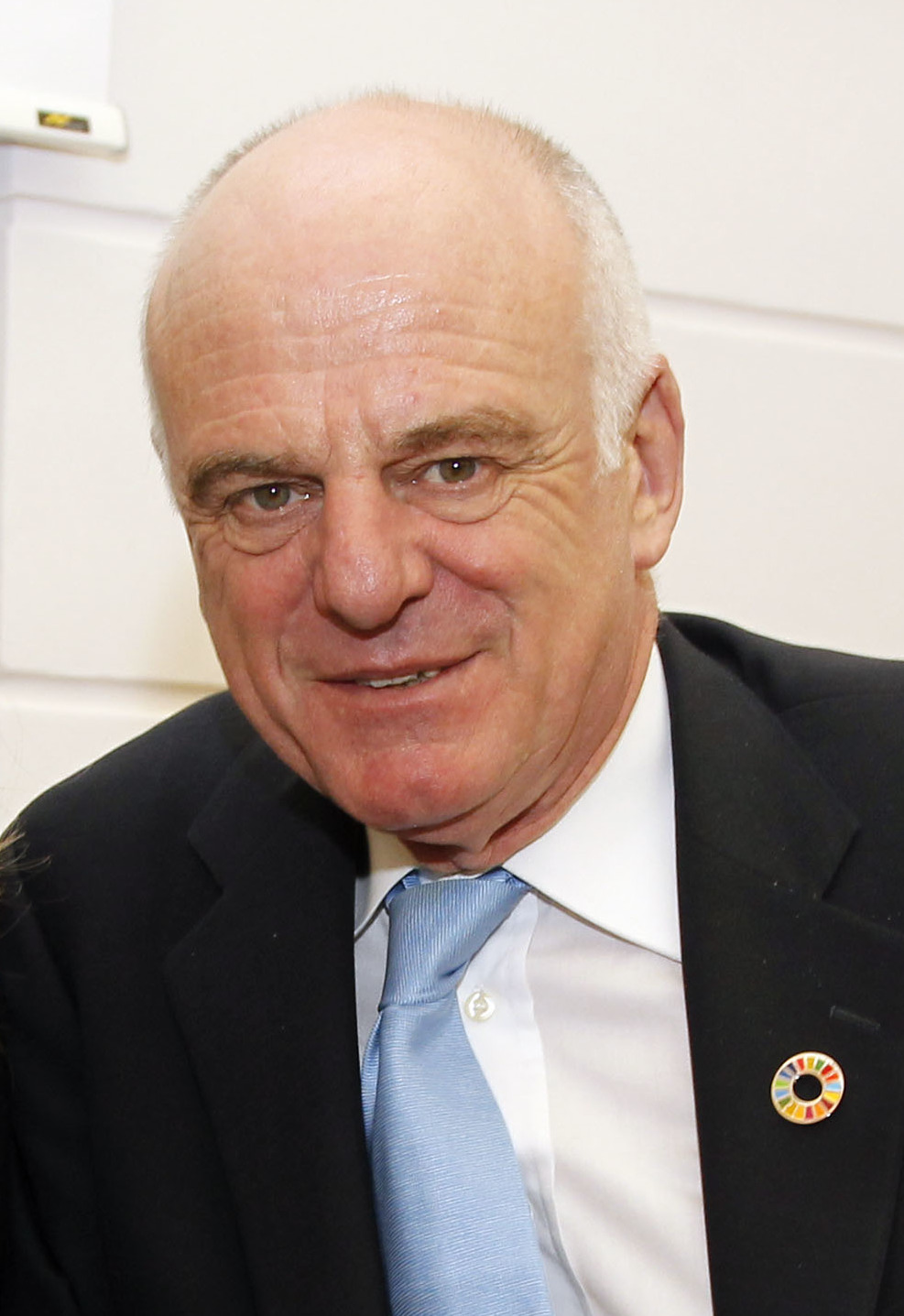
2018 recipient David Nabarro

Year	Laureate(s) (Note: Pre-fixes such as "Dr" and "Hon" have been omitted.)	Country (Note: According to worldfoodprize.org, the official website of The World Food Prize Foundation.)	Rationale	Ref.
1987	M. S. Swaminathan	India	For leadership and science in introducing high-yielding wheat and rice varieties to India in the 1960s starting India's Green Revolution, and for leadership at International Rice Research Institute	
1988	Robert F. Chandler	United States	For leadership in setting up the International Rice Research Institute and World Vegetable Center, paving the way for creation of CGIAR, and science leading to the development of high yield rice	
1989	Verghese Kurien	India	For leadership during Operation Flood, for making the farmer the owner of his cooperative, resulting in India emerging as the largest producer of milk	
1990	John Niederhauser	United States	For leadership and science research in potato production and improving its resistance to disease	
1991	Nevin S. Scrimshaw	United States	For human nutrition studies combatting protein, iodine, and iron deficiencies and developing nutrition rich foods	
1992	Edward F. Knipling	United States	For developing the sterile insect technique to control insect parasites that harm food supply	
1992	Raymond Bushland	United States	For developing the sterile insect technique to control insect parasites that harm food supply	
1993	He Kang	China	For reforms as head of the Ministry of Agriculture which made China self-sufficient in food production	
1994	Muhammad Yunus	Bangladesh	For innovative micro loan programs for the poor, providing millions of people access to more food and better nutrition	
1995	Hans Rudolf Herren	Switzerland	For developing a pest control program for the cassava mealybug, which could destroy African cassava crop	
1996	Henry Beachell	United States	For advances in rice breeding leading to substantially increased rice production benefitting numerous countries	
1996	Gurdev Khush	India	For advances in rice breeding leading to substantially increased rice production benefitting numerous countries	
1997	Ray F. Smith	United States	For individual and joint efforts in developing sustainable integrated pest management techniques	
1997	Perry Adkisson	United States	For individual and joint efforts in developing sustainable integrated pest management techniques	
1998	B.R. Barwale	India	For improving commercial access to high quality seeds throughout India	
1999	Walter Plowright	United Kingdom	For developing a vaccine against the cattle plague rinderpest	
2000	Evangelina Villegas	Mexico	For research and leadership in improving the productivity and nutritional content of maize through development of quality protein maize	
2000	Surinder Vasal	India	For research and leadership in improving the productivity and nutritional content of maize through development of quality protein maize	
2001	Per Pinstrup-Andersen	Denmark	For research efforts leading to changes in policy in several countries related to food subsidy	
2002	Pedro A. Sanchez	United States	For development of methods to restore fertility to degraded soils in Africa and South America.	
2003	Catherine Bertini	United Nations	For transforming the World Food Programme into an effective humanitarian food relief organization	
2004	Yuan Longping	China	For the development of the first hybrid rice varieties including the technologies needed for it	
2004	Monty Jones	Sierra Leone	For the development of New Rice for Africa, with the potential to increase rice yields in Africa	
2005	Modadugu Vijay Gupta	India	For development and dissemination of low-cost techniques for freshwater fish farming	
2006	Edson Lobato	Brazil	For individual efforts in science and policy that opened the Cerrado region of Brazil to agricultural	
2006	Alysson Paolinelli	Brazil	For individual efforts in science and policy that opened the Cerrado region of Brazil to agricultural	
2006	Andrew Colin McClung	United States	For individual efforts in science and policy that opened the Cerrado region of Brazil to agricultural	
2007	Philip E. Nelson	United States	For improving aseptic packaging and spreading the technology worldwide.	
2008	Bob Dole	United States	For leadership towards encouraging global commitment to school feeding	
2008	George McGovern	United States	For leadership towards encouraging global commitment to school feeding	
2009	Gebisa Ejeta	Ethiopia	For developing Africa's first sorghum hybrids resistant to drought and the parasitic witchweed	
2010	David M. Beckmann	United States	For their leadership in two grassroots organisations tackling hunger and nutrition	
2010	Jo Luck	United States	For their leadership in two grassroots organisations tackling hunger and nutrition	
2011	John Kufuor	Ghana	For creating and implementing government policies to alleviate hunger and poverty in their countries	
2011	Luiz Inácio Lula da Silva	Brazil	For creating and implementing government policies to alleviate hunger and poverty in their countries	
2012	Daniel Hillel	Israel	For conceiving and implementing micro-irrigation in arid and dry land regions	
2013	Marc Van Montagu	Belgium	For their individual achievements in modern agricultural biotechnology supporting sustainability and global food security (see controversy (Note: The 2013 award to Chilton, Fraley and Montagu drew criticism from opponents of genetically modified crops. In 2014, three people were arrested who protested the World Food Prize in Des Moines.))	
2013	Mary-Dell Chilton	United States	For their individual achievements in modern agricultural biotechnology supporting sustainability and global food security (see controversy)	
2013	Robert Fraley	United States	For their individual achievements in modern agricultural biotechnology supporting sustainability and global food security (see controversy)	
2014	Sanjaya Rajaram	India; Mexico	For developing 480 varieties of disease resistant wheat and increasing global production by 200 million tons	
2015	Fazle Hasan Abed	Bangladesh	For building an organization that is effective in reducing poverty in Bangladesh and 10 other countries	
2016	Maria Andrade	Cape Verde	For the "single most successful example of biofortification" in the form of biofortified orange-fleshed sweet potato that is resistant, tolerant and high yielding	
2016	Robert Mwanga	Uganda	For the "single most successful example of biofortification" in the form of biofortified orange-fleshed sweet potato that is resistant, tolerant and high yielding	
2016	Jan Low	United States	For the "single most successful example of biofortification" in the form of biofortified orange-fleshed sweet potato that is resistant, tolerant and high yielding	
2016	Howarth Bouis	United States	For "the implementation of a multi-institutional approach to biofortification as a global plant breeding strategy"	
2017	Akinwumi Adesina	Nigeria	For leadership and innovation in building political will to transform African agriculture at all levels	
2018	Lawrence Haddad	United Kingdom; South Africa	For elevating maternal and child malnutrition to a central issue at national and international levels	
2018	David Nabarro	United Kingdom; United Nations	For elevating maternal and child malnutrition to a central issue at national and international levels	
2019	Simon N. Groot	Netherlands	For empowering smallholder farmers in more than 60 countries through enhanced vegetable production	
2020	Rattan Lal	India; United States	For a soil-centric approach to sustainably increasing food production	
2021	Shakuntala H. Thilsted	Trinidad and Tobago; Denmark	For achievements in pioneering fish-based nutrition-sensitive approaches to food systems	
2022	Cynthia Rosenzweig	United States	For her pioneering work in modeling the impact of climate change on food production worldwide	
2023	Heidi Kühn	United States	For her farmer-focused development model that revitalizes farmland, food security, livelihoods and resilience after devastating conflict.	
2024	Cary Fowler	United States	For their extraordinary leadership in preserving and protecting the world's heritage of crop biodiversity and mobilizing this critical resource to defend against threats to global food security.	
2024	Geoffrey Hawtin	United Kingdom; Canada	For their extraordinary leadership in preserving and protecting the world's heritage of crop biodiversity and mobilizing this critical resource to defend against threats to global food security.	
2025	Mariangela Hungria	Brazil	For her extraordinary scientific advancements in biological nitrogen fixation, transforming the sustainability of soil health and crop nutrition for tropical agriculture.	

== Associated events ==
The Foundation has expanded into a number of associated events including the Norman E. Borlaug International Symposium, also known as the World Food Prize Symposium or the Borlaug Dialogue. A Youth Institute was established in 1994 to motivate youngsters in agriculture, food, population and connected sciences. Youth Institutes have been set up in 24 states of the United States, and three other countries. based on essays, high school students are selected to take part in the activities of these institutes. Participation in these institutes also makes one eligible for an eight-week internship program.

The Borlaug-Ruan International Internship provides high school students an eight-week opportunity for a hands-on experience, working with scientists and policymakers in hunger and nutrition at research centres around the world. The internship was founded in 1998 and has funded over 350 Borlaug-Ruan interns who have travelled to 34 agricultural research centres around the world. The Iowa Hunger Summit has taken place during the week of the World Food Prize events since 2007. The event is open to the public and celebrates the role Iowans play in fighting hunger and advancing food security each year.

== See also ==
- List of agriculture awards
