= American Journal of Potato Research =

Scientific journal

- Discipline: Agriculture
- Language: English
- Edited by: Samuel Essah

Publication details
- Former names: Potato News Bulletin (1923–1926); American Potato Journal (1926–1998)
- History: 1980—present
- Publisher: Springer; Potato Association of America
- Frequency: Bimonthly
- Impact factor: 1.8 (2024)

Standard abbreviations
- ISO 4: Am. J. Potato Res.

Indexing
- ISSN: 1099-209X

Links
- Journal homepage; Online access; Online archive

American Journal of Potato Research is a peer-reviewed scientific journal published bimonthly by Springer Science+Business Media on behalf of the Potato Association of America. It covers developments in potato science, including biotechnology, disease and pest research and crop management. Its current editor-in-chief is Samuel Essah (Colorado State University).

The journal was established in 1923 under the name Potato News Bulletin, before being named to American Potato Journal in 1926. Since 1998, it has been published under its current title.

== Abstracting and indexing ==
The journal is abstracted and indexed in:

- Biological Abstracts
- BIOSIS Previews
- Current Contents/Agriculture, Biology & Environmental Sciences
- Ei Compendex
- Inspec
- ProQuest databases
- Science Citation Index Expanded
- Scopus

According to the Journal Citation Reports, the journal has a 2024 impact factor of 1.8.
