= Edson Lobato =

Brazilian soil fertility scientist

Edson Lobato, a Brazilian soil fertility scientist, was awarded the 2006 World Food Prize for his role in helping transform the Cerrado into productive cropland. Adding to the contributions of fellow 2006 World Food Prize Laureates, Dr. A. Colin McClung of the United States, and Alysson Paolinelli of Brazil, Lobato helped make agricultural development possible in the Cerrado, a region named from Portuguese words meaning “closed, inaccessible land.”
