= Jo Luck =

American businesswoman (1941–2025)

Jo Luck (December 5, 1941 – November 26, 2025) was an American businesswoman who was CEO of Heifer International. She was recognized with a World Food Prize in 2010.

== Education ==
Luck attended Hendrix College and earned a degree at David Lipscomb College. She also attended the John F. Kennedy School of Government at Harvard University and Harvard Business School's Executive Education Program.

== Career ==
Luck was the first executive director of the nonprofit Arkansas Advocates for Children and Families in 1978. A year later, then-governor Bill Clinton selected her as the executive director of the Arkansas Department of Parks and Tourism.

She joined Heifer International in 1989, serving as director of International Programs from 1989 to 1992 and president from 1992 to July 2011. From 1979 to 1989, she served as director of the Arkansas Department of Parks and Tourism. She served as a presidential appointee on the Board for International Food and Agricultural Development (BIFAD), the Farm Foundation’s Dialogue on Food and Agriculture for the 21st Century Steering Committee, and the DuPont Advisory Committee on Agriculture Innovation and Productivity, and as chair of the Program Oversight Panel for CGIAR (Consultative Group on International Agriculture Research) Program on Aquatic Agricultural Systems associated with the World Fish Center.

== Later life and death ==
Luck was inducted to the Arkansas Women's Hall of Fame in 2019. She died November 26, 2025, at the age of 83.
