= International Potato Center =

Tuber research institute in Peru

- Centro Internacional de la Papa
- Established: 1971
- Type: Research center
- Headquarters: Lima, Peru
- Location: Lima, Peru
- Coordinates: 12°04′37″S 76°56′46″W
- Leader: Simon Heck
- Parent organization: CGIAR
- Website: cipotato.org

The International Potato Center (known as CIP from its Spanish-language name Centro Internacional de la Papa) is a research facility based in Lima, Peru, that seeks to reduce poverty and achieve food security on a sustained basis in developing countries through scientific research and related activities on potato, sweet potato, other root and tuber crops, and on the improved management of natural resources in the Andes and other mountain areas.

== History ==
The International Potato Center was established in 1971 by decree of the Peruvian government.

In 1991 the World Vegetable Center (WVC) chose to end its sweet potato research. The WVC duplicated and transferred its research and germplasm to the International Potato Center and Taiwan Agricultural Research institute.

CIP is one of the 15 specialized research centers of the Consultative Group on International Agricultural Research, an international consortium of agricultural research organizations, having joined in 1972.

In late 2015, it partnered with NASA to attempt to grow potatoes in a simulated Martian environment. In March 2017, it announced that preliminary indications are positive.

== CIP-Georgia ==
In 2015, CIP began a 3-year project to "Enhance the rural livelihood of Georgia", for which in 2017 the Republic of Austria provided funding, delegated to the Austrian Development Agency, which was extended an additional three years. The project's goal is to "improve the livelihoods of Georgian farmers by increasing profitability and sustainability of their potato crops and to increase capacity of national players in the potato seed value chain."

== Directors ==
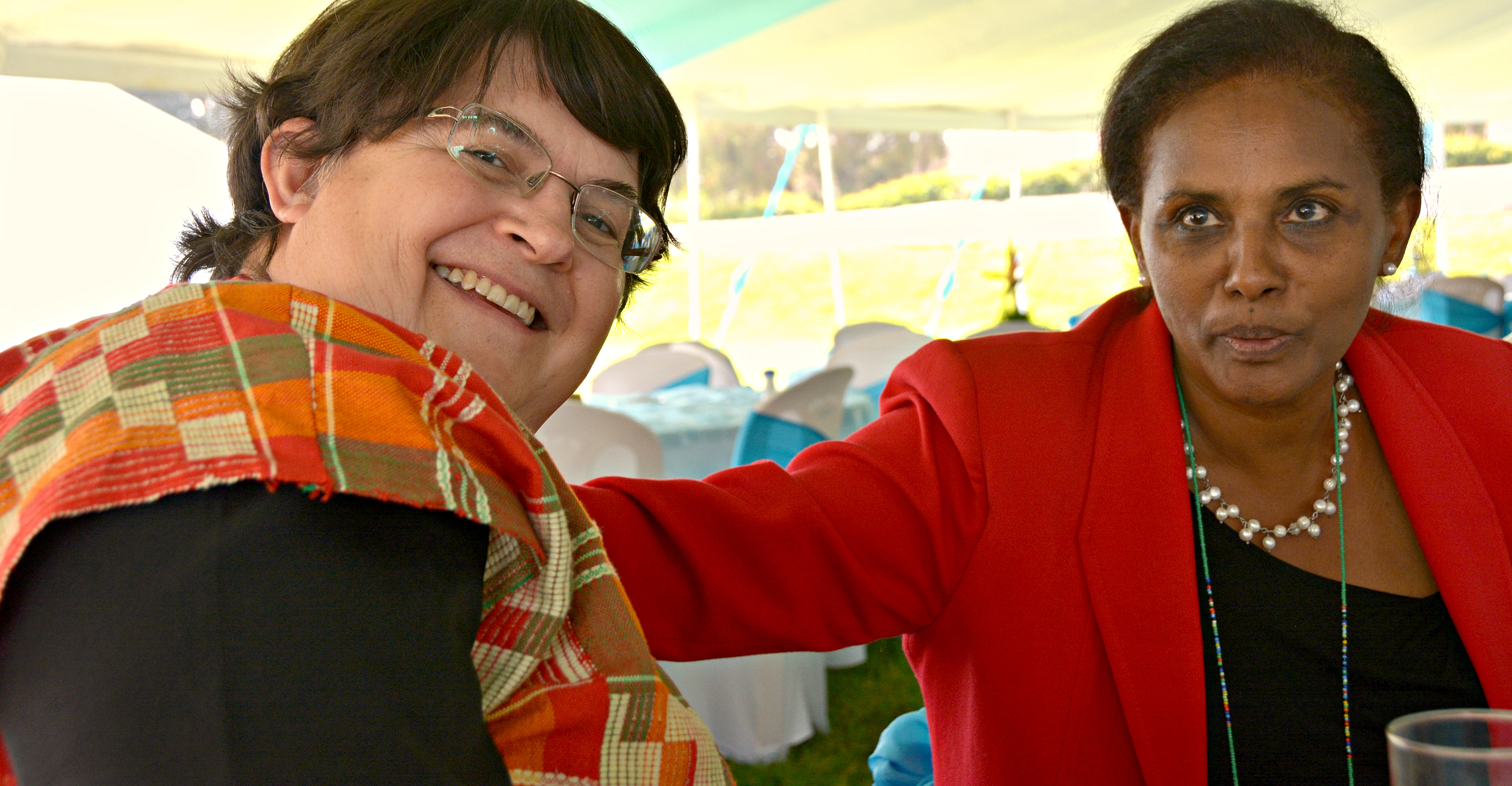
Jan Low, regional director for Africa of the CIP, catches up with Segenet Kelemu, director general of the International Centre of Insect Physiology and Ecology.

- Richard L. Sawyer, founding Director 1971–1991
- Hubert Zandstra, 1991–2004
- Pamela K. Anderson, 2004–2013
- Barbara Wells, 2014
- Simon Heck, 2023
