= Alysson Paolinelli =

Brazilian politician (1936–2023)

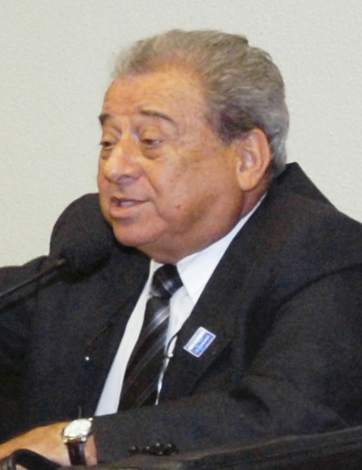

Alysson Paolinelli (10 July 1936 – 29 June 2023) was a Brazilian agronomic engineer and public official who received the 2006 World Food Prize for his role in transforming the Cerrado into productive cropland. Paolinelli was Brazil's Minister of Agriculture from 1974 to 1979.

Paolinelli died on 29 June 2023, at the age of 86.
