= Christine Whelan =

American writer, journalist and clinical professor

Christine B. Whelan
- Born: Christine Barrett Whelan; July 5, 1977 (age 49); New York City, U.S.
- Education: Princeton University; University of Oxford
- Employer: University of Wisconsin-Madison
- Title: Clinical Professor of Consumer Science
- Parent(s): Stephen Whelan, Elizabeth Whelan
- Website: https://www.christinewhelan.com

Christine Barrett Whelan (born July 5, 1977) is an American writer, journalist, and clinical professor at the University of Wisconsin-Madison. She has authored two books about marriage, two self-help books for young adults, and an Audible series about purpose.

== Early life ==
Whelan was born in New York City to attorney Stephen T. Whelan and Elizabeth Whelan, an author and public health specialist.

== Education ==
Whelan earned her undergraduate degree from Princeton University, graduating magna cum laude with a degree in politics. She subsequently was awarded the 1999 Daniel M. Sachs scholarship, granting her direct acceptance to Worcester College within the University of Oxford, where she studied Economic and Social History for her masters and doctorate.

== Academic and consulting roles ==
Whelan has taught in the Sociology department at the University of Iowa, the Sociology and Politics departments at Princeton University, and the Sociology department at the University of Pittsburgh. In 2013, she then moved to the Consumer Science department at the School of Human Ecology at University of Wisconsin-Madison, where she currently teaches and directs the Money, Relationships, and Equality (MORE) initiative.

== Journalism ==
From 1997 through 2000, Whelan interned at The Wall Street Journal in its New York and Washington bureaus, and afterwards interned at The Washington Post. In 2008, Whelan was awarded a Templeton-Cambridge Journalism Fellowship.

Whelan's writing has also appeared in The New York Times, USA Today, National Review Online, and The Huffington Post.

== Publishing ==
Whelan's first book, Why Smart Men Marry Smart Women, was published by Simon & Schuster in October 2006. In the book, Whelan coined the term SWANS, which stands for Strong Women Achievers, No Spouse.

Intended in part as a response to Maureen Dowd's 2005 book Are Men Necessary? When Sexes Collide, Whelan presented evidence contrary to the belief that an elite education and high income among women correlate with lower marriage rates. Using Census Bureau statistics, a commissioned poll of 3,700 men and women ages 25 to 40 and personal interviews, Whelan showed that while the stereotype was valid among previous generations, today a higher income and education in fact increases a woman's marriage chances, and that high-achieving women simply marry later in life.

Prior to conducting the research, Whelan originally intended for the book to be a pessimistic take on the marriage prospects of professional women, drawn from popular studies and personal experience. The book was initially conceived with the title Overqualified for Love.

Whelan's second book, Marry Smart: The Intelligent Woman's Guide to True Love, was published by Simon & Schuster on December 30, 2008. Whelan's third book, Generation WTF: From “What the #%$&” to a Wise, Tenacious, and Fearless You, was published by Templeton Press in February 2011. Whelan's fourth book, The Big Picture: A Guide to Finding Your Purpose in Life, was published in May 2016. In 2021, Whelan recorded an Audible Original lecture series, "Finding Your Purpose," which made the Associated Press Bestseller list for Audible books that March.

== Public appearances ==
Whelan has frequently appeared as an expert commentator on television news programs, including The NewsHour with Jim Lehrer, Good Morning America, and on national radio programs, including Iowa Public Radio, Wisconsin Public Radio, and the BBC.
