= No-Aging Diet =

Diet developed by Benjamin S. Frank

Cover of Dr. Frank's No-Aging Diet

The No-Aging Diet is a high-protein fad diet developed by physician Benjamin S. Frank.

== Overview ==
Frank promoted the diet in his book Dr. Frank's No-Aging Diet, first published in 1976. The book stresses the importance of nucleic acid as a cell builder. The diet advocates the consumption of foods heavy in RNA (ribonucleic acid) such as sardines four times a week, other seafood three times a week, calf's liver, lentils and soybeans.

Frank stated that the diet could slow the aging process and could cure many ailments. He believed that sardines and other foods high in nucleic-acid content can erase wrinkles could make people look fifteen years younger. In 1977, authors Barbara Friedlander and Marilyn Petersen authored Dr. Frank's No-Aging Diet Cookbook. The cook included recipes for nucleic-acid rich foods.

== Criticism ==
The diet is extremely unbalanced and is a health danger to those with hypertension because of the high salt content of the sardines. It has been described as a "dangerous and especially bizarre diet". The book was criticized for false advertising.

There is no scientific evidence that the human body can benefit from extra dietary nucleic acids because during digestion they are destroyed and broken down to simpler compounds. Nutritionists Fredrick J. Stare and Elizabeth Whelan commented that "the particularly ludicrous part of Frank's theory totally ignored in his book is the fact that genetic material is extremely specific. If the nucleic acids of a sardine were to have any direct effect on our bodies, about the most we could expect would be to grow fins and improve our swimming!."

Biochemist Harold A. Harper from University of California noted that the diet "is absolute, sheer quackery. I repeat that statement. It is totally unscientific from A to Z. To anyone who knows the remotest thing about chemistry, [Frank's] theory reads like a comic book."

== See also ==
- High-protein diet
