= The Frankenfood Myth =

2004 book by Henry I. Miller and Gregory Conko

- Author: Henry I. Miller
- Publisher: Praeger Publishers
- Publication date: 2004

The Frankenfood Myth: How Protest and Politics Threaten the Biotech Revolution is a book written by Hoover Institution research fellow Henry I. Miller and Competitive Enterprise Institute fellow Gregory Conko and published by Praeger Publishers published in 2004. In it Conko argues against over-regulation of genetically modified food and it features a foreword by Nobel Peace Prize-winner Norman Ernest Borlaug.

In an interview, Conko described Frankenfood Myth as follows:

"It's not a point-by-point refutation of all the misconceptions that are being spread about agricultural biotechnology. The primary mess that we tackle has to do with an attitude that is being spread by both opponents of biotechnology and by a lot of its supporters that it is somehow uniquely risky and therefore should be subject to special caution and special regulatory oversight."

== See also ==
- Genetically modified food controversies
