= American Council on Science and Health =

American nonprofit organization

Coordinates: 40.7756°N 73.9827°W

- Abbreviation: ACSH
- Formation: 1978
- Founder: Elizabeth Whelan
- Purpose: pro-industry advocacy
- Headquarters: New York City

The American Council on Science and Health (ACSH) is a pro-industry advocacy organization founded in 1978 by Elizabeth Whelan with support from the Scaife Foundation and John M. Olin Foundation. ACSH's publications focus on industry advocacy related to food, nutrition, health, chemicals, pharmaceuticals, biology, biotechnology, infectious disease, and the environment. Its critics have accused it of being a front group for anti-science denialism.

== History ==
The American Council on Science and Health (ACSH) was founded in 1978 by Elizabeth Whelan. In the 1970s, ACSH scientists, saying they were concerned with what they described as the lack of sound scientific basis, common sense, reason, and balance in public forums and public policy regarding such issues as health and the environment, began to produce their own policy statements. In 1981, ACSH decided to start taking some corporate funding, but not for specific projects or programs, only for general support. Over the years, their articles have included such topics as the U.S. Food and Drug Administration (FDA), obesity, chemophobia, phthalates, DDT, fracking, e-cigarettes, GMOs, atrazine, and bisphenol A.

Whelan says she was motivated to found the American Council on Science and Health after doing research for the pharmaceutical company Pfizer about a section of the Food Additives Amendment of 1958 to ban certain chemicals from foods. With further research, she says she found that public discourse and public policy were chemophobic. Her first book, Panic in the Pantry (1976), challenged the notion, popular in the 1970s, that "natural" was better and that "chemicals" were dangerous.

In 1978, along with Frederick J. Stare, founder of the Harvard Nutrition Department, Whelan invited 50 other scientists to "bring the message of sound science to consumers, via the media" in a "consumer education consortium". Their first financial support came from the Scaife Foundation and the John M. Olin Foundation. By 2003, almost 400 scientists had joined ACSH.

In September 2014, Whelan died. She was replaced by Hank Campbell in July 2015. Thom Golab became president in August 2019.

== Issue advocacy ==
=== Chemicals in the environment ===
ACSH frequently advocates against "regulating chemicals without scientific proof of harm." A 2009 editorial by board member Henry I. Miller in Investor's Business Daily criticized the United States Environmental Protection Agency (EPA)'s employment of the precautionary principle to regulate chemicals such as bisphenol-A, phthalates, flame retardants, the herbicide atrazine and fluorinated chemicals used to make Teflon, all of which he described as "important" and "demonstrably safe."

In February 2009, the Consumer Product Safety Improvement Act imposed regulations of several substances and banned the manufacture for sale, distribution in commerce, or import any children's toy or childcare article that contains concentrations of more than 0.1 percent of di-(2-ethylhexyl) phthalate (DEHP), dibutyl phthalate (DBP), or benzyl butyl phthalate (BBP). Michael Kamrin, who was on ACSH's Board of Scientific and Policy Advisors, published a critical review in 2009 in the Journal of Toxicology and Environmental Health, saying that phthalates were "safe." ACSH's advocacy on the issue extends back to 1999, when it worked with former U.S. Surgeon General C. Everett Koop to advocate for the ingredient used in many soft plastics.

=== Food safety and nutrition ===
ACSH has advocated against taxation of foods known to contribute to weight gain as a means to combat obesity. The group opposed New York State's move to require food chains to post calorie information on their products. ACSH has also called for better regulation and testing of dietary supplements.

In a 2009 interview by The Daily Show correspondent Samantha Bee, an ACSH spokesperson criticized the Obama's family's White House Vegetable Garden, calling the Obamas "organic limousine liberals" and calling their promotion of organic food a "public health concern" since not everyone could afford it and also claimed that organic farming would "lead to famine" and said Michelle Obama "should use pesticides in the garden."

=== Diseases and pharmaceuticals ===
ACSH criticized Representative Debbie Wasserman Schultz's Breast Cancer Education and Awareness Requires Learning Young Act as focusing on detection methods that were "not scientifically supported but distracting from more effective measures." The group worked to "clarify" "unclear" messages and dispel "myths" surrounding the swine flu outbreak in 2009. In 2008, ACSH applauded the American Academy of Pediatrics for demanding for an episode of Eli Stone to carry a disclaimer since the show depicted a jury awarding damages based on the claim that a vaccine caused autism. ACSH has long been critical of groups that falsely claim a link between the two.

Following the September 11 attacks on the World Trade Center in 2001, ACSH opposed the appointment of a federal official to oversee and administer aid to those injured during the attacks and subsequent rescue; it argued that such a move would "create another layer of bureaucracy between victims and aid." Also, the group criticized rescue workers who attempted to "fraudulently receive financial compensation but did not suffer injuries."

=== Tobacco ===
In 2008, then associate director Jeff Stier addressed the negative long-term effects of smoking by using the example of Barack Obama during his 2008 campaign. It opposed a New York State law that outlawed certain types of smokeless tobacco because, it argued, that would make it "harder for adult smokers to quit cigarettes." ACSH also criticized Apple Inc. workers who refused to enter homes where smoking had taken place to make technical repairs out of concern over second-hand smoke. ACSH does not support government efforts to ban the sale of e-cigarettes.

In 1980, ACSH co-founder Frederick J. Stare was chairman of ACSH's board of directors and sought funding from US tobacco giant Philip Morris USA for ACSH's activities. He stated that he believed financially supporting ACSH would be to Phillip Morris' benefit.

== Funding ==
The Scaife Foundation and John M. Olin Foundation provided ACSH's first financial support in the 1970s. In her address on the 25th anniversary of ACSH, Whelan noted that their critics such as Phil Donahue and Barbara Walters accused them of being a "surrogate" of the petrochemical industry and a "shill" for the food industry. To appease their critics, ACSH only accepted funding from private foundations for two years. However, as the media continued to indicate that ACSH was industry-supported, the Board decided on a fundraising policy through which "about 40% of ACSH [funding] comes from private foundations, about 40% from corporations, and the rest of the sale of ACSH publications".

As of 2005, they had received $90,000 from ExxonMobil. Whelan told John Tierney of The New York Times in 2007 that "ACSH has a diverse funding base - we receive donations from private foundations and individuals and unrestricted (usually very small) grants from corporations. The fastest-growing segment of our funding base is individual consumers who are sick and tired of the almost daily baseless scares - and they write us checks to help support our work." In 2010, Whelan told The New Yorker that about a third of the organization's $2 million annual budget came from industry.

In 2013, leaked internal financial documents revealed that 58% of the ACSH's donations in the period from July 1, 2012, to December 20, 2012, came from corporations and large private foundations, many of which themselves had ties to industries. Donors included Chevron, Coca-Cola, Bristol-Myers Squibb, Dr Pepper Snapple Group, Bayer Cropscience, Procter & Gamble, Syngenta, 3M, McDonald's and Altria. In addition, the documents revealed that the organization had on numerous occasions directly solicited donations from industry sources on the basis of projected reports on the specific issues in which those companies and industry organizations had such a stake.

== Industry influence ==
ACSH is well known for being a pro-industry group, and the organization's critics have accused it of being biased in favor of industry. In response to such accusations, ACSH claims that "evidence-based science and medicine, sensible health advice, technological progress, and consumer freedom need protection from the nonstop assault of unscientific activist groups".

In 1979, the information director of the FDA said, "Whelan just makes blanket endorsements of food additives. Her organization is a sham, an industry front." In 1980, ACSH co-founder Frederick J. Stare was chairman of ACSH's board of directors and sought funding from US tobacco company Philip Morris USA for ACSH's activities, stating that he believed financially supporting ACSH would be to Phillip Morris' benefit. In the early 1990s, ACSH decided to stop reporting its funding. Their 1991 report shows that many corporations contributed funds. In 1982, the Center for Science in the Public Interest (CSPI), a consumer advocacy group, published a report on ACSH's practices that stated, "ACSH seems to arrive at conclusions before conducting studies. Through voodoo or alchemy, bodies of scientific knowledge are transmogrified into industry-oriented position statements." CSPI director Michael F. Jacobson said of ACSH, "This organization promotes confusion among consumers about what is safe and what isn't. ... ACSH is using a slick scientific veneer to obscure and deny truths that virtually everyone else agrees with."

In a 1992 internal memo by Whelan disclosed by Consumer Reports, Whelan directed her staff to ask McNeil Specialty for $10,000 toward a white paper on sweeteners, and she disclosed that her staff would seek "more CCC [Calorie Control Council] money... to help us get new sweetener booklet out". McNeil Specialty Products (now McNeil Nutritionals) owns the US marketing rights to Splenda, the branded name of the artificial sweetener sucralose; the Calorie Control Council is an industry trade association for producers of artificial sweeteners, fat substitutes, and low-calorie foods. The same memo instructs that staffers give "special attention" to "Mr. McDermott at Searle about meat money".

One notable critic was Ralph Nader who stated that "ACSH is a consumer front organization for its business backers. It has seized the language and style of the existing consumer organizations, but its real purpose, you might say, is to glove the hand that feeds it."

Environmental scientist Haydn Washington and cognitive scientist John Cook have described ACSH in Climate Change Denial: Heads in the Sand as a greenscamming organization, i.e. as one of many groups that are formed to "masquerade as groups concerned about the environment, but actually work against the interests implied in their names".

== Gilbert Ross controversy ==
Gilbert Ross, ACSH's former medical director, served time in federal prison and had his medical license revoked for Medicaid fraud before being hired by ACSH. When news of Ross's misconduct was made public in 2005, ACSH responded by stating on its website that Ross was remorseful for the role he played in the scam, it had occurred during a period of personal and financial hardship, and he had resigned from the fraudulent clinic after seven weeks of employment. His medical license was reinstated in 2001. ACSH identifies Ross as an emeritus advisor.

== See also ==
- Pseudoskepticism
- American Chemistry Council
