= WorldFish =

Malaysian-based organization

- Formation: 1975
- Type: International organization
- Headquarters: Penang, Malaysia
- Region served: Worldwide
- Members: FishBase Consortium
- Parent organization: Consultative Group on International Agricultural Research
- Website: www.worldfishcenter.org

The International Center for Living Aquatic Resources Management (ICLARM), also known as WorldFish, is an international organization working to transform aquatic food systems to reduce hunger, malnutrition, and poverty.

Based in Penang, Malaysia, WorldFish is a member of CGIAR, which unites international organizations engaged in research about food security and has a presence in 20 countries throughout Africa, Asia and the Pacific Region.

WorldFish has introduced technologies to ramp up local aquatic food production through a network of partners. Such innovations include the development of "genetically improved farmed tilapia" (GIFT) and an enhanced strain of Nile tilapia, in support of smallhold aquaculture farmers in the Global South.

== WorldFish research ==
In 2020, WorldFish began to transition from fisheries and aquaculture to a more holistic aquatic foods system approach. The institution shifted towards food systems management to focus on aquatic food value chains from production through consumption, with focuses on climate resilience and environmental sustainability.

== Recognition ==
WorldFish has been recognized for its work in Nile tilapia. WorldFish fisheries scientist Modadugu Vijay Gupta was awarded the World Food Prize for his research on genetically improved farmed tilapia (GIFT) in support of food and nutrition security in food-insecure regions.

Shakuntala Haraksingh Thilsted, a food nutritionist with WorldFish, received the 2021 World Food Prize for her groundbreaking research, critical insights, and landmark innovations in developing holistic, nutrition-sensitive approaches to aquaculture and food systems.

== Impact ==
WorldFish has worked to breed genetically enhanced fast-growing tilapia (GIFT) varieties to raise the productivity and incomes of low-income smallholder farmers. It also works to improve the production of key inputs for aquaculture, specifically fish feed and fingerlings, and links small-scale aquatic food producers with input and output markets.
