= Delia Grace Randolph =

Epidemiologist and a veterinarian

Delia Grace (born 22 February 1967) is an epidemiologist and a veterinarian. Grace joined the University of Greenwich in May 2020 as Professor of Food Safety Systems at the Natural Resources Institute. She is also Joint Appointed Scientist, Animal and Human Health Program at the International Livestock Research Institute (ILRI), Nairobi, Kenya.

== Education ==
Grace is a graduate from several universities: University College Dublin (MVB Veterinary Medicine 1990), University of Edinburgh, Free University of Berlin (PhD veterinary epidemiology), and Cornell University. In 2013, she led work on agriculture associated disease within a CGIAR Research Programme on Agriculture for Nutrition and Health. She has also served as one of the ten members of the HLPE (High Level Panel of Experts) livestock project team. In 2021, she was also a member of an expert panel at the Global Forum for Food and Agriculture, organized by Germany.

She has authored and co-authored over 300 peer-reviewed publications. She has published in medical journals such as The Lancet and The Proceedings of the National Academy of Sciences of the United States of America.

== Awards and honors ==
Grace received the Trevor Blackburn award in September 2014 for her contributions to animal health and welfare and food safety in developing countries. In 2020, she was awarded the UCD Alumni Award in Health and Agriculture Sciences. In August 2022, she received the Peter Ellis award for her contributions to veterinary epidemiology at the 22nd International Symposium of Veterinary Epidemiology and Economics. She was also the winner of the Arrell Global Food Innovation Award for research impact.
