= Rattan Lal =

Indian-American Soil scientist

- Born: 5 September 1944 (age 82); Karyal, West Punjab, British India
- Citizenship: American
- Education: Punjab Agricultural University; Indian Agricultural Research Institute; Ohio State University
- Known for: Sustainable soil management for global food security and mitigation of climate change
- Awards: Glinka World Soil Prize (2018), GCHERA World Agriculture Prize (2018), Japan Prize (2019), Arrell Global Food Innovation Award (2020), World Food Prize (2020), Padma Shri (2021)
- Scientific career
- Workplaces: University of Sydney, Australia 1968-69; International Institute of Tropical Agriculture, Ibadan, Nigeria, 1969-87; The Ohio State University, Columbus 1987-2010.

Rattan Lal (born 5 September 1944) is an Indian-American soil scientist. His work focuses on regenerative agriculture through which soil can help resolve global issues such as climate change, food security and water quality. He is considered a pioneer in soil-centric agricultural management to improve global food security and develop climate-resilient agriculture.

He has received the Padma Shri Award (2021), World Food Prize (2020), Arrell Global Food Innovation Award (2020), the Japan Prize (2019), the GCHERA World Agriculture Prize (2018), and the Glinka World Soil Prize (2018), among others, for his work.

== Early life and education ==
Rattan Lal was born in 1944 in the Punjab region of British India where his family were subsistence farmers on 9 acres of farmland. As Hindus, they had to leave the region during the Partition of India and lived in refugee camps for two years, eventually resettling in India on less than 2 semi-arid acres.

Lal received his B.S. from Punjab Agricultural University, Ludhiana; M.S. from Indian Agricultural Research Institute, New Delhi. He was noticed by an Ohio State professor and was given a scholarship from the Punjab government for travel and funding. In 1968, he received his Ph.D. in soils from the Ohio State University.

== Career and research ==
Lal worked as a senior research fellow with the University of Sydney from 1968 to 1969, and then as a soil physicist at the International Institute of Tropical Agriculture (IITA), Ibadan, Nigeria, from 1970 to 1987. While in Nigeria, Lal discovered that organic carbon and other nutrients disappeared after deforestation and his research centered on mulching, cover crops and no-till farming to bring back the soil components. His research brought international scientists to Nigeria to view his experimental plots. This research earned him the Japan Prize in 2019.

In 1987, he returned to the Ohio State University, where as of 2024 he is a Distinguished Professor of Soil Science as well as founder and Director of the CFAES Rattan Lal Center for Carbon Management and Sequestration (Lal Carbon Center). His work seeks solutions to the challenge of feeding the world's 8 billion people by turning degraded soils back into healthy soils, restoring its carbon and nutrients. His research has impacted agricultural yields, natural resource conservation, and climate change mitigation worldwide. The research models Lal uses indicate that restoring soil health can lead to multiple benefits by 2100. Benefits include doubling the global annual grain yield, decreasing the land area by 30% that is used for grain cultivation, and decreasing fertilizer use. In 2021, he and his team launched the C-FARM research project on carbon farming to provide in-field validation of how soil captures and stores carbon dioxide.

With an h-index over 190 in 2024, more than 1000 refereed journal articles and over 100 books (edited and authored), he is consistently ranked as a top researcher by Clairivate and Research.com. His most cited paper was published in the journal Science in 2004, entitled "Soil carbon sequestration impacts on global climate change and food security" and drew international attention as the first published report on restoring the organic material in soil not only improves soil health but also reduces carbon dioxide in the atmosphere.

Lal served as president of the International Union of Soil Science from 2017 to 2018. He currently serves as Chair in Soil Science and Goodwill Ambassador of to Inter-American Institute for Cooperation on Agriculture (IICA) and with IICA launched the "Living Soils in the Americas" initiative in 2021. In 2022, President Joe Biden appointed Lal to the Board for International Food and Agricultural Development (BIFAD), and in 2023, Lal serves as Chair of Scientific Advisory Board for the Department of Defence (SERDAP/SAB).

== Awards and honors ==
Lal has received Doctor of Science and Honoris Causa degrees from nine universities globally, including India, Norway, Moldova, Germany, and Spain.

- Indian Agricultural Research Institute (IARI), New Delhi, India (2021)
- Amity University, Noida, Uttar Pradesh, India (2020)
- Pontifical Catholic University of Valparaíso, Valparaíso, Chile (2019)
- Gustavus Adolphus College, Saint Peter, MN, USA (2018)
- University of Lleida, Lleida, Spain (2017)
- Technical University of Dresden, Germany (2015)
- Alecu Russo State University of Bălți, Republic of Moldova (2010)
- Norwegian University of Life Sciences, Ås, Norway (2005)
- Punjab Agricultural University, Ludhiana, India (2001)

In 2023, Lal was ranked #1 globally and in the U.S. among Agricultural Scientists (Plant Science and Agronomists) of the world by Research.com (2023, #2 in 2022). Lal was ranked #1 in Agronomy and Agriculture, Environmental Sciences, and at The Ohio State University; #34 Globally for the year 2020 and #73 Globally for career from 1973-2020 among the top 2% of scientists (out of total 8 million scientists) in peer-reviewed research article "A standardized citation metrics author database annotated for scientific field" by Dr. John P. A. Ioannidis of Stanford University (2019, 2020, 2021). He has been consistently ranked as a "Highly Cited Researcher" by Clarivate Analytics, Web of Science (2017, 2018, 2019, 2020, 2021, 2022, 2023). In 2014-2016, Lal was included in the Thomson Reuter's list of most influential scientists in the world. His work has influenced Roger Revelle and Peter Smith.

On June 11, 2020, Professor Lal was named the prestigious World Food Prize recipient. His research diverged from the conventional 1970s soil fertility strategy of heavy reliance on commercial fertilizers. His research led to a better understanding of how no-till farming, cover crops, crop residues, mulching, and agroforestry can restore degraded soils, increasing organic matter by sequestering atmospheric carbon in the soil, and help combat rising carbon dioxide levels in the air. He was lauded by the World Food Prize president Barbara Stinson for "improving the food security and livelihoods of more than 2 billion people and saving hundreds of millions of hectares of natural tropical ecosystems." Lal was awarded the 2019 Japan Prize "for the sustainable soil management for global food security and mitigation of climate change."

His awards include the following:

- Padma Shree Award 2021
- The World Food Prize 2020
- Arrell Global Food Innovation Award 2020
- Japan Prize 2019
- Glinka World Soil Prize 2018
- World Agriculture Prize 2018
- Borlaug Award 2005
- Liebig Medal 2006
