= Arrell Global Food Innovation Award =

International award in food security

- Awarded for: Unique approaches and impacts of work by individuals and organizations around the globe working on food and nutritional security.
- Sponsored by: Arrell Family Foundation, Arrell Food Institute
- Location: Guelph, Ontario, CA
- Presented by: Arrell Food Institute
- Rewards: A commemorative sculpture and a monetary award of CAD$ 100,000
- First award: 2018
- Final award: 2021
- Website: arrellfoodinstitute.ca/awards/

The Arrell Global Food Innovation Award is an international award recognizing the achievements of individuals who have advanced food security around the world through contributions to science or communities. Conceived by the Arrell Family Foundation and established in 2018 with the creation of the Arrell Food Institute at the University of Guelph, two prizes are awarded each year: the first recognizes a researcher, or group of researchers, who has advanced understanding of food production, processing, distribution, consumption, safety and/or human nutrition, with a significant positive impact on society; the second recognizes an individual, or group of individuals, who has contributed to improved nutritional health and/or food security, with a focus on strengthening disadvantaged communities.

Winners receive $100,000 CAD and recognition at the annual Arrell Food Summit.

== Laureates ==
Year	Laureate	Category	Country	Rationale	Citation
2023	Sara Bonham	Researcher	United States; Canada	Creating innovative food products that support human and planetary health.	
2023	Câm Dairy Foods	Organization	Nigeria	Connecting marginalized communities with markets for their dairy products, providing steady income and supporting food security.	
2023	NASA Harvest	Organization	Global	Using satellite-based imaging to understand food production in a war zone, providing evidence to inform global trade decisions.	
2022	Delia Grace Randolph	Researcher	United Kingdom	For unique and transformative impacts on the safety of food systems and public health in developing countries.	
2022	Access Agriculture	Organization	Global	For working directly with community groups to produce and deliver high-quality, farmer-to-farmer training videos that provide informative and relevant content to farmers in small communities	
2021	Shakuntala Haraksingh Thilsted	Researcher	Trinidad and Tobago; Denmark	For research innovation. WorldFish is an international aquatic foods science and innovation entity of CGIAR, the world's largest agricultural research network.	
2021	Food Heritage Foundation	Organization	Lebanon	Strengthening communities through regional issues such as connecting Syrian refugees and their host communities in Lebanon.	
2020	Rattan Lal	Researcher	United States	For improving soil health, and in doing so, increasing food production around the world.	
2020	Appetite for Change	Organization	United States	For using food as a vehicle for building health and social justice in their community	
2020	Community Food Centres Canada	Organization	Canada	Using meals as a catalyst for greater change in the food system.	
2019	Leon Kochian	Researcher	Canada	Research on plant root systems that aims to improve crop yields by understanding the interactions between roots, the soil they live in, and the micro-organisms in the soil	
2019	Food Forward South Africa	Organization	South Africa	Frontline action in facilitating the provision of more than 17.5-million meals each year through its network of food and financial donors.	
2018	Samuel S. Myers	Researcher	United States	Research on the impacts of climate change on food and nutrition.	
2018	Solidaridad	Organization	Netherlands	Efforts to ensure that food is produced in a way that adequately recognizes the role of farmers in feeding a growing global population while respecting the environment and future generations.	

== Adjudicators ==
- Nadia Theodore, Senior Vice President, Maple Leaf Foods
- Lawrence Hadad, executive director, Global Alliance for Improved Nutrition
- Florence Lasbenes, managing director, 4SD
- Adrienne Xavier, acting director, Indigenous Studies, McMaster University

== Community Food Heroes ==
In recognition of outstanding and innovative contributions to making their own communities’ food systems more equitable, nutritious, sustainable and just, the Adjudication Committee for the Arrell Global Food Innovation Awards has also periodically recognized “food heroes.”
2019

- Northern Manitoba Food, Culture, and Community Collaborative
- Lenore Newman, University of the Fraser Valley
- Chef Elijah Amoo Addo, Food for All Africa
- Hiwot Amare Getaneh, Nutrition for Education and Development

2018

- Loaves and Fishes, Nanaimo, British Columbia
- Our Sustenance
- Black Creek Community Farm
