= Glinka World Soil Prize =

- Description: Recognition of direct contributions to soil preservation, food security, and poverty alleviation
- Country: International
- Presented by: Food and Agriculture Organization (FAO) - Global Soil Partnership
- Rewards: USD 15,000 and gold-plated medal
- Website: http://www.fao.org/world-soil-day/glinka-world-soil-prize/en

The Glinka World Soil Prize is an annual prize awarded since 2016 to researchers for their direct contributions to preserving the environment, food security, and poverty alleviation. The winner receives a USD 15000 check and a Glinka gold-plated medal.

The prize is named in honour of the Russian soil scientist Konstantin Glinka (1867-1927). It is awarded by the Global Soil Partnership of the United Nations Food and Agriculture Organization.

== Recipients ==
Year	Name	Nationality
2016	Instituto Geografico Augustin Codazzi	Columbia
2017	Argentine No Till Farmers Association	Argentina
2018	Rattan Lal	USA
2019	Xu Minggang	China
2020	Luca Montanarella	Italian
2021	Lydie-Stella Koutika	Congolese
2022	Ashok Kumar Patra	Indian
2023	Ravendra Naidu	Australian
2024	Land Development Department (LDD)	Thailand
2025	Ganlin Zhang	Chinese

== See also ==
- List of environmental awards
