= Borlaug Global Rust Initiative =

The Borlaug Global Rust Initiative (BGRI - originally named the Global Rust Initiative) was founded in response to recommendations of a committee of international experts who met to consider a response to the threat the global food supply posed by the Ug99 strain of wheat rust. The BGRI was renamed the Borlaug Global Rust initiative in honor of Green Revolution pioneer and Nobel Peace Prize Laureate Dr. Norman Borlaug who worked to establish and lead the Global Rust Initiative.

The BGRI has the overarching objective of systematically reducing the world’s vulnerability to stem, yellow, and leaf rusts of wheat and advocating/facilitating the evolution of a sustainable international system to contain the threat of wheat rusts and continue the enhancements in productivity required to withstand future global threats to wheat.

The organization focuses on addressing global challenges to wheat security through a collaborative network of researchers, policymakers, and agricultural practitioners. Its key objectives include:

- Threat Reduction: Mitigating global vulnerabilities to wheat diseases.
- Productivity Increases: Improving wheat yields and resilience to global threats.
- International Collaboration: Establishing sustainable partnerships to combat wheat-related challenges.
- Farmer Engagement: Working directly with agricultural communities to promote wheat security.
- Capacity Building – Training the next generation of scientists and professionals in wheat research and food security.

== Executive committee ==
- Chair: Jeanie Borlaug Laube

=== Permanent Members ===
- Ronnie Coffman, Cornell University, Vice Chairman of BGRI
- Bram Govaerts, Director General, CIMMYT,
- Himanshu Pathak, Director General, Indian Council of Agricultural Research,
- Aly Abousabaa Director General, ICARDA
- Rémi Nono Womdim, Deputy Director, Plant Production and Protection Division, FAO

=== Rotating Members ===
- John Manners, Director, CSIRO Agriculture
- David Wall, Acting Director Research, Development and Technology, Agriculture and Agri-Food Canada
- Huajin Tang, VP for International Collaboration, China Academy of Agricultural Sciences
- Lene Lange, Director of Research, Aalborg University, Denmark
- Fentahun Mengistu, Director General, Ethiopian Institute for Agricultural Research
- Abd El Moneam El Banna, President, Egyptian Agricultural Research Center
- Eskander Zand, Deputy Minister and Head, Agricultural Research, Education and Extension Organization, Iran
- Eliud Kireger, Director General, Kenya Agricultural and Livestock Research Organization
- Masum Burak, Director General of the General Directorate of Agricultural Research, Turkey
- Iftikhar Ahmad, Chairman, Pakistan Agricultural Research Council
- Jose Costa, Deputy Administrator, Crop Production and Protection, USDA-ARS
- Alvaro Roel, President, INIA, Uruguay
