= Dirk Inzé =

Belgian molecular biologist

- Born: 19 October 1957 (age 68)
- Education: Ghent University
- Known for: Research on plant growth, organ size, and crop productivity
- Awards: Körber European Science Prize (1994); Francqui Prize (2005); GCHERA World Agriculture Prize (2017); AAAS Fellow (2019); Member of Academia Europaea (2020)
- Scientific career
- Fields: Plant biology, Systems biology
- Workplaces: Ghent University; VIB-UGent Center for Plant Systems Biology; French National Institute for Agricultural Research

Dirk Inzé (born 19 October 1957) is a Belgian molecular biologist and professor emeritus at Ghent University (Ghent, Belgium). He received his PhD from Ghent University in 1984 and was appointed professor at Ghent University in 1995. From 2002 to 2023, he was the director of the VIB-UGent Center for Plant Systems Biology.

His research focuses on the molecular networks regulating plant organ growth and crop productivity, particularly in Arabidopsis and maize. He is a member of the European Molecular Biology Organization (EMBO). He was a recipient of the 1994 Körber European Science Prize, the 2005 Francqui Prize in biological and medical sciences, and the 2017 GCHERA World Agriculture Prize. He became a member of Academia Europaea in 2020. He was elected a Fellow of the American Association for the Advancement of Science in 2019.

== Selected publications ==
- Gonzalez, Nathalie; Beemster, Gerrit T. S.; Inzé, Dirk (April 2009). "David and Goliath: what can the tiny weed Arabidopsis teach us to improve biomass production in crops?". Current Opinion in Plant Biology. 12 (2): 157–164. doi:10.1016/j.pbi.2008.11.003. PMID 19119056.
- Skirycz, Aleksandra; Inzé, Dirk (April 2010). "More from less: plant growth under limited water". Current Opinion in Biotechnology. 21 (2): 197–203. doi:10.1016/j.copbio.2010.03.002. PMID 20363612.
