= Elizabeth Whelan =

American epidemiologist (1943–2014)

Elizabeth M. Whelan
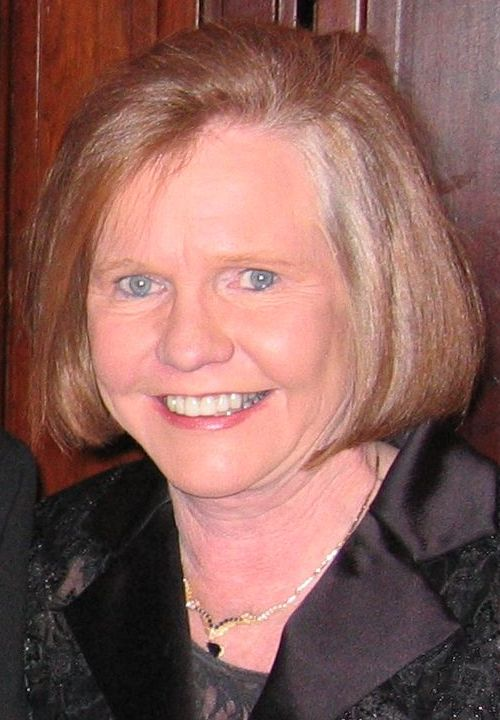
- Whelan in 2003
- Born: December 4, 1943; Manhattan, New York
- Died: September 11, 2014 (aged 70); Manahawkin, New Jersey
- Education: Harvard University
- Scientific career
- Fields: Epidemiology; Food science
- Workplaces: American Council on Science and Health

Elizabeth M. Whelan (/ˈhwiːlən/; December 4, 1943 – September 11, 2014) was an American epidemiologist best known for promoting science that was favorable to industry and for challenging government regulations of consumer products, food, and pharmaceuticals industries that arose from what she said was "junk science." In 1978, she founded the American Council on Science and Health (ACSH) to provide a formal foundation for her work. She also wrote, or co-wrote, more than 20 books and over 300 articles in scientific journals and lay publications.

Whelan's advocacy encompassed numerous high-profile cases, including the Delaney Clause used by the Food and Drug Administration to eliminate use of the sweetener saccharin. She worked to promote industry-friendly science and to suppress the influence of other science on regulators, and was condemned by activists for promoting industry interests, for example with respect to pesticides, growth hormones for dairy cows (rBST), PCBs, hydraulic fracturing, and the proposed limit on soda sizes in New York City. She was critical of many public interest groups that she said "frightened" people away from making personal choices in cases where "no danger had been proved." Whelan disputed whether toxic chemical exposure caused birth defects and health problems at Love Canal and instead claimed without evidence that people were falling ill because of "stress caused by the media."

== Personal ==
Before her marriage, her name was Elizabeth Ann Murphy. Born in Manhattan in 1943, she was the daughter of Marion Barret Murphy and Joseph F. Murphy and had two brothers, Kevin and Brian Murphy. Her father was a lawyer and the Commissioner of Insurance of New Jersey from 1982 to 1984.

Whelan was married to Stephen T. Whelan. They had one child, Christine Whelan, and two grandchildren.

== Education ==
She earned a bachelor's degree from Connecticut College and went on to receive a master's degree in public health from Yale University and both a master's in science and a Ph.D. from Harvard University, in 1971. After graduating Elizabeth Whelan began work studying modern marriages and family relationships. She published several papers on the subject. That work lead to her first book, Sex and sensibility: a new look at being a woman. The next year she published two more, A Baby?... Maybe: A Guide to Making the Most Fateful Decision of Your Life and Making Sense Out of Sex: A New Look at Being a Man. The latter was cowritten with her father-in-law, Stephen T. Whelan Sr., and was meant as a companion to her first book.

== Advocacy ==
After graduating, Whelan began writing on health issues for consumer magazines. She said she became increasingly concerned by the gap between scientific knowledge and public discourse on health related topics. She began writing books as a response. Panic in the pantry: facts & fallacies about the food you buy, published in 1975 and Eat OK--feel OK!: Food facts and your health, published in 1978.

After several years of writing, Whelan, along with her likewise controversial coauthor Frederick J. Stare, said that she created the American Council on Science and Health (ACSH) in 1978 as way of helping scientists reach the public. The ACSH describes itself as a consumer education consortium targeting policy issues with a large scientific component, but critics contend it has a pro-industry bias. It says that one of its goals is to use the media to bring sound science to public debates. Whelan initially invited 50 scientists to the organization. One of the first to respond and a founding director was agronomist Norman Borlaug. The ACSH reported in 2003 that it had grown to nearly 400 scientists.

Whelan continued publishing personally, as well. Some examples include The One-hundred-percent Natural, Purely Organic, Cholesterol-free, Megavitamin, Low-carbohydrate Nutrition Hoax; A smoking gun: how the tobacco industry gets away with murder; and Toxic terror, published in 1983, 1984 and 1985 respectively.
