= Leon Kochian =

American botanist

- Born: San Diego, California, USA
- Awards: Arrell Global Food Innovation Award (2019)

Academic background
- Education: BA, 1978, University of California, Berkeley; PhD, Plant Physiology, 1983, University of California, Davis
- Thesis: The Kinetics, Mechanisms and Localization of K+ Influx in Zea mays Roots (1983)

Leon Vincent Kochian is an American botanist and plant physiologist. He is a Professor and Canada Excellence Research Chair in Food Systems and Security at the University of Saskatchewan. Kochian is a Fellow of the American Association for the Advancement of Science.

== Early life and education ==
Kochian grew up in San Diego, California. He earned his Bachelor of Arts degree in botany from University of California, Berkeley and his PhD in plant physiology from the University of California, Davis (UC Davis). While earning his bachelor's degree, Kochian received a three-year grant from the National Science Foundation for showing "outstanding ability in the field of science."

== Career ==
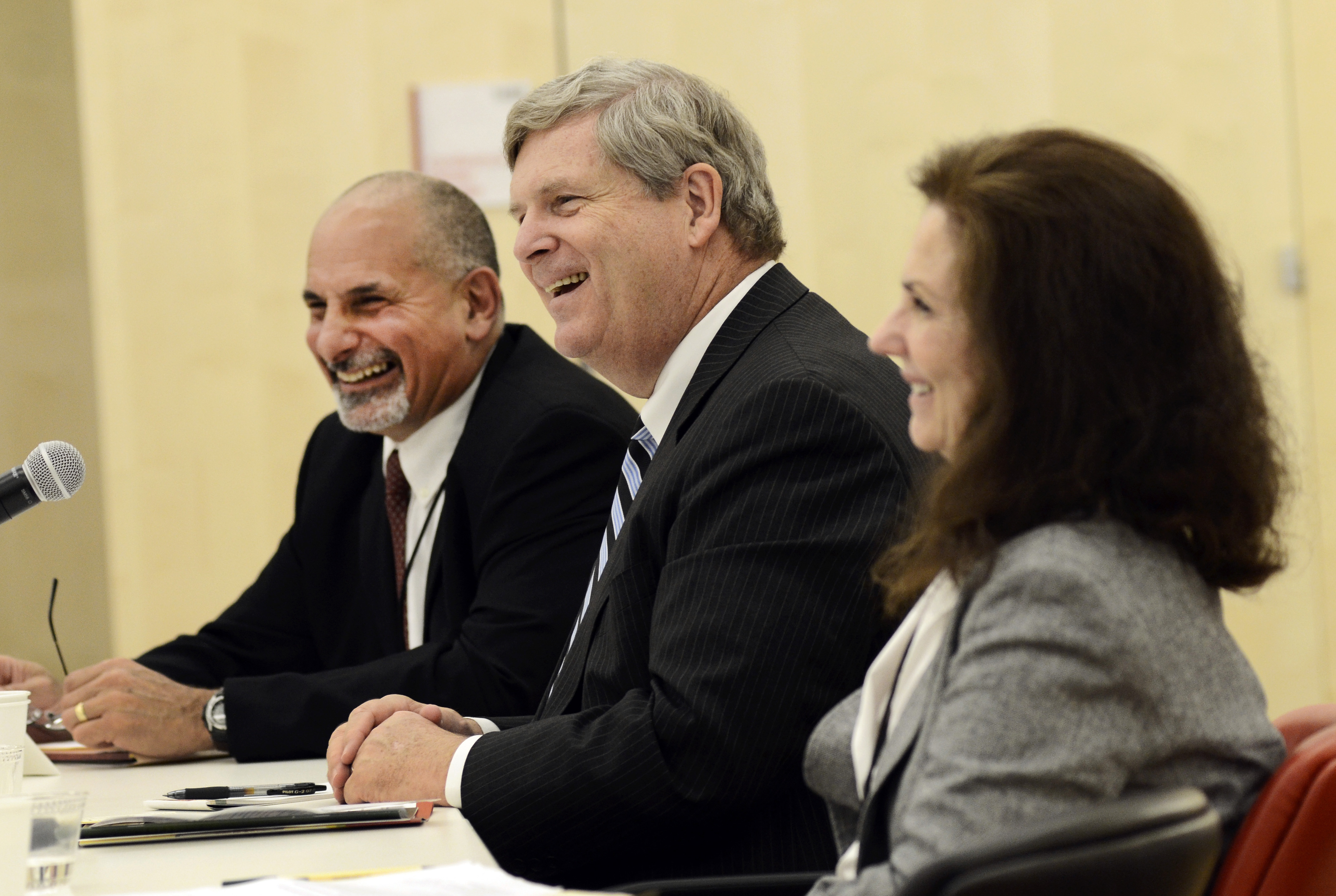
Kochian (left) with United States Secretary of Agriculture Tom Vilsack (middle) in 2014.

Upon completing his PhD, Kochian spent one year as a postdoctoral associate and lecturer at UC Davis. In 1986, Kochian joined the United States Department of Agriculture's (USDA) Plant, Soil and Nutrition Laboratory at Cornell University. His early research at the center focused on using microelectrodes for root ion transport processes. His efforts were recognized in 1990 when he was selected as the Agricultural Research Service's Early Career Scientist in the North Atlantic region. Throughout the 1990s, Kochian focused his research on growing crop plant species in marginal soils and using plants to clean up soils contaminated with heavy metals. He was awarded the 1999 USDA Secretary's Award for Environmental Protection and named the USDA's Outstanding Senior Scientist of the Year in recognition of this research. Kochian was also appointed Director of the Plant, Soil and Nutrition Laboratory.

After receiving a grant from the National Science Foundation, Kochian and his research team cloned a novel aluminum-tolerant gene in sorghum to assist plants in growing in toxic soil. In recognition of his work, Kochian named an inaugural Fellow of the American Society of Plant Biologists and a Fellow of the American Association for the Advancement of Science. In 2015, Kochian was named to the Agricultural Research Service Science Hall of Fame.

Kochian was recruited by the University of Saskatchewan in 2016. Upon joining the school, he was named a Canada Excellence Research Chair in Food Systems and Security and the associate director of the Global Institute for Food Security (GIFS). As the associate director of GIFS, Kochian and his research team focused on identifying phenotypes in crops to genetically engineer crops with better root systems. In recognition of his efforts, Kochian received the 2019 Arrell Global Food Innovation Award.
