= Shakuntala Haraksingh Thilsted =

Winner of 2021 World Food Prize

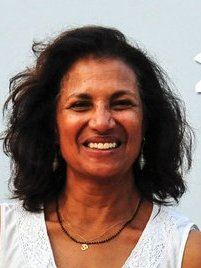
- Born: Shakuntala Haraksingh; 1949 (age 75–76); San Fernando, Trinidad and Tobago
- Known for: Work on nutrition-sensitive approaches to aquatic food systems
- Spouse: Finn Thilsted
- Children: Two
- Awards: Winner of World Food Prize, 2021

Shakuntala Haraksingh Thilsted (born 1949) is a specialist in nutrition-sensitive approaches to aquatic food systems. She is a dual national of Trinidad and Tobago and Denmark. It was announced on 11 May 2021 that she was the winner of the 2021 World Food Prize, the first woman of Asian ancestry to be awarded the prize.

== Early life ==
Thilsted was born in 1949 on Trinidad in the small village of Reform near the town of San Fernando. Her family were descendants of Indian migrants recruited to go to Trinidad to work on sugar plantations. She grew up in a fourth-generation household. As a child she worked in her grandfather’s shop and also helped her mother run the local postal service. She attended Naparima Girls' High School in San Fernando from the age of ten.

Thilsted studied at the University of the West Indies at St. Augustine in Trinidad where she earned a BSc. in Tropical Agriculture in 1971. Subsequently she worked as an agricultural officer in Tobago, a small island north of Trinidad, where she was the first and only woman in the ministry of agriculture, and where she met her husband, Finn Thilsted. After marrying, they moved to his home in Denmark, where she did post-graduate studies, being awarded a PhD in Physiology of Nutrition from the Danish Royal Veterinary and Agricultural University (now part of the University of Copenhagen). She taught at the same university, where she became an associate professor.

== Career ==
Thilsted worked in Bangladesh and Cambodia where she examined the nutritional composition of small native fish species found and consumed in those countries. In Bangladesh she initiated a partnership between the Bangladesh Agricultural University and her university in Denmark. She demonstrated that there were high levels of numerous essential micronutrients and fatty acids in these fish, which could provide significant benefits for the cognitive development of children in their first 1000 days, both through direct consumption and through their mothers’ milk, as well as benefitting the nutrition and health of their mothers. From this research, Thilsted went on to develop nutrition-sensitive approaches and innovations to food production that have improved the nutrition of millions of low-income people. In Cambodia, where most rural people depend on rice field fisheries for income and food, she helped establish rice field ponds to produce fish throughout the dry season.

Thilsted is credited with developing the pond polyculture system, which allows small and large fish species to grow together in ponds, larger areas of water, and rice fields. Contrary to popular belief, small fish did not compete with large fish for space or food. Instead, the polyculture approach increased total productivity by as much as five times This helped to increase the quality, diversity, and quantity of available food in many local communities in Bangladesh and in 2004 the Bangladesh Ministry of Fisheries and Livestock banned the cleaning of ponds and prohibited the use of pesticides to kill naturally occurring fish. Working together with local communities and the private sector Thilsted also promoted the development of affordable, and culturally acceptable, highly nutritional fish-based products, suitable for young children and lactating women. She also discovered that these products helped increase the absorption or bioavailability of other essential micronutrients found in vegetables and rice, such as iron and zinc.

Since 2020, Thilsted has been the Global Lead for Nutrition and Public Health at WorldFish, which is a global CGIAR research centre that has its headquarters in Malaysia. Her research work has led to projects being funded by organizations such as USAID, the African Development Bank, the International Fund for Agricultural Development, UNICEF and the Bill & Melinda Gates Foundation. Thilsted was closely involved in the organization of the UN Food Systems Summit 2021, guiding the Summit's work related to building sustainable and equitable food systems. She is also involved with the Global Action Network in mobilizing activities for the UN Decade of Ocean Science for Sustainable Development (2021–2030) and UN Decade of Action on Nutrition (2016–2025).

== Awards and honours ==
- 2021. Arrell Global Food Innovation Award.
- 2021. World Food Prize. The prize was formally presented on 21 October 2021 in Des Moines, Iowa, USA.
- 2020. Honorary Doctorate in Agricultural Science, Swedish University of Agricultural Sciences
