= Ronnie Coffman =

American plant scientist

- Education: University of Kentucky, Cornell University
- Awards: 2013 World Agriculture Prize; 2019 Fellow AAAS; 2021 Distinguished Award for Meritorious Service from the African Plant Breeders Association
- Scientific career
- Fields: Plant Breeding, Sustainable Agriculture, Food Security, Agronomy
- Workplaces: International Rice Research Institute, Cornell University
- Academic advisors: Norman Borlaug

Ronnie Coffman is an American plant scientist and professor. He is director of numerous research projects dedicated to international agriculture, food security and gender equity in agriculture. He received the World Agriculture Prize in 2013. He was named a 2019 Fellow of the American Association for the Advancement of Science.

== Early life and education ==
Coffman grew up in a farming community in Hopkins County, Kentucky. He received a Bachelor of Science from the University of Kentucky in 1965 and a Master's in Science in 1967. He earned a Ph.D. in plant breeding from Cornell University in 1971. His academic advisor was Norman E. Borlaug, with whom he conducted wheat breeding experiments at CIMMYT in Mexico.

== Career and research ==
In 1969, Coffman joined Norman Borlaug in Mexico as Borlaug's PhD student and was with Borlaug in the field when he was notified he had won the Nobel Peace Prize. From 1971 to 1980 he worked at the International Rice Research Institute in the Philippines. Coffman adopted strategies learned from Borlaug and applied them to rice breeding. Rice germplasm bred by Coffman would be cultivated on millions of hectares, mainly in Asia. He is credited with leading the reorganization of IRRU in the 1970s to fuse plant breeding expertise with other scientific disciplines. At IRRI, he established the International Rice Testing Program to trial new varieties in diverse environments across Asia.

"This kind of scientific collaboration is standard now. but it represented an innovation in distributed data collection that was far ahead of its time," said rice geneticist Susan McCouch, the Barbara McClintock Professor of Plant Breeding and Genetics at Cornell University. Coffman joined the faculty of Cornell University in 1981. As chair of the Department of Plant Breeding in the 1980s, he expanded the department's international activities in research, teaching, and extension.

Coffman took on leadership roles at the College of Agriculture and Life Sciences in the 1990s, and in 2001 was named Director of International Programs. As director, he initiated multiple research programs concerned with improving a diverse array of staple crops. He served as principal investigator on grant-funded projects totaling more than $250 million.

In 2005, Coffman, Borlaug and global partners released a report detailing the threat to global wheat supplies posed by the stem rust variant Ug99. The report sounded the alarm to risks facing wheat supplies in Kenya, Ethiopia and nearby wheat-growing regions. The scientists warned that the spread of Ug99 could be devastating to world wheat supplies, especially in resource-poor areas of Africa, the Middle East and Asia.

Heeding the warning, the Bill & Melinda Gates Foundation provided $27 million in funding to establish the Borlaug Global Rust Initiative. As vice-chair of the BGRI, Coffman led efforts to bring together more than 2,500 scientists from 35 international institutions in 23 countries into a global collaborative community. The BGRI has received more than $100 million in funding from the Bill & Melinda Gates Foundation and the United Kingdom's Foreign, Commonwealth and Development Office. Since 2008, the BGRI's partner institutions have released over 270 rust resistant wheat varieties in 11 at-risk countries: Afghanistan, Bangladesh, Bhutan, Egypt, Ethiopia, Kenya, India, Iran, Nepal, Pakistan, and Sudan.

Development projects led by Coffman have integrated plant breeding with diverse disciplines, include plant pathology, genomic selection and gender awareness.

As principal investigator for NextGen Cassava, he has supported efforts to modernize cassava breeding in sub-Saharan Africa.

In 2022, he was elected professor emeritus of plant breeding and genetics at Cornell's School of Integrative Plant Science.

== Honors and awards ==
Coffman was awarded the International Agronomy Award in 2005 from the American Society of Agronomy for his contributions in research, teaching, and extension work outside the United States.

In 2013, Coffman was awarded the inaugural World Agriculture Prize.

Coffman is a Fellow of the American Association for the Advancement of Science (2019).

From 2016 to 2020, Coffman served as the Andrew H. & James S. Tisch Distinguished University Professor at Cornell University. The Tisch professorship is awarded to senior faculty who are recognized as leaders in their field.

Coffman was awarded the 2011 Women in Science Mentoring Award from the Crop Science Society of America. The award recognizes efforts to encourage women and girls in the sciences.

In 2021 he was awarded the Distinguished Award for Meritorious Service from the African Plant Breeders Association.
