= World Agriculture Prize =

International agriculture and life sciences award

- Awarded for: Distinguished contributions by academics to higher education, research, innovation, and outreach in the agricultural and life sciences
- Presented by: Global Confederation of Higher Education Associations for the Agricultural and Life Sciences (GCHERA)
- First award: 2013
- Website: www.gchera.com/world-agriculture-prize.html

The GCHERA World Agriculture Prize is an international award established by the Global Confederation of Higher Education Associations for the Agricultural and Life Sciences (GCHERA). First awarded in 2013, the prize recognizes academics and faculty members whose work has strengthened education, research, innovation, and outreach in the agricultural and life sciences. The official GCHERA laureates list includes recipients from 2013 through 2021. GCHERA announced the relaunch of the prize for 2026, with two prizes of US$100,000 to be awarded.

== Laureates ==
| Year | Laureates | Country | Institution | Ref |
|---|---|---|---|---|
| 2021 | Marc Van Montagu | Belgium | Ghent University | |
| 2021 | Mitiku Haile | Ethiopia | Mekelle University | |
| 2020 | Zhang Fusuo | China | China Agricultural University | |
| 2020 | Pamela Ronald | USA | University of California, Davis | |
| 2019 | Jose Miguel Aguilera | Chile | Pontificia Universidad Católica de Chile | |
| 2018 | Eric Danquah | Ghana | University of Ghana | |
| 2018 | Rattan Lal | USA | Ohio State University | |
| 2017 | Dirk Inzé | Belgium | Vlaams Instituut voor Biotechnologie | |
| 2016 | Lorne Babiuk | Canada | University of Saskatchewan | |
| 2015 | Paul Singh | USA | University of California-Davis | |
| 2014 | Paul Vlek | Germany | Bonn University | |
| 2013 | Ronnie Coffman | USA | Cornell University | |
