= Are Men Necessary? =

2005 book by Maureen Dowd

Are Men Necessary? When Sexes Collide
- Author: Maureen Dowd
- Language: English
- Subject: Gender Studies, Women
- Genre: Non-fiction
- Publisher: Putnam Publishing Group
- Publication date: November 8, 2005
- Publication place: United States
- Media type: Print Paperback
- Pages: 338
- ISBN: 0-399-15332-2
- OCLC: 61353155
- Dewey Decimal: 305.3/0973/090511 22
- LC Class: HQ1075.5.U6 D68 2005

Are Men Necessary? When Sexes Collide is a book written by American author and The New York Times columnist Maureen Dowd. The book was not well received by critics, unlike her previous book Bushworld: Enter at Your Own Risk.

== Overview ==
The book described the state of feminism, whether women's pursuit of a mate is worthy, and the belief that smart women were relegated to the home with only domestic duties. Are Men Necessary? dealt with cultural analysis and was a memoir of sexual politics along with modern gender relations. Dowd gave her personal view of Hillary Clinton, arguing that she destroyed feminism, betrayed other women by sticking with her "dissembling, thong-seeking, wife-betraying husband", and became a feminist icon in the process.

== Reviews ==
- NPR Fresh Air: Interview of Maureen Dowd (2005-11-09)
- Bill Thompson's Eye on Books interview:
- CNN:"If Maureen Dowd was trying to cause controversy, she's done a good job." (2005-11-15)
- New York Magazine:"The Redhead and the Gray Lady" by Ariel Levy (2005-10-28)
- "Scary screeds about Maureen Dowd, written by threatened men". Salon. Archived from the original on June 6, 2011.
- Slip Sliding Away: Maureen Dowd's Are Men Necessary? stirs up stagnant feminist movement by Felicia Feaster
- Metacritic "Are Men Necessary?" by Maureen Dowd (archived 2006-11-13)
- Entertainment Weekly "Are Men Necessary? When Sexes Collide" Book review, (2005-11-09)
- Traister, Rebecca (November 8, 2005). "Yes, Maureen Dowd is necessary". Salon. Archived from the original on August 8, 2007.
- The Nation "The World According to Dowd" (2005-11-28)
- Haussegger, Virginia (February 22, 2006). "Why do women hate Maureen Dowd?". The Age.
- BookReporter.com:
- Cica, Natasha (March 11, 2006). "Are Men Necessary?". The Age.
- Wall Street Journal article
