= Maureen Dowd =

American journalist (born 1952)

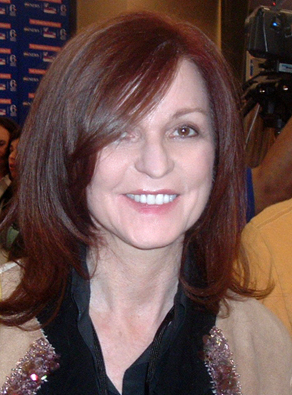
- Dowd in 2008
- Born: Maureen Brigid Dowd; January 14, 1952 (age 74); Washington, D.C., U.S.
- Education: Catholic University of America (B.A.)
- Occupation: Journalist
- Years active: 1974–present
- Employers: The Washington Star (1974–1981); Time (1981–1983); The New York Times (1983–present)

Maureen Brigid Dowd (/daʊd/; born January 14, 1952) is an American columnist for The New York Times and an author.

During the 1970s and early 1980s, Dowd worked for The Washington Star and Time, writing news, sports and feature articles. She joined The New York Times in 1983 as a metropolitan reporter, and became an op-ed writer in 1995. Dowd became a staff writer for The New York Times Magazine in 2014. In 1999, Dowd received a Pulitzer Prize for her series of columns on the Clinton–Lewinsky scandal.

Dowd's columns often explore politics, Hollywood, and gender-related topics. Her writing style has been compared to political cartoons in its exaggerated satire of politics and culture. Some have criticized her writings on female public figures, particularly Monica Lewinsky and Hillary Clinton, as sexist.

During the 2016 presidential election, Dowd penned a New York Times op-ed, titled "Donald the Dove, Hillary the Hawk", which was frequently referenced by critics of Donald Trump's foreign policy when he took actions contrary to the narrative put forth by Dowd.

== Early life and career ==
Dowd was born the youngest of five children in Washington, D.C. Her mother, Margaret "Peggy" (née Meenehan), was a housewife, and her father, Mike Dowd, worked as a Washington, D.C., police inspector. In 1969, Dowd graduated from Immaculata High School. In 1973, she received a B.A. in English from the Catholic University of America.

Dowd entered journalism in 1974 as a dictationist for the Washington Star, where she later became a sports columnist, metropolitan reporter, and feature writer. When the Star closed in 1981, Dowd worked for Time. In 1983, Dowd joined The New York Times, initially as a metropolitan reporter. Dowd began serving as a correspondent in the Times Washington bureau in 1986. In 1987, after being tipped off by Jeffrey Lord, she broke the story that Delaware Senator Joe Biden had plagiarized several speeches from other politicians. The revelation was the first in a cascading series of damaging stories that ultimately ended Biden's first presidential campaign.

In 1991, Dowd received a Breakthrough Award from Columbia University. In 1992, she became a Pulitzer Prize finalist for national reporting, and in 1994 she won a Matrix Award from the New York Association for Women in Communications.

== New York Times columnist ==
Dowd became a columnist on The New York Times op-ed page in 1995, replacing Anna Quindlen. Dowd was named a Woman of the Year by Glamour magazine in 1996, and won the 1999 Pulitzer Prize, for distinguished commentary. She won the Damon Runyon Award for outstanding contributions to journalism in 2000, and became the first Mary Alice Davis Lectureship speaker (sponsored by the School of Journalism and the Center for American History) at the University of Texas at Austin in 2005. In 2010, Dowd was ranked No. 43 on The Daily Telegraph's list of the 100 most influential liberals in America; in 2007, she was ranked No. 37 on the same list.

Dowd's columns have been described as letters to her mother, whom friends credit as "the source, the fountain of Maureen's humor and her Irish sensibilities and her intellectual take." Dowd herself has said, "She is in my head in the sense that I want to inform and amuse the reader." Dowd's columns are distinguished by an acerbic, often polemical writing style. Her columns display a critical and irreverent attitude towards powerful, mostly political, figures such as former Presidents George W. Bush and Bill Clinton. She also tends to refer to her subjects by nicknames. For example, she has often referred to Bush as "W" and former Vice President Dick Cheney as "Big Time"; and she has called former President Barack Obama "Spock" and "Barry."

Her interest in candidates' personalities earned her criticism from some early in her career, such as this: "She focuses too much on the person but not enough on policy."

Because Dowd perceives her columns to be an exploration of politics, Hollywood, and gender-related topics, she often uses popular culture to support and metaphorically enhance her political commentary. For instance, in a Times video debate she said of the North Korean government that "you could look at a movie like Mean Girls and figure out the way these North Koreans are reacting," drawing out a similarity between their reaction and high school girls with nuclear weapons who just wanted attention.

Dowd's columns have also been described as often being political cartoons that capture a caricatured view of the current political landscape with precision and exaggeration. For example, in the run-up to the 2000 presidential election she wrote that Democratic candidate "Al Gore is so feminized and diversified and ecologically correct that he's practically lactating," while referring to the Democratic Party as the "mommy party." In a Fresh Dialogues interview years later, she said of Gore:

I was just teasing him a little bit because he was so earnest and he could be a little righteous and self important. That's not always the most effective way to communicate your ideas, even if the ideas themselves are right. I mean, certainly his ideas were right but he himself was—sometimes—a pompous messenger for them.

In January 2014, Dowd recounted that after eating about one-fourth of a cannabis-infused chocolate bar while touring the legalized recreational cannabis industry, she was later told she should have only eaten one-sixteenth—but that this had not been in the instructions on the label. She went on to describe her negative experiences with legal cannabis in a June 3, 2014 New York Times op-ed, following up on this story in another op-ed in September 2014, this time describing a discussion of using consumable cannabis with her "marijuana Miyagi" Willie Nelson.

On March 4, 2014, Dowd published a column about the dominance of men in the film industry in which she quoted Amy Pascal, co-chairman of Sony Pictures Entertainment. According to BuzzFeed, "leaked emails from Sony" suggested that Dowd had promised to provide the draft column to Pascal's husband, Bernard Weinraub, prior to the column's publication. BuzzFeed said the column "painted Pascal in such a good light that she engaged in a round of mutual adulation with Dowd over email after its publication." Both Dowd and Weinraub have denied that Weinraub ever received the column. On December 12, 2014, Times public editor Margaret Sullivan concluded, "While the tone of the email exchanges is undeniably gushy, I don't think Ms. Dowd did anything unethical here."

In August 2014, it was announced that Dowd would become a staff writer for The New York Times Magazine. Her first article under the new arrangement was published more than a year later.

=== Controversial portrayals of Monica Lewinsky, Hillary Clinton and Donald Trump ===
Dowd has been accused of sexism by Clark Hoyt, then-public editor of The New York Times. A 2017 study which examined sexualized shaming of Monica Lewinsky in mainstream news coverage stated that in Dowd's extensive writings about Lewinsky, she repeatedly "mocked and disparaged her." A 2009 study of sexism towards Hillary Clinton and Sarah Palin in the 2008 election observed that Dowd had disparaged Palin as a "Barbie" over her pageantry past.

Other commentators have criticized Dowd for being obsessed with Bill and especially Hillary Clinton. During the 2008 Democratic primary, Dowd published an article titled "Can Hillary Clinton Cry Herself Back to the White House?", which a 2016 study said "[serves] to reinforce the stereotype that tears and visible emotions are feminine traits and signs of weakness". She also published a column where she likened former Senator Clinton to the "Terminator", a ruthless cyborg where "unless every circuit is out, she'll regenerate enough to claw her way out of the grave"; in 2013 Jessica Ritchie, a research assistant at the University of Leicester, argued that portrayals such as these sought to portray Clinton and her presidential bid as improper and unnatural. According to Clark Hoyt, Dowd's columns about Clinton were "loaded with language painting her as a 50-foot woman with a suffocating embrace, a conniving film noir dame and a victim dependent on her husband". A 2014 analysis by the advocacy group Media Matters of 21 years of Dowd's columns about Hillary Clinton found that of the 195 columns by Dowd since November 1993 containing significant mentions of Clinton, 72 percent (141 columns) were negative towards Clinton.

During the 2016 presidential election, Dowd penned a New York Times op-ed, titled "Donald the Dove, Hillary the Hawk". She argued that Donald Trump held dovish foreign policy beliefs, citing his purported opposition to the 2003 U.S. invasion of Iraq. However, before the publication of the op-ed, it had been reported that Trump did, in fact, support the invasion, and there were no statements on the record opposing it. In 2018, Daniel W. Drezner, professor of international politics at the Fletcher School of Law and Diplomacy at Tufts University, wrote that Trump's foreign policy was clearly hawkish and stated, "Yes, I'm extremely angry. I have no right to ask that anyone who told you in 2016 that Trump was going to be the more dovish president should probably not talk about foreign policy for a good long while. But dear God, it would be nice." Throughout Trump's presidency, critics of his foreign policy referenced the Dowd op-ed, claiming that many of the actions taken by Trump were entirely inconsistent with the narrative put forth by Dowd.

During the 2020 presidential election, Dowd wrote a column about Geraldine Ferraro, which initially—and incorrectly—stated that the last time a man and a woman ran on the Democratic ticket was the Mondale–Ferraro ticket, which led Clinton to joke that "either Tim Kaine and [she] had a very vivid shared hallucination four years ago or Maureen had too much pot brownie before writing her column again". The New York Times later corrected the column to say that 1984 was the last time a male Democratic presidential candidate chose a woman as his running mate.

== Personal life ==
Dowd is single but formerly dated Aaron Sorkin, the creator and producer of The West Wing. She was also involved with actor Michael Douglas and her fellow New York Times columnist John Tierney.

Sorkin referred to Dowd's influence on the Hill as the fictional Times reporter "Karen Cahill" on The West Wing season 2, episode 11, "The Leadership Breakfast", along with Washington Post's Ben Bradlee and Sally Quinn.

== Honors ==
In 2004, Dowd received the Golden Plate Award of the American Academy of Achievement, presented by Awards Council member Neil Sheehan at the International Achievement Summit in Chicago.

In 2012, NUI Galway awarded her an honorary doctorate.

In addition to winning a Pulitzer Prize in 1999 for Commentary, she was also a finalist in 1992 for National Reporting.

== Bibliography ==
External videos
- Booknotes interview with Dowd on Bushworld, August 8, 2004, C-SPAN
- Book party for Bushworld, September 13, 2004, C-SPAN
- Washington Journal interview with Dowd on Are Men Necessary?, November 18, 2005, C-SPAN
- Presentation by Dowd on Are Men Necessary?, November 19, 2005, C-SPAN
- Q&A interview with Dowd on The Year of Voting Dangerously, October 16, 2016, C-SPAN
- Presentation by Dowd on The Year of Voting Dangerously, November 15, 2016, C-SPAN
- Interview with Dowd on The Year of Voting Dangerously, March 12, 2017, C-SPAN

- Dowd (2004). Bushworld: Enter at Your Own Risk. G. P. Putnam's Sons. ISBN 978-0-425-20276-0.
- Dowd (2005). Are Men Necessary? When Sexes Collide. Putnam. ISBN 978-0-7553-1550-5.
- Dowd, Maureen (2016). The Year of Voting Dangerously: The Derangement of American Politics. Twelve. ISBN 978-1455539260.

== See also ==
- New Yorkers in journalism
