= Henry I. Miller =

American medical researcher and columnist

Henry Miller
- Miller in April 2014
- Born: July 1, 1947 (age 79); Philadelphia, Pennsylvania, U.S.
- Occupations: Doctor and author

Henry I. Miller (born July 1, 1947) is an American medical researcher and columnist, formerly with the FDA, and from 1994 until 2018 the Robert Wesson Fellow in Scientific Philosophy and Public Policy at Stanford University's Hoover Institution, a public policy think tank located on the university's campus in California. He is an Adjunct Fellow of the Competitive Enterprise Institute.

== Career ==
He was educated at MIT (B.S. in Life Sciences) and the University of California, San Diego (M.Sc. and M.D.) and was a resident and Clinical Fellow in Medicine at Harvard's Beth Israel Hospital in Boston. He performed research on gene organization and expression as a Research Fellow in the laboratory of Philip Leder M.D. at the National Institutes of Health.

Miller was a civil servant for fifteen years at the US Food and Drug Administration (FDA) (1979–94). He was the medical reviewer for the first genetically engineered drugs to be evaluated by the FDA and was the "medical officer in charge of Humulin [human insulin] at the F.D.A." during its New Drug Application review in 1982. From 1985 to 1989, he was a special assistant to the FDA commissioner and from 1989 to 1993, the founding director of the FDA's Office of Biotechnology.

He has been an Adjunct Fellow at the Competitive Enterprise Institute. He was a trustee of American Council on Science and Health.

In 2017 it was reported that an article published (in 2015) on the Forbes website by Miller, under his own name, had been drafted by Monsanto. As reported by the New York Times, Monsanto asked Miller to write an article rebutting the findings of the International Agency for Research on Cancer that had classified glyphosate as probably carcinogenic to humans. He had indicated willingness “if I could start from a high-quality draft.” On discovering this, Forbes removed his blog from Forbes.com and ended their relationship with him.

== Positions ==
=== Tobacco-related debates ===
In a 1994 APCO Associates public relations strategy memo to help Phillip Morris organize a global campaign to fight tobacco regulations, Henry Miller was referred to as "a key supporter" and as a potential recruit.

In 2012, in the context of arguing for harm reduction strategies, Miller wrote that "nicotine ... is not particularly bad for you in the amounts delivered by cigarettes or smokeless products. The vast majority of the health risks from tobacco come from the burning and inhalation of smoke. Quitting tobacco altogether remains the ideal outcome, but switching to lower-risk products would be a boon to the health of smokers."

=== Organic farming ===
In a 2014 opinion piece in The Wall Street Journal, Miller disputes the notion that organic food production is a sustainable way to feed the planet's expanding population. He argues that the available evidence does not support claims that organic farming improves nutritional intake, reduces vulnerability to climate change, or enhances biodiversity.

=== Mehmet Oz ===
In 2015, Miller coordinated a letter from a group of 10 physicians to Columbia University, demanding that Columbia's College of Physicians and Surgeons remove Mehmet Oz as a professor of surgery, alleging that Oz's public commentary on health issues had "misled and endangered" the public, and claiming that Oz showed "disdain for science and for evidence-based medicine... for personal financial gain." Oz defended his work, said that he lacked conflicts of interest, and questioned the motivations of Miller and his other critics, saying that they had "big ties to big industry." Columbia defended Oz, citing the principle of academic freedom and faculty members' freedom of expression.

== Selected publications ==
Books

- Miller, Henry I. To America's Health: A Proposal to Reform the Food and Drug Administration. Stanford, Calif: Hoover Institution Press, 2000. ISBN 9780817999025
- Miller, Henry I. Policy Controversy in Biotechnology: An Insider's View. Austin, Tex: R.G. Landes, 1997. ISBN 9781570594083
- Miller, Henry I, and Gregory P. Conko. The Frankenfood Myth: How Protest and Politics Threaten the Biotech Revolution. Westport, Conn: Praeger, 2004. ISBN 0275978796
- Miller, Henry I. Is the Biodiversity Treaty a Bureaucratic Time Bomb? Stanford, Calif.: Hoover Institution on War, Revolution and Peace, Stanford University, 1994. ISBN 9780817956127

Research articles

- Penhoet, E.; Miller, H.I.; Doyle, M.; Blatti, S. (1971). "RNA-dependent RNA polymerase in influenza virions". Proceedings of the National Academy of Sciences USA. 68 (6): 1369–71. doi:10.1073/pnas.68.6.1369. PMC 389191. PMID 5288388. [The first description of this essential flu enzyme.]
- Miller, H.I.; Konkel, D.A.; Leder, P. (1978). "An intervening sequence of the mouse beta-major globin gene shares extensive homology only with beta-globin genes". Nature. 275 (5682): 772–774. doi:10.1038/275772a0. PMID 568218. S2CID 4174336.
- Miller, H.I.; et al. (1997). "A Model Protocol to Assess the Risk of Agricultural Introductions". Nature Biotechnology. 15 (9): 845–848. doi:10.1038/nbt0997-845. PMID 9306396. S2CID 949181.
- Miller, Henry I. Germline Gene Therapy: Don't Let Good Intentions Spawn Bad Policy. Issues in Science & Technology, Spring 2016 (in press).
- Rappuoli, Rino; Miller, Henry I.; Falkow, Stanley (2002). "The intangible value of vaccination". Science. 297 (5583): 937–939. doi:10.1126/science.1075173. PMID 12169712. S2CID 167136358.
- Green, Melvin H.; Miller, Henry I.; Hendler, Sheldon (1971). "Isolation of a polyoma-nucleoprotein complex from infected mouse-cell cultures". Proceedings of the National Academy of Sciences. 68 (5): 1032–1036. Bibcode:1971PNAS...68.1032G. doi:10.1073/pnas.68.5.1032. PMC 389107. PMID 4324998.
- Miller, Henry I.; Riggs, Arthur D.; Gill, Gordon N. (1973). "Ribonuclease H (Hybrid) in Escherichia coli IDENTIFICATION AND CHARACTERIZATION". Journal of Biological Chemistry. 248 (7): 2621–2624. doi:10.1016/S0021-9258(19)44152-5. PMID 4572736.

Articles and Op-Eds

- Henry I. Miller, "Genetic Catastrophes: A Tale of Science, Medicine and Suffering" Forbes. Mar. 23, 2016.
- John J. Cohrssen and Henry I. Miller, "The U.S. Is Botching the Zika Fight". Wall Street Journal., Mar. 13, 2016.
- Henry I. Miller, "What Politicians Should Learn About Vaccination,". . National Review. Sep. 19, 2015.
- Henry I. Miller and Drew L. Kershen. "The Colossal Hoax Of Organic Agriculture". Forbes. JUL 29, 2015.

He is a columnist for Project Syndicate, which translates his articles into as many as 12 languages and submits them to its syndicate of more than 500 newspapers and other publications.

Miller regularly appears on the nationally syndicated radio programs of John Batchelor and Lars Larson.

== Awards ==
- Henry I. Miller award for Excellence in Public Health Education, from the American Council on Science and Health in 2008.
- One of Scientific American's Worldview 100

Described as a "vocal proponent of the free market", he was shortlisted in 2006 (in the Society and ethics category) by the editors of "Nature Biotechnology" as one of the people who had made the "most significant contributions" to biotechnology during the previous decade.
