= Fredrick J. Stare =

American nutritionist and teacher (1910–2002)

- Born: April 11, 1910; Columbus, Wisconsin, U.S.
- Died: April 4, 2002 (aged 91); Wellesley, Massachusetts, U.S.
- Education: University of Wisconsin
- Alma mater: University of Chicago
- Known for: One of the country's most influential teachers of nutrition
- Scientific career
- Fields: Nutrition
- Institutions: Harvard School of Public Health

Fredrick John Stare (April 11, 1910 – April 4, 2002) was an American nutritionist regarded as one of the country's most influential teachers of nutrition.

== Life and career ==
Stare was born in Columbus, Wisconsin, and educated in chemistry and medicine at the University of Wisconsin and the University of Chicago. In the aftermath of the Second World War he worked in the Netherlands, devising a dietary regime to cope with the malnutrition facing the Dutch population.

In 1942, Stare founded the Department of Nutrition at Harvard School of Public Health, which he led as a professor of nutrition until his retirement in 1976. He was a firm believer in the essential goodness of the typical American diet, holding that "prudence and moderation" was the key to healthy eating. As an adviser to the US government, Stare rejected the idea that 'the American diet' was harmful; stating for example that Coca-Cola was "a healthy between-meals snack" and that eating even great amounts of sugar would not cause health problems. He was also a leading campaigner for fluoridation, which his critics suggested was part and parcel of his endorsement of sugar.

Stare was critical of fad diets and claims of alternative medicine. He died of complications from prostate cancer and cardiovascular disease in 2002, in Wellesley, Massachusetts.

== Controversy ==
In his autobiography, Adventures in Nutrition, Stare states that in 1960 he obtained a grant of $1,026,000 from General Foods for the "expansion of the School’s Nutrition Research Laboratories" and that in the 44-year period as a nutritionist he raised a total of $29,630,347. For instance, Kellogg's funded $2 million to set up the Nutrition Foundation at Harvard. The foundation was independent of the university and published a journal Nutrition Reviews that Stare edited for 25 years.

Stare also co-founded and served as chairman of the Board of Directors for the American Council on Science and Health. In 1980, during his tenure as Chairman, he sought funding from US tobacco giant Philip Morris USA for ACSH's activities.

== Selected publications ==
- Panic in the Pantry: Facts & Fallacies About the Food You Buy (with Stephen Barrett and Elizabeth Whelan, 1975)
- The One Hundred Percent Natural, Purely Organic, Cholesterol-Free, Megavitamin, Low-Carbohydrate Nutrition Hoax (1983, with Elizabeth Whelan)
- Fad-Free Nutrition (1998, with Elizabeth Whelan)
- Adventures in Nutrition: An Autobiography (1991)

== See also ==
- Sugar industry
- D. Mark Hegsted
- John Yudkin
