= Norman Borlaug =

American agronomist and Nobel Laureate (1914–2009)

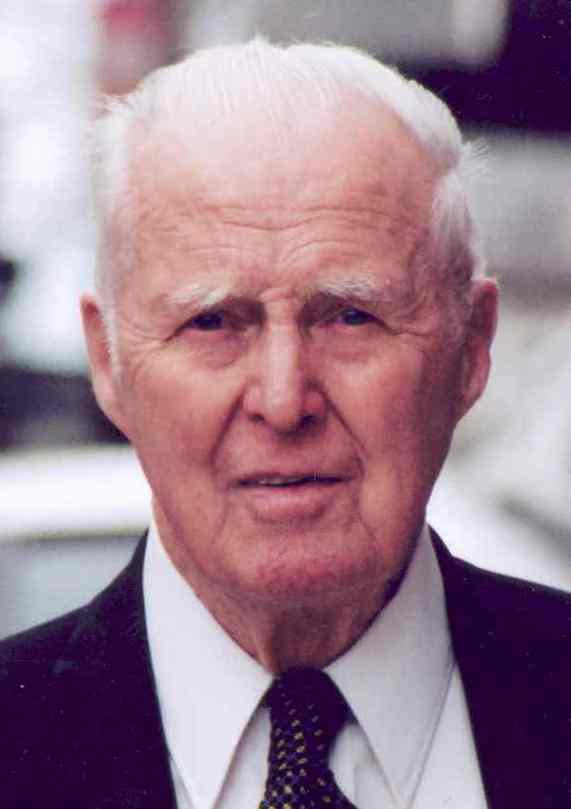
- Borlaug in 2004
- Born: Norman Ernest Borlaug; March 25, 1914; Saude, Iowa, U.S.
- Died: September 12, 2009 (aged 95); Dallas, Texas, U.S.
- Education: University of Minnesota (BS, MS, PhD)
- Known for: Green Revolution; World Food Prize
- Awards: Nobel Peace Prize (1970); Order of the Aztec Eagle (1970); Presidential Medal of Freedom (1977); Vannevar Bush Award (2000); Public Welfare Medal (2002); National Medal of Science (2004); Congressional Gold Medal (2006); Padma Vibhushan (2006)
- Scientific career
- Fields: Agronomy; Plant pathology; Genetics
- Workplaces: DuPont; Cooperative Wheat Research and Production Program (Mexico); International Maize and Wheat Improvement Center; Texas A&M University; University of Minnesota; Cornell University
- Thesis: Variation and Variability in Fusarium lini (1942)
- Doctoral advisor: Jonas Jergon Christensen
- Other academic advisors: Elvin C. Stakman

Norman Ernest Borlaug (/ˈbɔːrlɔːɡ/; March 25, 1914 – September 12, 2009) was an American agronomist who led initiatives worldwide that contributed to the extensive increases in agricultural production termed the Green Revolution. Borlaug was awarded multiple honors for his work, including the Nobel Peace Prize, the Presidential Medal of Freedom, and the Congressional Gold Medal, one of only seven people to have received all three awards.

Borlaug received his B.S. in forestry in 1937 and PhD in plant pathology and genetics from the University of Minnesota in 1942. He took up an agricultural research position with CIMMYT in Mexico, where he developed semi-dwarf, high-yield, disease-resistant wheat varieties. During the mid-20th century, Borlaug led the introduction of these high-yielding varieties combined with modern agricultural production techniques to Mexico, Pakistan, and India. As a result, Mexico became a net exporter of wheat by 1963. Between 1965 and 1970, wheat yields nearly doubled in Pakistan and India, greatly improving the food security in those nations.

Borlaug is often called "the father of the Green Revolution", and is credited with saving over a billion people worldwide from starvation. According to Jan Douglas, executive assistant to the president of the World Food Prize Foundation, the source of this number is Gregg Easterbrook's 1997 article "Forgotten Benefactor of Humanity." The article states that the "form of agriculture that Borlaug preaches may have prevented a billion deaths". Dennis T. Avery also estimated that the number of lives saved by Borlaug's efforts to be one billion. In 2009, Josette Sheeran, then the Executive Director of the World Food Programme, stated that Borlaug "saved more lives than any man in human history". He was awarded the 1970 Nobel Peace Prize in recognition of his contributions to world peace through increasing food supply.

Later in his life, he helped apply these methods of increasing food production in Asia and Africa. He was also an accomplished wrestler in college and a pioneer of wrestling in the United States, being inducted into the National Wrestling Hall of Fame for his contributions.

== Early life, education, and family ==
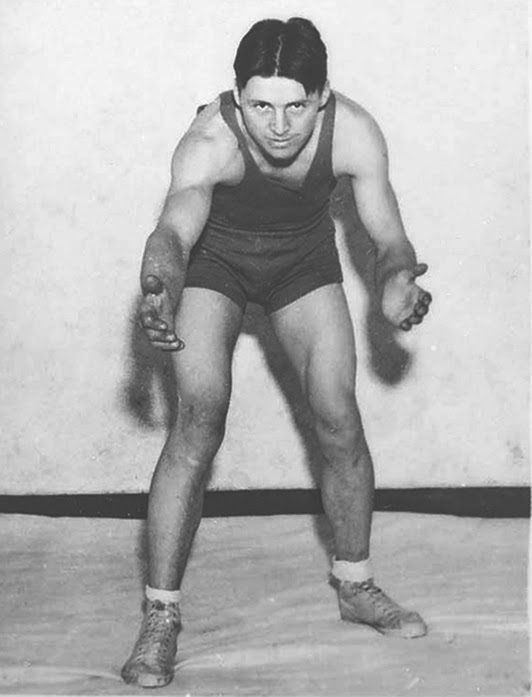
Norman Borlaug wrestling at the University of Minnesota,1933

Borlaug was the great-grandchild of Norwegian immigrants to the United States. Ole Olson Dybevig and Solveig Thomasdatter Rinde, of Feios, a small village in Vik kommune, Sogn og Fjordane, Norway, emigrated to Dane County, Wisconsin, in 1854. The family eventually moved to the small Norwegian-American community of Saude, near Cresco, Iowa. There, they were members of the Saude Lutheran Church, where Norman was baptized and confirmed.

Borlaug was the first of four children born to Henry Oliver (1889–1971) and Clara (Vaala) Borlaug (1888–1972) on his grandparents' farm in Saude in 1914. His three sisters were Palma Lillian (Behrens; 1916–2004), Charlotte (Culbert; 1919–2012), and Helen (b. d. 1921). From age seven to nineteen, he worked on the 106-acre (43 ha) family farm west of Protivin, fishing, hunting, and raising corn, oats, timothy-grass, cattle, pigs, and chickens. He attended the one-teacher, one-room New Oregon #8 rural school in Howard County through eighth grade. Today, the school building, built in 1865, is owned by the Norman Borlaug Heritage Foundation as part of "Project Borlaug Legacy". At Cresco High School, Borlaug was a member of the football, baseball and wrestling teams; his wrestling coach, Dave Barthelma, continually encouraged him to "give 105%".

Borlaug attributed his decision to leave the farm and pursue further education to his grandfather's urgent encouragement to learn: Nels Olson Borlaug (1859–1935) once told him, "You're wiser to fill your head now if you want to fill your belly later on." When Borlaug applied for admission to the University of Minnesota in 1933, he failed its entrance exam. He was accepted at the school's newly created two-year General College. After two quarters, he transferred to the College of Agriculture's forestry program. As a member of the University of Minnesota men's wrestling team, Borlaug reached the Big Ten semifinals. He promoted the sport to Minnesota high schools in exhibition matches all around the state:

Wrestling taught me some valuable lessons [...] I always figured I could hold my own against the best in the world. It made me tough. Many times, I drew on that strength. It's an inappropriate crutch, perhaps, but that's the way I'm made.

To finance his studies, Borlaug put his education on hold periodically to earn income, as he did in 1935 as a leader in the Civilian Conservation Corps, working with the unemployed on federal projects. Many of the people who worked for him were starving. He later recalled, "I saw how food changed them. All of this left scars on me". From 1935 to 1938, before and after receiving his Bachelor of Science in forestry in 1937, Borlaug worked for the United States Forest Service at stations in Massachusetts and Idaho. He spent one summer in the middle fork of Idaho's Salmon River, the most isolated piece of wilderness in the nation at that time.

In the last months of his undergraduate education, Borlaug attended a Sigma Xi lecture by Elvin Charles Stakman, a professor and soon-to-be head of the plant pathology group at the University of Minnesota. Stakman, in his speech entitled "These Shifty Little Enemies that Destroy our Food Crops", discussed the manifestation of the plant disease rust, a parasitic fungus that feeds on phytonutrients in wheat, oats, and barley crops. Stakman had discovered that special plant breeding methods produced plants resistant to rust. His research greatly interested Borlaug, and when Borlaug's job at the Forest Service was eliminated due to budget cuts, he asked Stakman whether he should pursue forest pathology. Stakman advised him to focus on plant pathology instead. He subsequently enrolled at the university to study plant pathology under Stakman. Borlaug earned a Master of Science degree in 1940 and a Ph.D. in plant pathology and genetics in 1942.

Borlaug was a member of the Alpha Gamma Rho fraternity. While in college, he met a co-worker who would become his future wife, Margaret Gibson, while waiting tables at a coffee shop in the university's Dinkytown. They were married in 1937 and had three children, Norma Jean "Jeanie" Laube, Scotty (who died from spina bifida soon after birth), and William; five grandchildren, and six great-grandchildren. On March 8, 2007, Margaret Borlaug died at the age of 95 following a fall. They had been married for 69 years. Borlaug resided in Dallas the last years of his life, although his global humanitarian efforts left him with only a few weeks per year to spend there.

== Career ==
From 1942 to 1944, Borlaug was employed as a microbiologist at DuPont in Wilmington, Delaware. It was planned that he would lead research on industrial and agricultural bacteriocides, fungicides, and preservatives; following the December 7, 1941, attack on Pearl Harbor, Borlaug tried to enlist in the military, but was refused entry under wartime labor regulations, as his lab and personnel were tasked to conduct research for the United States armed forces. One of his first projects was to develop glue that could withstand the warm salt water of the South Pacific. The Imperial Japanese Navy largely controlled the seas around the island of Guadalcanal, and patrolled the sky and sea by day. The only way for U.S. forces to supply the troops stranded on the island was to approach at night by speedboat and jettison boxes of canned food and other supplies into the surf to wash ashore. The problem was that the glue holding these containers together disintegrated in saltwater. Within weeks, Borlaug and his colleagues had developed an adhesive that resisted corrosion, allowing food and supplies to reach the stranded Marines. Other tasks included work with camouflage, canteen disinfectants, DDT to control malaria, and insulation for small electronics.

In 1940, the Avila Camacho administration took office in Mexico. The administration's primary goal for Mexican agriculture was to augment the nation's industrialization and economic growth. U.S. Vice President-Elect Henry Wallace, who was instrumental in persuading the Rockefeller Foundation to work with the Mexican government in agricultural development, saw Avila Camacho's ambitions as beneficial to U.S. economic and military interests. The Rockefeller Foundation contacted E.C. Stakman and two other leading agronomists. They developed a proposal for a new organization, the Office of Special Studies, which would be part of the Mexican Government but directed by the Rockefeller Foundation. It was to be staffed with both Mexican and US scientists, focusing on soil development, maize and wheat production, and plant pathology.

Stakman chose Dr. Jacob George "Dutch" Harrar as project leader. Harrar immediately set out to hire Borlaug as head of the newly established Cooperative Wheat Research and Production Program in Mexico; Borlaug declined, choosing to finish his war service at DuPont. In July 1944, after rejecting DuPont's offer to double his salary, and temporarily leaving behind his pregnant wife and 14-month-old daughter, he flew to Mexico City to head the new program as a geneticist and plant pathologist.

In 1964, Borlaug was made the director of the International Wheat Improvement Program at El Batán, Texcoco, on the eastern fringes of Mexico City, as part of the newly established Consultative Group on International Agricultural Research's International Maize and Wheat Improvement Center (Centro Internacional de Mejoramiento de Maíz y Trigo, or CIMMYT). Funding for this autonomous international research training institute, developed from the Cooperative Wheat Research Production Program, was undertaken jointly by the Ford and Rockefeller Foundations and the Mexican government.

Besides his work in the field of genetic resistance against crop loss, Borlaug felt that pesticides, including DDT, had more benefits than drawbacks for humanity and advocated publicly for their continued use. He continued to support pesticide use despite the severe public criticism he received. Borlaug mostly admired the work and personality of Rachel Carson but lamented her Silent Spring, which he saw as an inaccurate portrayal of the effects of DDT.

Borlaug officially retired from the position in 1979, but remained a CIMMYT senior consultant. In addition to taking on charitable and educational roles, he continued to be involved in plant research at CIMMYT on wheat, triticale, barley, maize, and high-altitude sorghum.

In 1981, Borlaug became a founding member of the World Cultural Council.

In 1984, Borlaug began teaching and conducting research at Texas A&M University. Eventually, he was a Distinguished Professor of International Agriculture at the university and held the Eugene Butler Endowed Chair in Agricultural Biotechnology.

He publicly advocated for agricultural biotechnology as he had for pesticides in earlier decades despite heavy criticism.

Borlaug served on the faculty of the University of Minnesota, University of Iowa, Cornell University, and Texas A&M University. Borlaug remained at A&M until his death in September 2009.

== Wheat research in Mexico ==
The Cooperative Wheat Research Production Program, a joint venture by the Rockefeller Foundation and the Mexican Ministry of Agriculture, involved research in genetics, plant breeding, plant pathology, entomology, agronomy, soil science, and cereal technology. The goal of the project was to boost wheat production in Mexico, which at the time was importing a large portion of its grain. Plant pathologist George Harrar recruited and assembled the wheat research team in late 1944. The four other members were soil scientist William Colwell; maize breeder Edward Wellhausen; potato breeder John Niederhauser; and Norman Borlaug, all from the United States. During the sixteen years Borlaug remained with the project, he bred a series of remarkably successful high-yield, disease-resistant, semi-dwarf wheat.

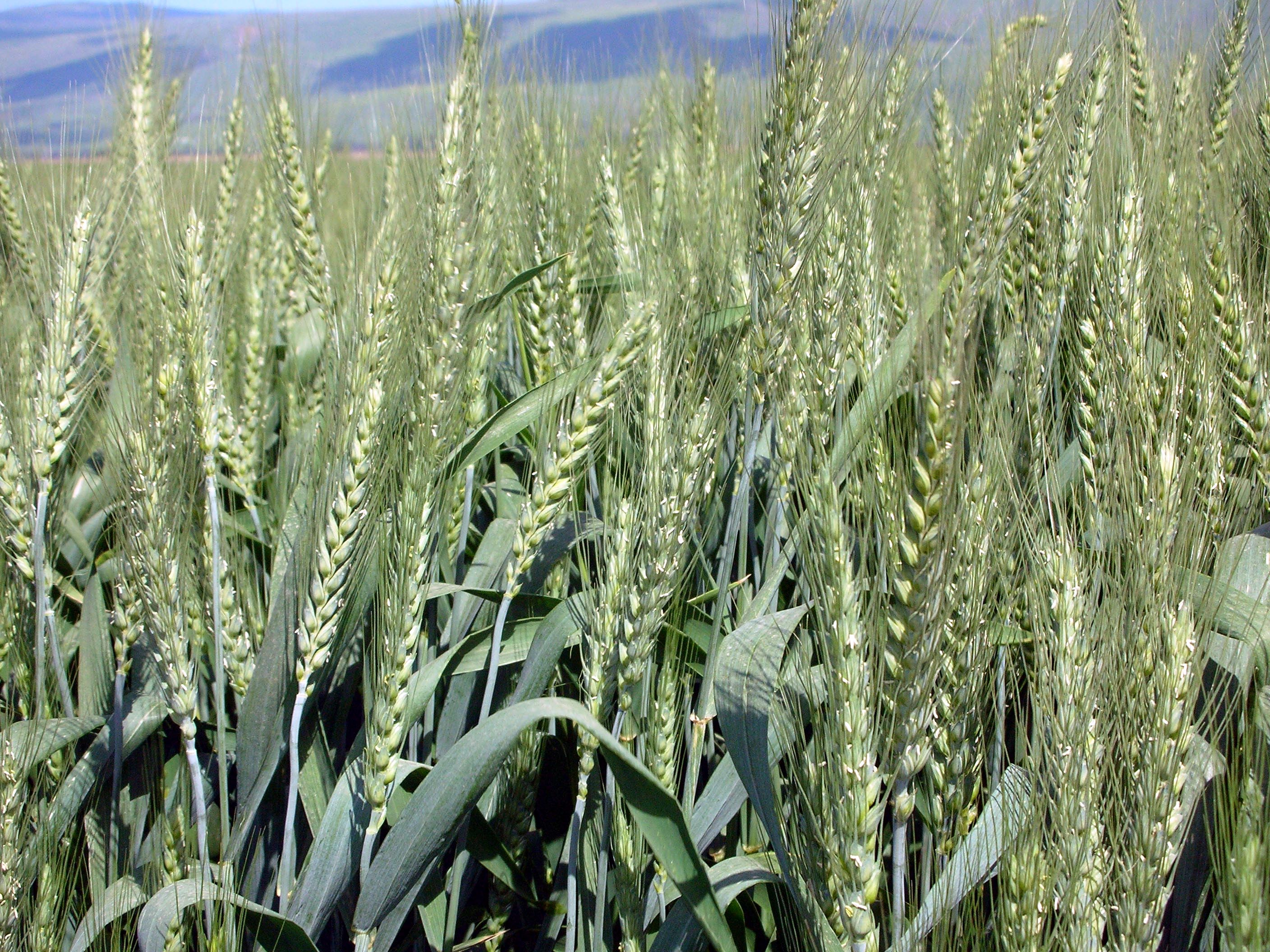
Wheat is the third most-produced cereal crop.

Borlaug said that his first few years in Mexico were difficult. He lacked trained scientists and equipment. Local farmers were hostile towards the wheat program because of serious crop losses from 1939 to 1941 due to stem rust. "It often appeared to me that I had made a dreadful mistake in accepting the position in Mexico," he wrote in the epilogue to his book, Norman Borlaug on World Hunger. He spent the first ten years breeding wheat cultivars resistant to disease, including rust. In that time, his group made 6,000 individual wheat crossings.

=== Double harvest season ===
Initially, Borlaug's work had been concentrated in the central highlands, in the village of Chapingo near Texcoco, where the problems with rust and poor soil were most prevalent. The village never met its aims. He realized that he could speed up breeding by taking advantage of the country's two growing seasons. In the summer, he would breed wheat in the central highlands as usual, then immediately take the seeds north to the Valle del Yaqui research station near Ciudad Obregón, Sonora. The difference in altitudes and temperatures would allow more crops to be grown each year.

Borlaug's boss, George Harrar, was against this expansion. Besides the extra costs of doubling the work, Borlaug's plan went against a then-held principle of agronomy that has since been disproved. It was believed that to store energy for germination before planting, seeds needed a rest period after harvesting. When Harrar vetoed his plan, Borlaug resigned. Elvin Stakman, who was visiting the project, calmed the situation, talking Borlaug into withdrawing his resignation and Harrar into allowing the double wheat season. As of 1945, wheat would then be bred at locations 700 miles (1,000 km) apart, 10 degrees apart in latitude, and 8,500 feet (2600 m) apart in altitude. This was called "shuttle breeding".

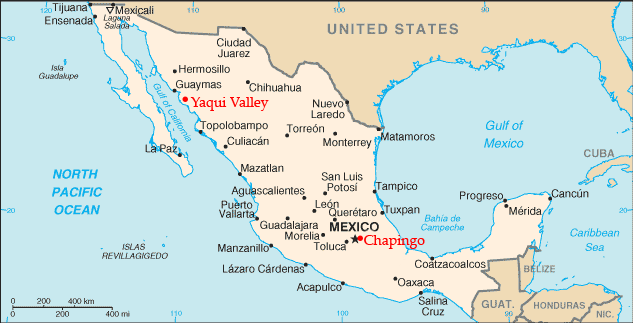
Locations of Borlaug's research stations in the Yaqui Valley and Chapingo

As an unexpected benefit of the double wheat season, the new breeds did not have problems with photoperiodism. Normally, wheat varieties cannot adapt to new environments due to variable sunlight. Borlaug later recalled, "As it worked out, in the north, we were planting when the days were getting shorter, at low elevation and high temperature. Then we'd take the seed from the best plants south and plant it at high elevation, when days were getting longer, and there was lots of rain. Soon, we had varieties that fit the whole range of conditions. That wasn't supposed to happen by the books". This meant that the project would not need to start separate breeding programs for each geographic region of the planet.

=== Disease resistance through varieties of wheat ===
Because purebred (genotypically identical) plant varieties often only have one or a few major genes for disease resistance, and plant diseases such as rust are continuously producing new races that can overcome a pure line's resistance, multiple linear lines varieties were developed. Multiline varieties are mixtures of several phenotypically similar pure lines, each of which has different genes for disease resistance. By having similar heights, flowering and maturity dates, seed colors, and agronomic characteristics, they remain compatible with each other, and do not reduce yields when grown together on the field.

In 1953, Borlaug extended this technique by suggesting that several pure lines with different resistance genes should be developed through backcross methods using one recurrent parent. Backcrossing involves crossing a hybrid and subsequent generations with a recurrent parent. As a result, the genotype of the backcrossed progeny becomes increasingly similar to that of the recurrent parent. Borlaug's method would allow the various disease-resistant genes from several donor parents to be transferred into a single recurrent parent. To ensure each line has different resistant genes, each donor parent is used in a separate backcross program. Between five and ten of these lines may then be mixed, depending on the types of pathogens present in the region. As this process is repeated, some lines will become susceptible to the pathogen. These lines can easily be replaced with new resistant lines.

As new sources of resistance become available, new lines are developed. In this way, crop loss is kept to a minimum because only one or a few lines become susceptible to a pathogen within a given season, and all other crops are unaffected by the disease. Because the disease would spread more slowly than if the entire population were susceptible, this also reduces the damage to susceptible lines. There is still the possibility that a new race of pathogen will develop to which all lines are susceptible, however.

=== Dwarfing ===
Dwarfing is an important agronomic quality for wheat; dwarf plants produce thick stems. The cultivars Borlaug worked with had tall, thin stalks. Taller wheat grasses better compete for sunlight but tend to collapse under the weight of the extra grain—a trait called lodging—from the rapid growth spurts induced by nitrogen fertilizer Borlaug used in the poor soil. To prevent this, he bred wheat to favor shorter, stronger stalks that could better support larger seed heads. In 1953, he acquired a Japanese dwarf variety of wheat called Norin 10 developed by the agronomist Gonjiro Inazuka in Iwate Prefecture, including ones which had been crossed with a high-yielding American cultivar called Brevor 14 by Orville Vogel. Norin 10/Brevor 14 is semi-dwarf (one-half to two-thirds the height of standard varieties) and produces more stalks and thus more heads of grain per plant. Also, larger amounts of assimilate were partitioned into the actual grains, further increasing the yield. Borlaug crossbred the semi-dwarf Norin 10/Brevor 14 cultivar with his disease-resistant cultivars to produce wheat varieties that were adapted to tropical and sub-tropical climates.

Borlaug's new semi-dwarf, disease-resistant varieties, called Pitic 62 and Penjamo 62, dramatically changed the potential yield of spring wheat. By 1963, 95% of Mexico's wheat crops used the semi-dwarf varieties developed by Borlaug. That year, the harvest was six times larger than in 1944, the year Borlaug arrived in Mexico. Mexico had become fully self-sufficient in wheat production and was a net wheat exporter. Four other high-yield varieties were also released in 1964: Lerma Rojo 64, Siete Cerros, Sonora 64, and Super X.

== Expansion to South Asia: the Green Revolution ==
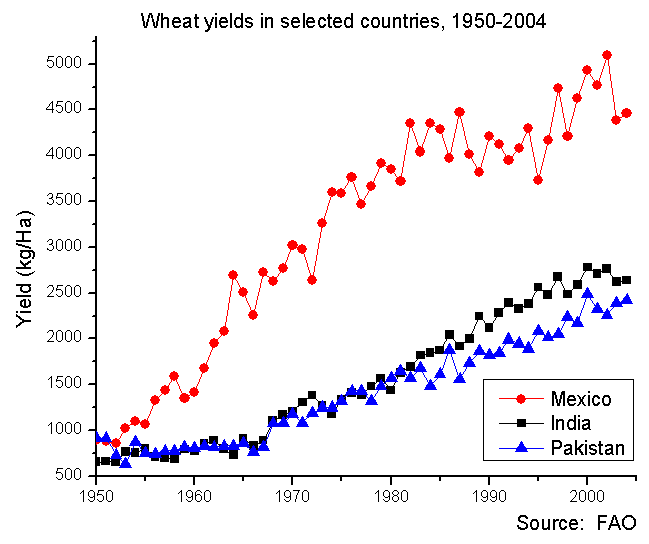
Wheat yields in Mexico, India and Pakistan, 1950 to 2004. Baseline is 500 kg/ha.

In 1961–1962, Borlaug's dwarf spring wheat strains were sent for multilocation testing in the International Wheat Rust Nursery, organized by the U.S. Department of Agriculture. In March 1962, a few of these strains were grown in the fields of the Indian Agricultural Research Institute in Pusa, New Delhi, India. In May 1962, M. S. Swaminathan, a member of IARI's wheat program, requested of Dr B. P. Pal, director of IARI, to arrange for the visit of Borlaug to India and to obtain a wide range of dwarf wheat seed possessing the Norin 10 dwarfing genes. The letter was forwarded to the Indian Ministry of Agriculture headed by Shri C. Subramaniam, which arranged with the Rockefeller Foundation for Borlaug's visit.

In March 1963, the Rockefeller Foundation and the Mexican government sent Borlaug and Dr Robert Glenn Anderson to India to continue his work. He supplied 100 kg (220 lb) of seed from each of the four most promising strains and 630 promising selections in advanced generations to the IARI in October 1963, and test plots were subsequently planted at Delhi, Ludhiana, Pant Nagar, Kanpur, Pune and Indore. Anderson stayed as head of the Rockefeller Foundation Wheat Program in New Delhi until 1975.

During the mid-1960s, the Indian subcontinent was at war and experienced minor famine and starvation, which was limited partially by the U.S. shipping a fifth of its wheat production to India in 1966 and 1967. The Indian and Pakistani bureaucracies and the region's cultural opposition to new agricultural techniques initially prevented Borlaug from fulfilling his desire to plant the new wheat strains there immediately. In 1965, in response to food shortages, Borlaug imported 550 tons of seeds for the government.

Biologist Paul R. Ehrlich wrote in his 1968 bestseller The Population Bomb, "The battle to feed all of humanity is over [...] In the 1970s and 1980s, hundreds of millions of people will starve to death in spite of any crash programs embarked upon now." Ehrlich said, "I have yet to meet anyone familiar with the situation who thinks India will be self-sufficient in food by 1971," and "India couldn't possibly feed two hundred million more people by 1980."

In 1965, after extensive testing, Borlaug's team, under Anderson, began its effort by importing about 450 tons of Lerma Rojo and Sonora 64 semi-dwarf seed varieties: 250 tons went to Pakistan and 200 to India. They encountered many obstacles. Their first shipment of wheat was held up in Mexican customs and so it could not be shipped from the port at Guaymas in time for proper planting. Instead, it was sent via a 30-truck convoy from Mexico to the U.S. port in Los Angeles, encountering delays at the Mexico–United States border. Once the convoy entered the U.S., it had to take a detour, as the U.S. National Guard had closed the freeway due to the Watts riots in Los Angeles. When the seeds reached Los Angeles, a Mexican bank refused to honor Pakistan's treasury payment of US$100,000, because the check contained three misspelled words. Still, the seed was loaded onto a freighter destined for Bombay, India, and Karachi, Pakistan. Twelve hours into the freighter's voyage, war broke out between India and Pakistan over the Kashmir region. Borlaug received a telegram from the Pakistani minister of agriculture, Malik Khuda Bakhsh Bucha: "I'm sorry to hear you are having trouble with my check, but I've got troubles, too. Bombs are falling on my front lawn. Be patient, the money is in the bank..."

These delays prevented Borlaug's group from conducting the germination tests needed to determine seed quality and proper seeding levels. They started planting immediately and often worked in sight of artillery flashes. A week later, Borlaug discovered that his seeds were germinating at less than half the normal rate. It later turned out that the seeds had been damaged in a Mexican warehouse by over-fumigation with a pesticide. He immediately ordered all locations to double their seeding rates.

The initial yields of Borlaug's crops were higher than any ever harvested in South Asia. The countries subsequently committed to importing large quantities of both the Lerma Rojo 64 and Sonora 64 varieties. In 1966, India imported 18,000 tons—the largest purchase and import of any seed globally at that time. In 1967, Pakistan imported 42,000 tons, and Turkey 21,000 tons. Pakistan's import, planted on 1.5 million acres (6,100 km^{2}), produced enough wheat to seed the entire nation's wheatland the following year. By 1968, when Ehrlich's book was released, William Gaud of the United States Agency for International Development was calling Borlaug's work a "Green Revolution". High yields led to a shortage of various utilities—labor to harvest the crops, bullock carts to haul it to the threshing floor, jute bags, trucks, rail cars, and grain storage facilities. Some local governments were forced to close school buildings temporarily to use them for grain storage.

Wheat yields in least developed countries since 1961

In Pakistan, wheat yields nearly doubled, from 4.6 million tons in 1965 to 7.3 million tons in 1970; Pakistan was self-sufficient in wheat production by 1968. Yields were over 21 million tons by 2000. In India, yields increased from 12.3 million tons in 1965 to 20.1 million tons in 1970. By 1974, India was self-sufficient in the production of all cereals. By 2000, India was harvesting a record 76.4 million tons (2.81 billion bushels) of wheat. Since the 1960s, food production in both nations has increased faster than the rate of population growth. India's use of high-yield farming has prevented an estimated 100 million acres (400,000 km^{2}) of virgin land from being converted into farmland—an area about the size of California, or 13.6% of the total area of India. The use of these wheat varieties has also had a substantial effect on production in six Latin American countries, six countries in the Near and Middle East, and several others in Africa.

Borlaug's work with wheat contributed to the development of high-yield semi-dwarf indica and japonica rice cultivars at the International Rice Research Institute and China's Hunan Rice Research Institute. Borlaug's colleagues at the Consultative Group on International Agricultural Research also developed and introduced a high-yield variety of rice throughout most of Asia. Land devoted to the semi-dwarf wheat and rice varieties in Asia expanded from 200 acres (0.8 km^{2}) in 1965 to over 40 million acres (160,000 km^{2}) in 1970. In 1970, this land accounted for over 10% of the more productive cereal land in Asia.

=== Nobel Peace Prize ===
For his contributions to the world food supply, Borlaug was awarded the Nobel Peace Prize in 1970. Norwegian officials notified his wife in Mexico City at 4:00 a.m., but Borlaug had already left for the test fields in the Toluca valley, about 40 miles (65 km) west of Mexico City. A chauffeur took her to the fields to inform her husband. According to his daughter, Jeanie Laube, "My mom said, 'You won the Nobel Peace Prize,' and he said, 'No, I haven't', [...] It took some convincing [...] He thought the whole thing was a hoax". He was awarded the prize on December 10.

In his Nobel Lecture the following day, he speculated on his award: "When the Nobel Peace Prize Committee designated me the recipient of the 1970 award for my contribution to the 'green revolution', they were in effect, I believe, selecting an individual to symbolize the vital role of agriculture and food production in a world that is hungry, both for bread and for peace". His speech repeatedly presented improvements in food production within a sober understanding of the context of population. "The green revolution has won a temporary success in man's war against hunger and deprivation; it has given man a breathing space. If fully implemented, the revolution can provide sufficient food for sustenance during the next three decades. But the frightening power of human reproduction must also be curbed; otherwise, the success of the green revolution will be ephemeral.

"Most people still fail to comprehend the magnitude and menace of the "Population Monster"[...] Since man is potentially a rational being, however, I am confident that within the next two decades he will recognize the self-destructive course he steers along the road of irresponsible population growth [...]"

=== Borlaug hypothesis ===
Borlaug continually advocated increasing crop yields as a means to curb deforestation. The substantial role he played in both increasing crop yields and promoting this view has led agricultural economists to call this methodology the "Borlaug hypothesis," namely that increasing the productivity of agriculture on the best farmland can help control deforestation by reducing the demand for new farmland. According to this view, assuming that global food demand is on the rise, restricting crop usage to traditional low-yield methods would also require at least one of the following: the world population to decrease, either voluntarily or as a result of mass starvations; or the conversion of forest land into cropland. It is thus argued that high-yield techniques are ultimately saving ecosystems from destruction. On a global scale, this view holds strictly true ceteris paribus, if deforestation only occurs to increase land for agriculture. But other land uses exist, such as urban areas, pasture, or fallow, so further research is necessary to ascertain what land has been converted for what purposes, to determine how true this view remains.

Increased profits from high-yield production may also induce cropland expansion in any case. As world food needs decrease, this expansion may decrease as well.

Borlaug expressed the idea now known as the "Borlaug hypothesis" in a speech given in Oslo, Norway, in 2000, upon the occasion of the 30th anniversary of his acceptance of the Nobel Peace Prize: "Had the global cereal yields of 1950 still prevailed in 1999, we would have needed nearly 1.8 billion ha of additional land of the same quality – instead of the 600 million that was used – to equal the current global harvest."

=== Criticisms and his view of critics ===
Borlaug's name is nearly synonymous with the Green Revolution, against which many criticisms have been mounted over the decades. The journalist John Vidal, writing in The Guardian, commented that the plaudits and honors heaped on Borlaug present him as a "saint or even the god of American farmers", but that the technology was far from perfect. The Green Revolution promised to end hunger and poverty, and to benefit rural societies everywhere. Instead, its long-term effects included what the Indian environmentalist Vandana Shiva has called "rural impoverishment, increased debt, social inequality and the displacement of vast numbers of peasant farmers". Vidal further cites the political commentator Alexander Cockburn, who wrote that Borlaug was "aside from Kissinger, probably the biggest killer of all to have got the peace prize", given that his wheat "led to the death of peasants by the million".

His farming techniques often reaped large profits for U.S. agribusiness and agrochemical corporations to the detriment of subsistence farmers and were criticized as widening social inequality in affected countries owing to uneven food distribution while forcing the capitalist agenda of U.S. corporations. In particular, Cockburn argues that "`Advances' in agricultural technology are mostly ways to tie the farmer into a cycle of debt peonage, to restrict production in favour of the big growers and to send the little guy to the wall." He further cites the CIA-backed coups in Guatemala and Iran to illustrate concrete efforts to block governments favorable to land reform

Environmentalists particularly raised the alarm over the crossing of genetic barriers; the inability of a single crop to fulfill all nutritional requirements; the decreased biodiversity from planting few varieties; the environmental and economic effects of inorganic fertilizer and pesticides; the side effects of large amounts of herbicides sprayed on fields of herbicide-resistant crops; and the destruction of wilderness caused by the construction of roads in populated third-world areas.

Throughout his years of research, Borlaug complained about opposition from Western environmentalists who he argued favored abstract ideology over practical, scientific solutions like chemical inputs Borlaug refuted or dismissed most critiques of his critics but did take certain concerns seriously. He stated that his work has been "a change in the right direction, but it has not transformed the world into a Utopia". Of environmentalists opposing his work, he stated, "some of the environmental lobbyists of the Western nations are the salt of the earth, but many of them are elitists. They've never experienced the physical sensation of hunger. They do their lobbying from comfortable office suites in Washington or Brussels. If they lived just one month amid the misery of the developing world, as I have for fifty years, they'd be crying out for tractors and fertilizer and irrigation canals and be outraged that fashionable elitists back home were trying to deny them these things." Borlaug cautioned, "There are no miracles in agricultural production. Nor is there such a thing as a miracle variety of wheat, rice, or maize which can serve as an elixir to cure all ills of a stagnant, traditional agriculture."

== Later roles ==
Following his retirement, Borlaug continued to participate in teaching, research, and activism. He spent much of the year based at CIMMYT in Mexico, conducting research, and four months of the year serving at Texas A&M University, where he had been a distinguished professor of international agriculture since 1984. From 1994 to 2003, Borlaug served on the International Fertilizer Development Center board of directors. In 1999, the university's Board of Regents named its US$16 million Center for Southern Crop Improvement in honor of Borlaug. He worked in the building's Heep Center, and taught one semester each year.

=== Production in Africa ===
In the early 1980s, environmental groups opposed to Borlaug's methods campaigned against his planned expansion of efforts into Africa. They prompted the Rockefeller and Ford Foundations and the World Bank to stop funding most of his African agricultural projects. Western European governments were persuaded to stop supplying fertilizer to Africa. According to David Seckler, former Director General of the International Water Management Institute, "the environmental community in the 1980s went crazy pressuring the donor countries and the big foundations not to support ideas like inorganic fertilizers for Africa."

In 1984, during the Ethiopian famine, Ryoichi Sasakawa, the chairman of the Japan Shipbuilding Industry Foundation (now the Nippon Foundation), contacted the semi-retired Borlaug, wondering why the methods used in Asia were not extended to Africa, and hoping Borlaug could help. He convinced Borlaug to help with this new effort, and Borlaug assisted in creating the Sasakawa Africa Association (SAA) to coordinate the project.

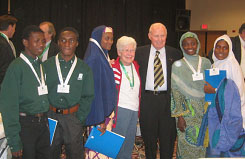
Nigerian exchange students meet Norman Borlaug (third from right) at the World Food seminar, 2003.

The SAA is a research and extension organization that aims to increase food production in African countries struggling with food shortages. "I assumed we'd do a few years of research first," Borlaug later recalled, "but after I saw the terrible circumstances there, I said, 'Let's just start growing'." Soon, Borlaug and the SAA had projects in seven countries. Yields of maize in developed African countries tripled. Yields of wheat, sorghum, cassava, and cowpeas also increased in these countries. At present (more than ten years after Borlaug died in 2009), program activities are under way in Benin, Burkina Faso, Ethiopia, Ghana, Guinea, Mali, Malawi, Mozambique, Nigeria, Tanzania, and Uganda, all of which suffered from repeated famines in previous decades.

From 1986 to 2009, Borlaug was the President of the SAA. That year, a joint venture between The Carter Center and SAA was launched called Sasakawa-Global 2000 (SG 2000). The program focuses on food, population, and agricultural policy. Since then, more than 8 million small-scale farmers in 15 African countries have been trained in SAA farming techniques, which have helped them to double or triple grain production. Those elements that allowed Borlaug's projects to succeed in India and Pakistan, such as well-organized market economies, transportation, and irrigation systems, are severely lacking throughout much of Africa, posing additional obstacles to increasing yields and reducing the ongoing threat of food shortages. Because of these challenges, Borlaug's initial projects were restricted to relatively developed regions of the continent.

Despite these setbacks, Borlaug found encouragement. While visiting Ethiopia in 1994, after a major famine, Jimmy Carter won the support of Prime Minister Meles Zenawi for a campaign to aid farmers by using the fertilizer diammonium phosphate and Borlaug's methods. The following season, Ethiopia recorded the largest harvests of major crops in history, with a 32% increase in production and a 15% increase in average yield over the previous season. For Borlaug, the rapid increase in yields suggested that there was still hope for higher food production throughout sub-Saharan Africa, despite lingering questions about population sustainability and the absence of long-term studies in Africa.

=== World Food Prize ===
The World Food Prize is an international award recognizing individuals who have advanced human development by improving the quality, quantity, or availability of food worldwide. The prize was created in 1986 by Norman Borlaug as a way to recognize personal accomplishments and to educate, with the Prize helping to establish role models for others. The first prize was given to Borlaug's former colleague, M. S. Swaminathan, in 1987, for his work in India. The next year, Swaminathan used the US$250,000 prize to establish the MS Swaminathan Research Foundation for research on sustainable development.

=== Global stem rust and the Borlaug Global Rust Initiative ===
In 2005, Borlaug, with his former graduate student Ronnie Coffman, convened an international expert panel in Kenya on the emerging threat of Ug99 in East Africa. The working group produced a report, "Sounding the Alarm on Global Stem Rust", and their work led to the formation of the Global Rust Initiative. In 2008, with funding from the Bill & Melinda Gates Foundation, the organization was re-named the Borlaug Global Rust Initiative.

=== Future of global farming and food supply ===
The limited potential for land expansion for cultivation worried Borlaug, who, in March 2005, stated that, "we will have to double the world food supply by 2050." With 85% of future growth in food production originating from lands already in use, he recommends a multidisciplinary research focus to further increase yields, mainly through increased crop immunity to large-scale diseases, such as the rust fungus, which affects all cereals except rice. His dream was to "transfer rice immunity to cereals such as wheat, maize, sorghum and barley, and transfer bread-wheat proteins (gliadin and glutenin) to other cereals, especially rice and maize".

Borlaug believed that genetically modified organisms were the only way to increase food production as the world runs out of unused arable land. Genetic modification was not inherently dangerous "because we've been genetically modifying plants and animals for a long time. Long before we called it science, people were selecting the best breeds." In a review of Borlaug's 2000 publication entitled Ending world hunger: the promise of biotechnology and the threat of antiscience zealotry, the authors argued that Borlaug's warnings were still true in 2010:

GM crops are as natural and safe as today's bread wheat, opined Dr. Borlaug, who also reminded agricultural scientists of their moral obligation to stand up to the antiscience crowd and warn policy makers that global food insecurity will not disappear without this new technology, and ignoring this reality, global food insecurity would make future solutions all the more difficult to achieve.

— Rozwadowski and Kagale

According to Borlaug, "Africa, the former Soviet republics, and the cerrado are the last frontiers. After they are in use, the world will have no additional sizable blocks of arable land left to put into production, unless you are willing to level whole forests, which you should not do. So, future food production increases will have to come from higher yields. And though I have no doubt yields will keep going up, whether they can go up enough to feed the population monster is another matter. Unless progress with agricultural yields remains very strong, the next century will experience sheer human misery that, on a numerical scale, will exceed the worst of everything that has come before".

Besides increasing the worldwide food supply, early in his career, Borlaug stated that steps to slow the rate of population growth will also be necessary to prevent food shortages. In his Nobel Lecture of 1970, Borlaug stated, "Most people still fail to comprehend the magnitude and menace of the 'Population Monster' [...] If it continues to increase at the estimated present rate of two percent a year, the world population will reach 6.5 billion by the year 2000. Currently, with each second, or tick of the clock, about 2.2 additional people are added to the world population. The rhythm of increase will accelerate to 2.7, 3.3, and 4.0 for each tick of the clock by 1980, 1990, and 2000, respectively, unless man becomes more realistic and preoccupied about this impending doom. The tick-tock of the clock will continually grow louder and more menacing each decade. Where will it all end?" However, some observers have suggested that by the 1990s, Borlaug had changed his position on population control. They point to a quote from the year 2000 in which he stated: "I now say that the world has the technology—either available or well advanced in the research pipeline—to feed on a sustainable basis a population of 10 billion people. The more pertinent question today is whether farmers and ranchers will be permitted to use this new technology? While the affluent nations can certainly afford to adopt ultra low-risk positions, and pay more for food produced by the so-called 'organic' methods, the one billion chronically undernourished people of the low-income, food-deficit nations cannot." However, Borlaug remained on the advisory board of Population Media Center, an organization working to stabilize world population, until his death.

== Death ==
Borlaug died of lymphoma at the age of 95, on September 12, 2009, in his Dallas home.

Borlaug's children released a statement saying, "We would like his life to be a model for making a difference in the lives of others and to bring about efforts to end human misery for all mankind."

The Prime Minister of India Manmohan Singh and President of India Pratibha Patil paid tribute to Borlaug saying, "Borlaug's life and achievement are testimony to the far-reaching contribution that one man's towering intellect, persistence and scientific vision can make to human peace and progress."

The United Nations' Food and Agriculture Organization described Borlaug as "a towering scientist whose work rivals that of the 20th century's other great scientific benefactors of humankind" and Kofi Annan, former Secretary-General of the United Nations said, "As we celebrate Dr. Borlaug's long and remarkable life, we also celebrate the long and productive lives that his achievements have made possible for so many millions of people around the world[...] we will continue to be inspired by his enduring devotion to the poor, needy and vulnerable of our world."

== Honors and awards ==
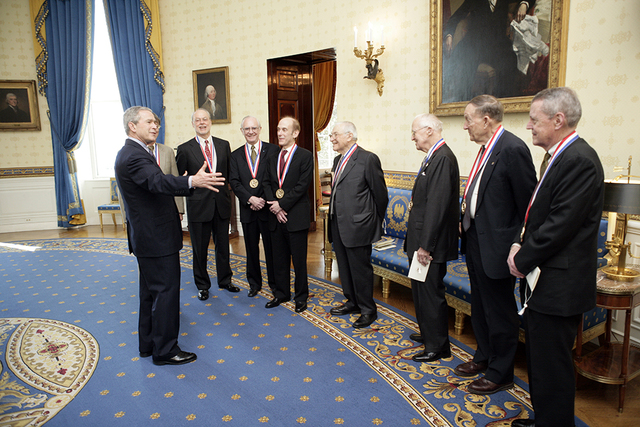
President George W. Bush speaks with National Medal of Science Laureates, White House, 2006. Dr. Norman E. Borlaug is second from left.

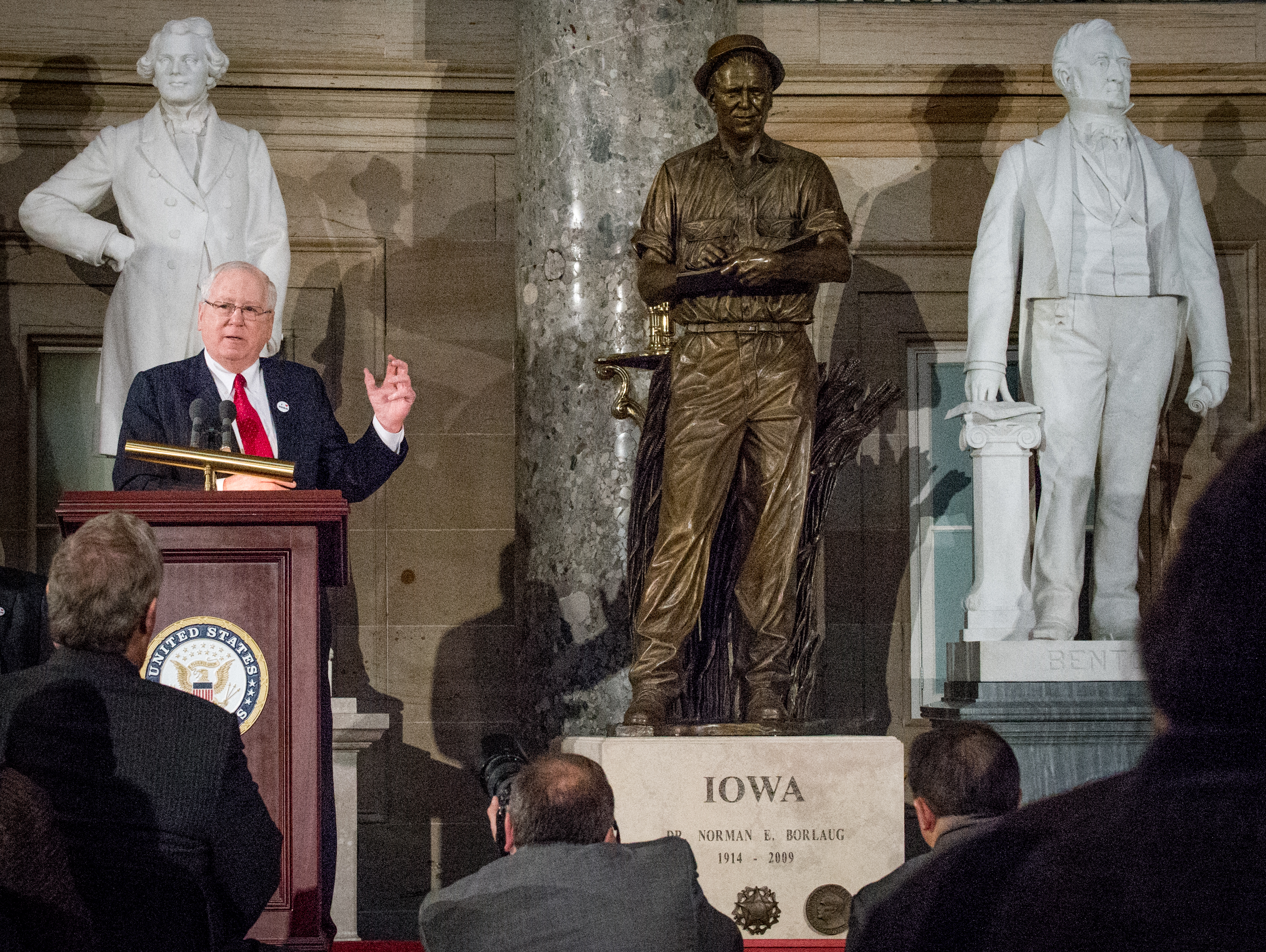
Dedication of the Norman Borlaug statue in the National Statuary Hall at the U. S. Capitol, 2014

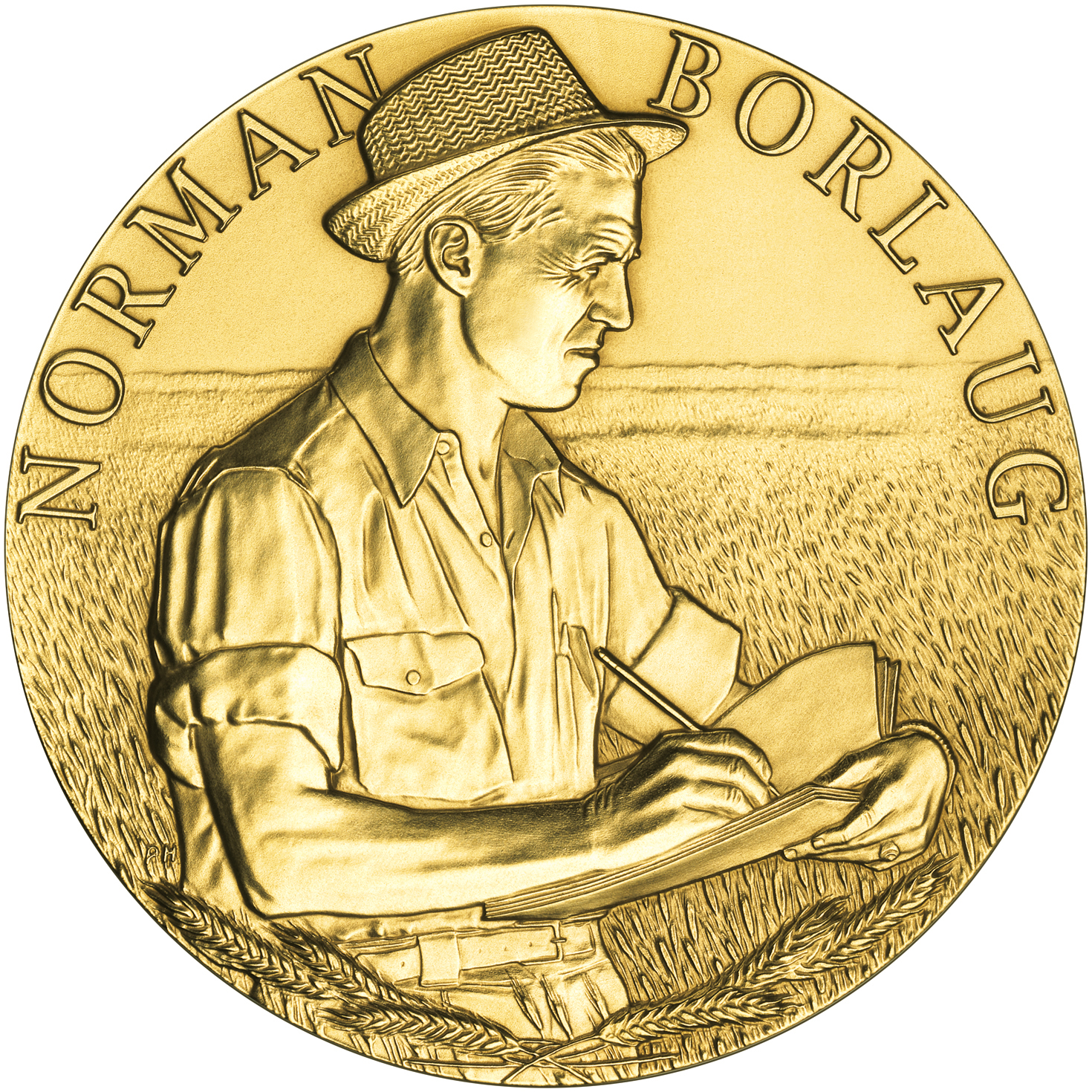
Norman Borlaug Congressional Gold Medal, 2006

In 1968, Borlaug received what he considered an especially satisfying tribute when the people of Ciudad Obregón, where some of his earliest experiments were undertaken, named a street after him. Also in that year, he became a member of the U.S. National Academy of Sciences.

In 1970, he was given an honorary doctorate by the Agricultural University of Norway.

In 1970, he was awarded the Nobel Peace Prize by the Norwegian Nobel Committee "for his contributions to the 'green revolution' that was having such an impact on food production, particularly in Asia and in Latin America."

In 1970, he was awarded the Order of the Aztec Eagle by the Mexican government.

In 1971, he was named a Distinguished Fellow of the National Academy of Agronomy and Veterinary Medicine of Argentina

In 1971, he received the American Academy of Achievement's Golden Plate Award.

In 1974, he was awarded a Peace Medal (in the form of a dove, carrying a wheat ear in its beak) by Haryana Agricultural University, Hisar, India.

In 1975, he was named a Distinguished Fellow of the Iowa Academy of Science.

In 1980, he received the S. Roger Horchow Award for Greatest Public Service by a Private Citizen, an award given out annually by Jefferson Awards.

In 1980, he was elected an honorary member of the Hungarian Academy of Sciences.

In 1984, his name was placed in the National Agricultural Hall of Fame at the national center in Bonner Springs, Kansas. Also that year, he was recognized for sustained service to humanity through outstanding contributions in plant breeding from the Governors Conference on Agriculture Innovations in Little Rock, Arkansas. Also in 1984, he received the Henry G. Bennet Distinguished Service Award at commencement ceremonies at Oklahoma State University.

In 1986, Borlaug was inducted into the Scandinavian-American Hall of Fame during Norsk Høstfest.

Borlaug was elected a Foreign Member of the Royal Society (ForMemRS) in 1987.

Borlaug had a long history of involvement with the Council for Agricultural Science and Technology (CAST). Borlaug's remarks as the invited speaker at the organization's 1973 conference became its first published paper. Borlaug received the organization's Charles A. Black Award in 2005 for his contributions to public policy and the public understanding of science. In 2010, CAST changed the name of the Charles A. Black Award (1986–2009) to the Borlaug CAST Communication Award.

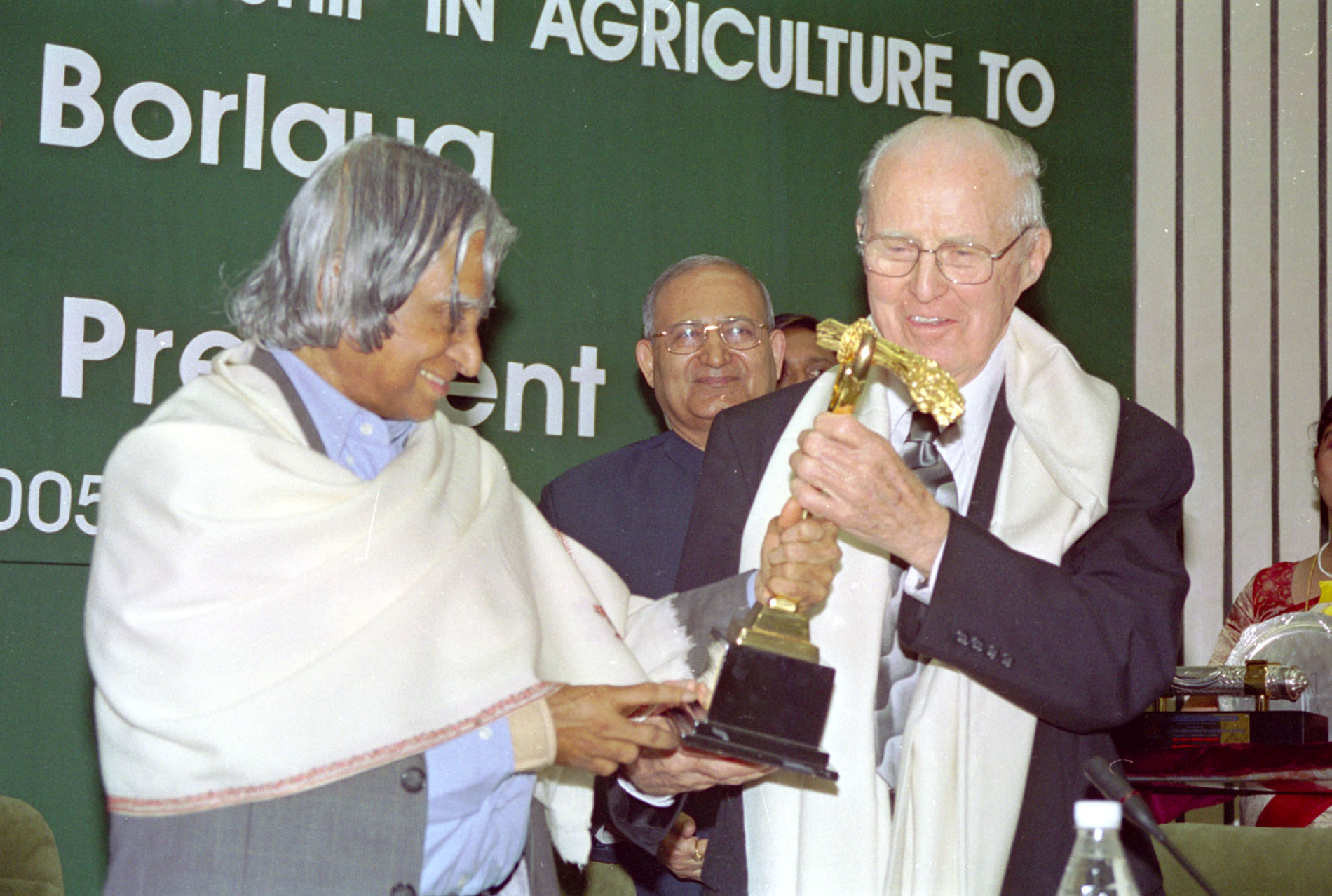
Borlaug being awarded the first M. S. Swaminathan Award for Leadership in Agriculture by Indian President A. P. J. Abdul Kalam in New Delhi, India, 2005

On August 19, 2013, his statue was unveiled inside the ICAR's NASC Complex at New Delhi, India.

On March 25, 2014, a statue of Borlaug at the United States Capitol was unveiled in a ceremony on the 100th anniversary of his birth. This statue replaces the statue of James Harlan as one of the two statues given to the National Statuary Hall Collection by the state of Iowa.

Borlaug received the 1977 U.S. Presidential Medal of Freedom, the 2002 Public Welfare Medal from the National Academy of Sciences, the 2002 Rotary International Award for World Understanding and Peace, and the 2004 National Medal of Science. As of January 2004, Borlaug had received 49 honorary degrees from as many universities, in 18 countries, the most recent from Dartmouth College on June 12, 2005, and was a foreign or honorary member of 22 international Academies of Sciences. In Iowa and Minnesota, "World Food Day", October 16, is referred to as "Norman Borlaug World Food Prize Day". Throughout the United States, it is referred to as "World Food Prize Day".

In 2006, the Government of India conferred on him its second-highest civilian award: the Padma Vibhushan. He was awarded the Danforth Award for Plant Science by the Donald Danforth Plant Science Center, St Louis, Missouri in recognition of his lifelong commitment to increasing global agricultural production through plant science.

The stained-glass World Peace Window at St. Mark's Episcopal Cathedral in Minneapolis, Minnesota, depicts "peace makers" of the 20th century, including Norman Borlaug.

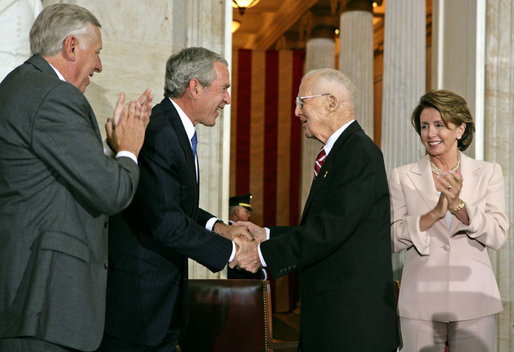
President George W. Bush along with House Majority Leader Steny Hoyer and House Speaker Nancy Pelosi congratulate Borlaug during the Congressional Gold Medal Ceremony on July 17, 2007.

In August 2006, Dr. Leon Hesser published The Man Who Fed the World: Nobel Peace Prize Laureate Norman Borlaug and His Battle to End World Hunger, an account of Borlaug's life and work. On August 4, the book received the 2006 Print of Peace award, as part of International Read For Peace Week. Borlaug is also the subject of the documentary film The Man Who Tried to Feed the World which first aired on American Experience on April 21, 2020.

On September 27, 2006, the United States Senate, by unanimous consent, passed the Congressional Tribute to Dr. Norman E. Borlaug Act of 2006. The act authorizes that Borlaug be awarded America's highest civilian award, the Congressional Gold Medal. On December 6, 2006, the House of Representatives passed the measure by voice vote. President George Bush signed the bill into law on December 14, 2006, and it became Public Law Number 109–395. According to the act, "the number of lives Dr. Borlaug has saved [is] more than a billion people" The act authorizes the Secretary of the Treasury to strike and sell duplicates of the medal in bronze. He was presented with the medal on July 17, 2007.

Borlaug was a foreign fellow of the Bangladesh Academy of Sciences.

The Borlaug Dialogue (Norman E. Borlaug International Symposium) is named in his honour.

== Books ==
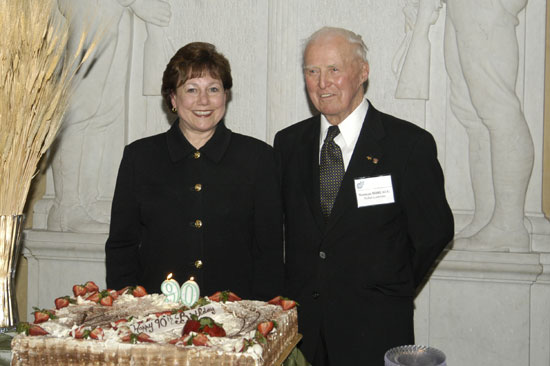
Borlaug with United States Secretary of Agriculture Ann M. Veneman near the birthday cake prepared for his 90th birthday

- The Green Revolution, Peace, and Humanity. 1970. Nobel Lecture, Norwegian Nobel Institute in Oslo, Norway. December 11, 1970.
- Wheat in the Third World. 1982. Authors: Haldore Hanson, Norman E. Borlaug, and R. Glenn Anderson. Boulder, Colorado: Westview Press. ISBN 0-86531-357-1
- Land use, food, energy and recreation. 1983. Aspen Institute for Humanistic Studies. ISBN 0-940222-07-8
- Feeding a human population that increasingly crowds a fragile planet. 1994. Mexico City. ISBN 968-6201-34-3
- Norman Borlaug on World Hunger. 1997. Edited by Anwar Dil. San Diego/Islamabad/Lahore: Bookservice International. 499 pages. ISBN 0-9640492-3-6
- The Green Revolution Revisited and the Road Ahead. 2000. Anniversary Nobel Lecture, Norwegian Nobel Institute in Oslo, Norway. September 8, 2000.
- "Ending World Hunger. The Promise of Biotechnology and the Threat of Antiscience Zealotry". 2000. Plant Physiology, October 2000, Vol. 124, pp. 487–90. (duplicate)
- Feeding a World of 10 Billion People: The TVA/IFDC Legacy. International Fertilizer Development Center, 2003. ISBN 0-88090-144-6
- Prospects for world agriculture in the twenty-first century. 2004. Norman E. Borlaug, Christopher R. Dowswell. Published in: Sustainable agriculture and the international rice-wheat system. ISBN 0-8247-5491-3
- Foreword to The Frankenfood Myth: How Protest and Politics Threaten the Biotech Revolution. 2004. Henry I. Miller, Gregory Conko. ISBN 0-275-97879-6
- Borlaug, Norman E. (June 27, 2007). "Sixty-two years of fighting hunger: personal recollections". Euphytica. 157 (3): 287–97. Bibcode:2007Euphy.157..287B. doi:10.1007/s10681-007-9480-9. S2CID 2927707.
