= Paul Christoph Mangelsdorf =

American botanist (1899–1989)

- Born: July 20, 1899; Atchison, Kansas, US
- Died: July 22, 1989 (aged 90); Chapel Hill, North Carolina, US
- Resting place: Mount Auburn Cemetery
- Education: Kansas State University; Harvard University
- Known for: Study of maize
- Scientific career
- Fields: Agronomy, botany
- Workplaces: Harvard University
- Doctoral advisor: Edward Murray East
- Author abbrev. (botany): Mangelsd.

Paul Christoph Mangelsdorf (July 20, 1899 – July 22, 1989) was an American botanist and agronomist, known for his work on the origins of maize. He served as professor of economic botany at Harvard University from 1940 to 1967.

== Life and education ==
Mangelsdorf was born in Atchison, Kansas. His father, a Prussian immigrant, ran a seeds and greenhouse concern; his mother was also German. He earned his bachelor's degree from Kansas State University in 1921, when it was still Kansas State Agricultural College. Later that year, he became Donald F. Jones's assistant at the Connecticut Agricultural Experiment Station and simultaneously furthered his studies at Harvard University, attaining his doctorate in 1925 under the direction of Edward Murray East.

In 1927 Mangelsdorf became a researcher at the Texas Agricultural Experiment Station, where he became interested in the genetic origins of maize. In 1940 he became a professor of economic botany at Harvard and continued his research there until his retirement in 1968. He simultaneously served as director of the Botanical Museum at Harvard University from 1945 to 1967 and chaired Harvard’s Institute for Research in Experimental and Applied Botany from 1947 to 1966. In this capacity, he oversaw the Arnold Arboretum, the Bussey Institution, the Harvard Forest, the Atkins Garden and Research Laboratory in Cuba, and the Maria Moors Cabot Foundation for Botanical Research. After his retirement, he continued his research at the University of North Carolina, Chapel Hill, where he died on July 22, 1989.

In 1941, Mangelsdorf became an agricultural consultant for the Rockefeller Foundation and was involved in the development of Office of Special Services that became the International Maize and Wheat Improvement Center. This project would be instrumental in the Green Revolution.

== Research ==
Mangelsdorf is noted for studying the origins and hybridization of maize. He co-wrote the book The Origin of Indian Corn and Its Relatives with Robert G. Reeves. They worked on a "Tripartite theory" of origin. According to the horticultural authority Noel Kingsbury, this theory enjoyed broad support on the strength of Mangelsdorf's "undisputed... reign as the international emperor of corn." However, advances in molecular genetics discredited the tripartite model in favor of the rival position of George Beadle, which identified corn as a domesticated offspring of teosinte. With D. F. Jones, Mangelsdorf developed and patented a method to improve hybrid corn production. The proceeds from this patent fund the Paul C. Mangelsdorf Professorship in Natural Science at Harvard.

== Honors and legacy ==
Mangelsdorf was elected to the American Academy of Arts and Sciences in 1940, the United States National Academy of Sciences in 1945, and the American Philosophical Society in 1955. He was in 1951 the president of the American Society of Naturalists, in 1955 the president of the Genetics Society of America, and in 1962 the president of the Society for Economic Botany.

== Family ==
Mangelsdorf married Helen Parker in 1923. They had two sons: Paul Christoph Jr., who worked as a physics professor at Swarthmore College for 29 years, and Clark Parker, who worked as an engineering professor at the University of Pittsburgh. A daughter of Paul Christoph Jr., Sarah C. Mangelsdorf, is a child psychologist and president of the University of Rochester since 2019.

== Bibliography ==
- Mangelsdorf, Paul Christoph (1974). Corn: its origin, evolution, and improvement. Belknap Press of Harvard University Press. ISBN 9780674171756.
