= De Villegas =

De Villegas is a surname. Notable people with the surname include:

- Andrés Rodríguez de Villegas (died 1633), Spanish colonial governor
- Diogo Ortiz de Villegas (1457–1519), Spanish Roman Catholic priest
- Esteban Manuel de Villegas (1589–1669), Spanish poet
- Hipólito de Villegas (c. 1761 – 1838), Chilean politician
- Pedro Ruiz de Villegas II (c. 1304–1355), Spanish noble
- Pedro de Villegas Marmolejo (1519–1596), Spanish Renaissance sculptor and painter
- Maria de Villegas de Saint-Pierre (1870-1941), Belgian Countess, writer, nurse and philanthropist

== See also ==
- Liga Georgina de Villegas, basketball league in Honduras
- 15785 de Villegas, main-belt minor planet
- Villegas (disambiguation)
