= Oliver E. Nelson Jr. =

American plant geneticist (1920–2001)

Oliver Evans Nelson Jr.
- Born: August 16, 1920; Seattle, Washington, U.S.
- Died: November 6, 2001 (aged 81); Madison, Wisconsin, U.S.
- Education: Colgate University (AB); Yale University (MS, PhD)
- Known for: Maize genetics; starch biosynthesis; transposon tagging in plants; quality protein maize
- Awards: John Scott Medal (1967); National Academy of Sciences (1972); Thomas Hunt Morgan Medal (1997)
- Scientific career
- Fields: Genetics, plant genetics
- Institutions: Purdue University; University of Wisconsin–Madison
- Doctoral advisor: Donald F. Jones

Oliver Evans Nelson Jr. (August 16, 1920 – November 6, 2001) was an American plant geneticist known for pioneering work in maize genetics, including the genetic and biochemical analysis of starch synthesis, the use of transposable elements in plants, and the development of nutritionally improved maize varieties such as quality protein maize (QPM). He was elected to the National Academy of Sciences in 1972.

== Early life and education ==
Nelson was born in Seattle, Washington, and raised in the New Haven, Connecticut area. He developed an early interest in genetics while working as a student assistant at the Connecticut Agricultural Experiment Station. He received his A.B. in botany from Colgate University in 1941 and went on to earn his M.S. and Ph.D. from Yale University under plant breeder Donald F. Jones in 1947.

== Career and research ==
Nelson joined the faculty of Purdue University in 1947, where he initially worked as a popcorn breeder and developed commercially useful lines. In 1969, he moved to the University of Wisconsin–Madison, where he spent the remainder of his career and later served as chair of the Laboratory of Genetics.

His research made key contributions to plant genetics and biochemistry. He carried out one of the first fine-structure genetic analyses of a gene in a higher plant using the waxy (wx1) locus, demonstrating intracistronic recombination and enabling analysis of gene structure in plants at a resolution comparable to that achieved in microbial systems. His work also showed that transposable elements could insert throughout genes, contributing to early understanding of gene structure and mutation in eukaryotes.

Nelson was among the first to connect visible mutant phenotypes in plants with underlying enzymatic defects. He demonstrated that the waxy locus encodes a starch-bound ADP-glucose glucosyltransferase, providing one of the earliest links between a plant gene and its biochemical function.

He further elucidated starch biosynthesis in maize through studies of additional endosperm mutants, including shrunken2, demonstrating that loss of ADP-glucose pyrophosphorylase activity leads to severe reductions in starch accumulation and establishing the central role of ADP-glucose in starch synthesis.

In collaboration with Nina Fedoroff and others, Nelson’s laboratory achieved the first cloning of a plant gene using transposon tagging at the maize bronze (bz) locus, a methodological breakthrough that transformed plant molecular genetics.

== Quality protein maize ==
One of Nelson’s most influential contributions was the discovery, with Edwin T. Mertz, Lynn S. Bates, and colleagues, that mutations such as opaque2 and floury2 increased levels of essential amino acids including lysine and tryptophan in maize. In a landmark 1964 study, Nelson, Mertz, and Bates demonstrated that the opaque2 mutant alters maize endosperm protein composition, increasing lysine content by up to ~70% relative to normal kernels. This work demonstrated that the nutritional quality of maize could be significantly improved through genetics and led to the eventual development of quality protein maize (QPM), which has been widely adopted in parts of Latin America, Africa, and Asia.

== Service and mentorship ==
Nelson played a major role in the maize genetics community, contributing to the organization of the Maize Genetics Conference and helping to establish standards for maize genetic nomenclature. He mentored numerous graduate students and postdoctoral researchers, many of whom became leaders in plant genetics.

== Honors and awards ==
Nelson received numerous honors for his contributions to genetics, including:

- Election to the National Academy of Sciences (1972)
- Thomas Hunt Morgan Medal (1997)
- Stephen Hales Prize from the American Society of Plant Biologists (1988)
- John Scott Medal (1967) together with Mertz for "First high quality protein corn"

== Personal life ==
Nelson married Gerda Hansen in 1963. He remained scientifically active until shortly before his death on November 6, 2001, despite significant health challenges.
