= Norfolk Cotton Manufactory =

The Norfolk Cotton Manufactory was a company that owned a mill on Mother Brook in Dedham, Massachusetts.

== Incorporation and ownership ==
The company was formed in 1807 and replaced a leather mill at Mother Brook's second privilege, located on present day Maverick Street. (Note: Original documents of the Norfolk Cotton Mill survive in the Dedham Museum and Archive.) The local men who invested the funds for the large, wooden, spinning mill, have been described as a "daring group of investors." There were 30 men, including Samuel Lowder, (Note: Lowder's brother-in-law was Benjamin Bussey.) Jonathan Avery, Rueben Guild, Calvin Guild, Pliny Bingham, William Howe, and others, who petitioned the Great and General Court to create the company. Stockholders included Nathaniel Ames, Calvin Guild Sr., (Note: Guild was a hat maker.) and Calvin Whiting. (Note: Whiting was a tinsmith from Connecticut Corner. Whiting also owned a company that delivered fresh water to homes via hollowed-out logs.) They were primarily professionals and tradesmen, with only two or three whose primary source of income was farming, and all but one lived in the First Parish.

Their petition was "framed in the language of patriotism," saying that by creating this local industry Americans could stop buying textiles from England and could keep the money at home. (Note: The petition said, "Your petitioners humbly conceive that the appropriation of a competent capital in the manufacture of an article, the produce of American soil, promises great utility to the public in lessening our dependence on foreign countries, in nerving the arm of industry in our own, and in keeping much of that money at home, which is now sent abroad.") With capital of $120,000, their petition for incorporation was granted, and like other manufacturing companies, they did not have to pay taxes as the Commonwealth wanted to support the industry.

In 1886, W.C. Avery and Edward D. Thayer leased the mill.

== Production and facilities ==
The year before it was incorporated, President Thomas Jefferson signed the Embargo Act of 1807, and then two years later the Non-Intercourse Act. This dramatically reduced the amount of trade with foreign countries, particularly France and England, and thus created a demand for American goods. It also allowed for investments that would have otherwise gone into international trade to be made on local industries.

In June 1808, Lowder, the company's clerk, placed an advertisement in The Norfolk Repository seeking bids to construct two buildings at the privilege. The first, the mill, was 60 feet by 30 feet and was designed to hold machines to spin cotton. The other, a house, was to be 33 feet by 25 feet. The plans, which builders could consult before submitting their bids, were kept in the office of Dr. Jesse Wheaton. The land had been purchased from one of the stockholders at a price of $3,900. The compound would grow to include a three-story spinning factory, four two-family homes, and other buildings for picking, dyeing, and bleaching, a machine shop, and one for weavers and foot-pedal looms. Almost all of the factory's product was sold in a two-story store on the property, but some were also sent out on consignment to selling agents.

== Production ==
Cotton was shipped north from plantations in the South and divided into smaller units. These were then sent to private homes, where they were picked clean of dirt and seeds, whipped until clean and fluffy, and then returned to the mill. This work was performed primarily by children, most of whom were from Dedham, though some came from as far away as Newton and Brighton. Others were descendants of Dedham’s original settlers. (Note: According to Neiswander, they included "members of the Morse, Gay, Whiting, Ellis, Richards, and Guild families, all of whom originally had extensive landholdings. With the subsequent division of the land over the centuries, apparently, some branches of the family needed income from their youngest members.")

As cotton manufacturing was still new to New England, "the inhabitants felt a degree of pride in having a cotton factory in their town, and whenever their friends from the interior visited them, the first thing thought of was to mention that there was a new cotton factory in the town, and that they must go and see its curious and wonderful machinery."

The company was prosperous and highly esteemed in the community, and its annual meetings were marked by festivities. From 1808 through the next decade, the company advertised for labor in local newspapers, as the work required more manpower than the part-time grist and saw mills that had previously operated along the brook. The company also lent machines to workers so they could process raw cotton fiber from home.

As the company flourished, it introduced new products such as satinet.

== Company fortunes ==
Given the embargo on trade, the economic conditions were very favorable for the new company. Prices for yarn and finished goods were high, and Ames recorded a 33% profit on his investment, recording in his diary that stock in the company was "200 dollars on a share, which they say have cost 600, but will not sell for 900, or 1000, dollars!” Shareholders put their profits back into the company, expecting high profits to continue.

The War of 1812 brought ruin to the company. The British cut off the supply of raw materials, and the economy crumbled. It also suffered from lack of qualified management. Officers of the company were elected annually, and none had prior experience in manufacturing.

In May 1814, a notice was published in The Dedham Gazette that all those who owed money to the mill needed to pay. It also said that there would be "a visit from the sheriff" if those who had raw cotton to pick and clean at home did not promptly return it to the mill. Selling agents around the country had $40,000 in unsold goods, and the company store had $20,000 in stock.

After the war, imports that were both cheaper and higher quality flooded the market. The company collapsed. In 1815, the company's land was valued at $11,000 but, in 1819, it fell to only $4,000.

The mill was purchased by Benjamin Bussey, "a man of excellent business capacity," in 1819 for a sum far below cost. For $12,500, Bussey obtained the land, water rights, buildings, and machinery as the only bidder at the auction. Shareholders received $250 for every $1,000 invested. Ames wrote that it was "a most loosing [sic] enterprise for poor Country Rats."

== Water level dispute ==
During this time period the owners of mills downstream also complained that the Norfolk Cotton Manufactory did not provide enough water downstream for them to use. The complaints continued, despite the creation of a committee in 1811 to look into the matter. Agreement was eventually made on the level of the water, and was marked by drill holes in rocks along the banks still visible today.

== Works cited ==
- Dedham Historical Society (2001). Images of America: Dedham. Arcadia Publishing. ISBN 978-0-7385-0944-0.
- Hanson, Robert Brand (1976). Dedham, Massachusetts, 1635-1890. Dedham Historical Society.
- Neiswander, Judith (2024). Mother Brook and the Mills of East Dedham. Damianos Publishing. ISBN 978-1-941573-66-2.
- Tritsch, Electa Kane (1986). Building Dedham. Dedham Historical Society.
- Worthington, Erastus (1900). Historical sketch of Mother Brook, Dedham, Mass: compiled from various records and papers, showing the diversion of a portion of the Charles River into the Neponset River and the manufactures on the stream, from 1639 to 1900. Dedham, MA: C.G. Wheeler.
