= QPM =

QPM may refer to:

- Quality protein maize, a high yield variety
- Quantitative phase contrast microscopy, a group of microscopy methods
- Quasi-phase-matching, a technique in nonlinear optics
- Queen's Police Medal, awarded to UK/Commonwealth police officers
- Questions of Procedure for Ministers, the confidential predecessor of the Ministerial Code (United Kingdom)
