= Stephen Kresovich =

American plant geneticist (born 1952)

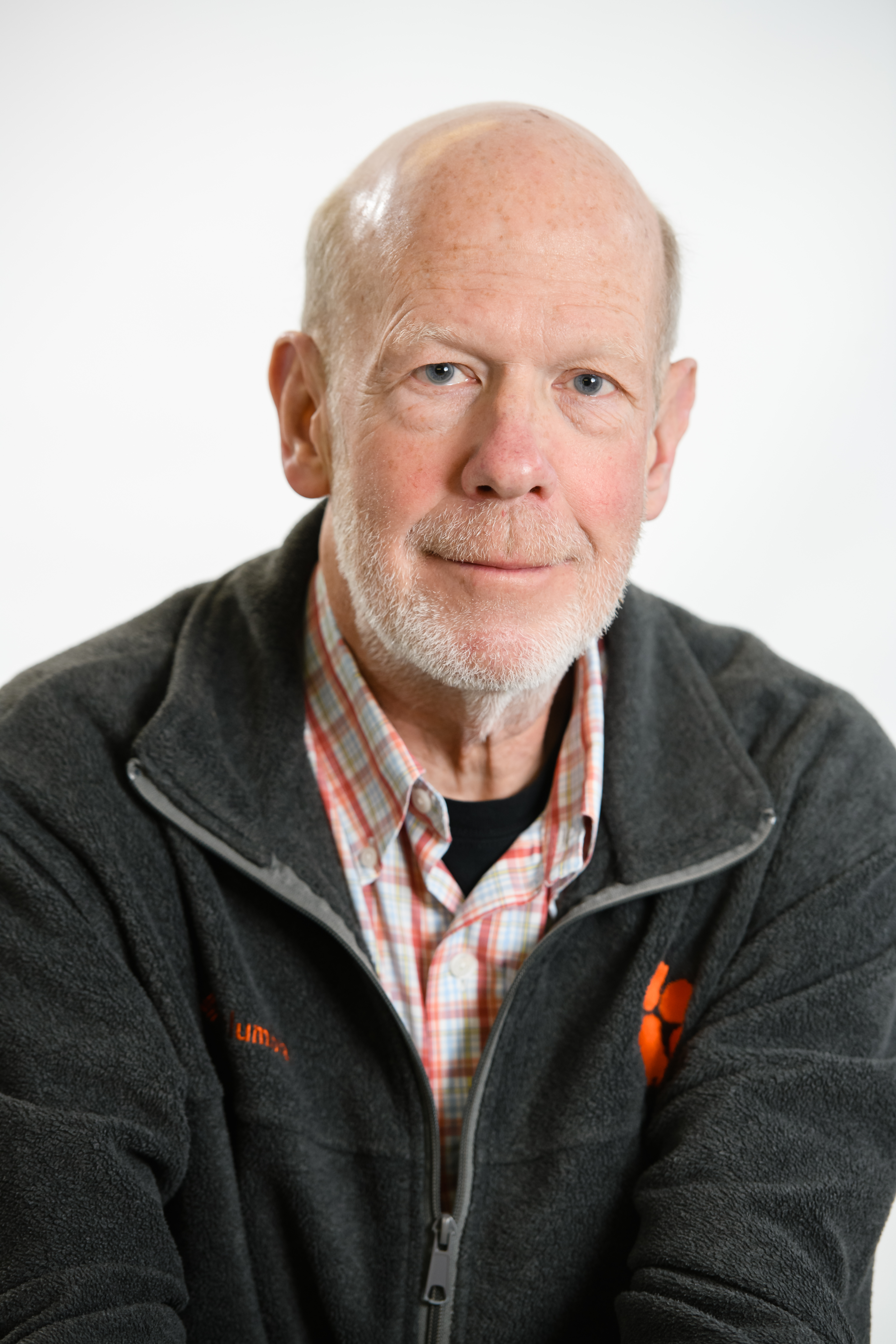
- Born: 1952 (age 73–74); McKeesport, Pennsylvania
- Education: Washington and Jefferson College, Texas A&M University, Ohio State University
- Known for: Conservation and use of crop genetic resources, comparative and population genomics of the Saccharinae, crop genome organization and evolution
- Awards: Fellow of the American Association for the Advancement of Science, Fellow of the Crop Science Society of America
- Scientific career
- Fields: Plant Genetics, Genetic Resources Conservation
- Workplaces: Battelle Memorial Institute; Texas A&M University; USDA, ARS; Cornell University; University of South Carolina; Clemson University
- Doctoral students: Seth C Murray
- Website: www.skgenomics.com

Stephen Kresovich (born 1952) is a plant geneticist and the Coker Endowed Chair of Genetics in the Department of Plant and Environmental Sciences at Clemson University and professor in the School of Integrative Plant Science in the College of Agriculture and Life Sciences at Cornell University. Since 2019 he has served as director of the Feed the Future Innovation Lab for Crop Improvement.

== Education ==
Kresovich received an A.B. in Biology in 1974 from Washington and Jefferson College, an M.S. in Agronomy from Texas A&M University in 1977, and his PhD from Ohio State in 1982.

== Career and Research ==
Kresovich has worked at Clemson University since 2013 as the Robert and Lois Coker Trustees Chair of Genetics and director of the Advanced Plant Technology Program, integrating advances in genetics and genomics to solve problems in agriculture, the environment, and human health. Kresovich held numerous administrative appointments at Cornell University from 1998-2009, including Vice Provost for Life Sciences from 2005-2009. He played a key role in the conception and launch of Weill Hall, a life sciences research center on Cornell's main campus. Kresovich re-established his connection with Cornell University in 2019 as director of the USAID Feed the Future Innovation Lab for Crop Improvement, and in 2020, was appointed a member of the National Genetic Resources Advisory Council by the U.S. Secretary of Agriculture.

From 2009-2011, Kresovich served as the Vice President for Research and Graduate Education at the University of South Carolina and South Carolina SmartState Endowed Chair until 2013. Prior to joining the Cornell faculty in 1998, Kresovich served as an agronomist at the Battelle Memorial Institute in 1977 and for eleven years as Laboratory Director at two U.S. National Genetic Resources Program genebanks in Geneva, New York (1987–93) and Griffin, Georgia (1993-98).

Kresovich’s research focuses on conservation genetics and improvement of crop plants including sorghum, maize, and sugar cane. His research objectives have included: (1) to identify genes of the sorghum, sugar cane, and maize genomes impacting evolution, domestication or crop improvement, (2) to characterize and understand the relationship between DNA sequence variation and desirable phenotypes, (3) to characterize molecular and phenotypic diversity of sorghum, sugar cane, and maize in natural populations, landraces, and elite germplasm, and (4) to develop and test strategies to efficiently discover, conserve, and use variation in natural populations and genebank collections by integrating current advances in genomics, bioinformatics, and plant genetics/breeding.

Kresovich has integrated genetic and genomic concepts and technologies into plant genetic resources management. In addition, his work has served as a model to enhance connections between effective conservation and use of genetic resources. Kresovich has over 175 peer-reviewed publications and has developed commercially released hybrids and germplasm of sugar cane and sweet sorghum. He has mentored over 40 graduate students and postdoctoral associates throughout his 40-year career, including Seth C Murray.

== Awards and honors ==
Kresovich is a Fellow of the American Association for the Advancement of Science (1995) and the Crop Science Society of America (1996). He has been awarded outstanding manuscript on “Plant Genetic Resources” in Crop Science in 2002, 2006, and 2011. Kresovich has also received certificates of Merit from the U.S. Department of Agriculture, Agricultural Research Service from 1989-1991 and 1995-1997, as well as a research award from the International Vetiver Research Network (World Bank and King of Thailand) in 1993.
