= Villegas =

Villegas may refer to:

== People ==
- Antonio Villegas (1928–1984), Filipino mayor
- Benito Villegas (1877–1952), Argentine chess player
- Bernardo Villegas, Filipino writer
- Betty Villegas, American politician
- Camilo Villegas (born 1982), Colombian golfer
- Carey Villegas, visual effects artist
- Conrado Villegas (1841–1884), Argentine general
- Constant Villegas (born 1986), French rugby league player
- Daniel Cosío Villegas (1898–1976), Mexican economist, essayist, historian and diplomat
- Dan Villegas, Filipino cinematographer and director
- David Villegas, better known as Dave Nada, Ecuadorian-American DJ and producer
- David Alex Villegas (born 1995), better known as Skinnyfromthe9, American rapper
- David Terrazas Villegas (1908–1955), Bolivian military officer
- Diego Osorio Villegas (1540–1601), Spanish governor of Venezuela
- Ernesto Villegas (born 1970), Venezuelan journalist and politician
- Eruviel Ávila Villegas (born 1969), Mexican politician
- Evangelina Villegas (1924–2017), Mexican biochemist
- Francisco Gil Villegas (born 1953), Mexican academic and publisher
- Guillermo Tell Villegas (1823–1907), Venezuelan politician and President of Venezuela
- Guillermo Tell Villegas Pulido (1854–1949), Venezuelan lawyer, journalist and politician
- Harry "Pombo" Villegas (1940–2019), Cuban Communist revolutionary
- Hilda Villegas Castrejón (1931–2012), Mexican surgeon and a pioneer in electron microscopy
- Ismael Villegas (born 1976), Puerto Rican baseball player
- Jaime Villegas (born 1950), Honduran footballer
- Jasmine Villegas (born 1993), American singer
- Jason Villegas (born 1977), American artist
- Javier Naranjo Villegas (1919–2014), Colombian Roman Catholic prelate
- José Villegas (1934–2021), Mexican footballer
- Juan Villegas, Argentine actor
- Lorenza Villegas Restrepo (1892–1960), Colombian First Lady
- Luis Villegas (born 1969), American guitarist
- Manuel Delgado Villegas (1943–1998), Spanish serial killer
- Manuel Villegas Piñateli (died 1752), member of the Royal Spanish Academy
- Micaela Villegas (1748–1819), Peruvian actress
- Petter Villegas (born 1975), Ecuador-born Puerto Rican footballer
- Raimundo Villegas (1931 - 2014), Venezuelan scientist
- Socrates B. Villegas (born 1960), Filipino Roman Catholic archbishop
- Thairo Estrada Villegas (born 1996), Venezuelan Major League Baseball player for the San Francisco Giants
- Vladimir Villegas (born 1961), Venezuelan journalist and politician
- Ysmael R. Villegas (1924–1945), American Medal of Honor recipient

== Other ==
- Villegas, Province of Burgos, municipality and village in Castile and León, Spain
- Río Villegas, village and municipality in Río Negro Province, Argentina
- CD Villegas, Spanish football club

== See also ==
- General Villegas, town in Buenos Aires Province, Argentina
- Alejandro Végh Villegas (1928–2017), Uruguayan economist
- Pablo Sainz Villegas (born 1977), Spanish classical guitarist
- de Villegas (disambiguation)
