= Edwin T. Mertz =

American biochemist (1909–1999)

Edwin Theodore Mertz
- Born: December 6, 1909; Missoula, Montana, U.S.
- Died: February 1, 1999 (aged 89); Indiana, U.S.
- Education: University of Montana; University of Illinois
- Known for: Discovery of high-lysine maize; characterization of the opaque2 mutant; contributions to quality protein maize
- Awards: National Academy of Sciences (1975); John Scott Medal (1967); Chemical Pioneer Award (1976)
- Scientific career
- Fields: Biochemistry, plant biochemistry
- Workplaces: Purdue University

Edwin Theodore Mertz (December 6, 1909 – February 1, 1999) was an American biochemist known for his contributions to plant biochemistry and nutrition. He is best known for the co-discovery of high-lysine maize through the characterization of mutants such as opaque2 and floury2, demonstrating that the nutritional quality of a major crop could be substantially improved through genetic variation.

== Life and career ==
Edwin Theodore Mertz was born on December 6, 1909, in Missoula, Montana. He received a B.A. in chemistry and mathematics from the University of Montana in 1931, followed by an M.S. (1933) and Ph.D. (1935) from the University of Illinois.

After early positions in industry and academia, including work at Armour and Company and the University of Illinois, he held appointments at the University of Iowa and the University of Missouri. In 1946, he joined Purdue University as an assistant professor of agricultural chemistry, where he spent the remainder of his career, becoming professor in 1957 and later professor emeritus.

Mertz died on February 1, 1999, from complications of pneumonia.

== Research contributions ==
Mertz’s research focused on the biochemical composition of plant storage proteins and their nutritional implications. His work on maize endosperm proteins helped establish how variation in protein composition affects essential amino acid content, particularly lysine.

Mertz is best known for his research on maize protein composition and nutrition. In collaboration with Oliver E. Nelson Jr. and Lynn S. Bates, Mertz co-discovered that mutations such as opaque2 and floury2 alter maize endosperm protein composition, increasing lysine content and improving nutritional quality. This work laid the foundation for the development of quality protein maize (QPM), which has been widely used to improve human and animal nutrition worldwide.

== Honors and awards ==
Mertz was elected to the National Academy of Sciences in 1975. He was a recipient of the following awards and distinctions:

- 1967 John Scott Medal (with Oliver E. Nelson Jr.) for the development of high-lysine corn
- 1968 Hoblitzelle National Award in the Agricultural Sciences
- 1968 Congressional Medal of the Federal Land Banks for the discovery of high-lysine corn
- 1970 Kenneth A. Spencer Award from the American Chemical Society
- 1972 Osborne–Mendel Award from the American Institute of Nutrition
- 1973 Distinguished Service Award from the University of Montana
- 1974 Edward W. Browning Award for contributions to improving the food supply
- 1975 Honorary Master Farmer Award from Prairie Farmer
- 1976 Chemical Pioneer Award from the American Institute of Chemists
- 1987 Richard Newbury McCoy Award from Purdue University

Purdue University has established the Edwin T. Mertz Memorial Scholarship in his name.
