= Evangelina Villegas =

Mexican biochemist

- Born: October 24, 1924; Mexico City
- Died: April 24, 2017 (aged 92); Mexico City
- Education: National Polytechnic Institute, Kansas State University and North Dakota State University.
- Known for: Quality Protein Maize
- Awards: 2000 World Food Prize
- Scientific career
- Fields: Cereal chemistry
- Workplaces: National Institute of Nutrition, International Maize and Wheat Improvement Center (CIMMYT).

Evangelina Villegas Moreno (Note: In this name that follows Hispanic American naming customs, the first or paternal surname is Villegas and the second or maternal family name is Moreno.) (October 24, 1924 – April 24, 2017) was a Mexican cereal biochemist whose work with maize led to the development of quality protein maize (QPM). She and her colleague from the International Maize and Wheat Improvement Center (CIMMYT), Surinder Vasal, shared the 2000 World Food Prize for this achievement. Villegas was the first woman to ever receive the World Food Prize.

== Education ==
Villegas did a B.A. chemistry and biology at the National Polytechnic Institute in Mexico City. Continuing her studies in the United States, she earned an M.Sc. on cereal technology from Kansas State University and a Ph.D. in cereal chemistry from North Dakota State University.

== Career ==
In 1950, Villegas became a chemist at the National Institute of Nutrition. She also worked as a librarian in the Office of Special Studies. Then in 1957, in this same office, she began work for the Wheat Industrial Quality Chemical Evaluation. A decade later, she would move to the International Maize and Wheat Improvement Center in Mexico (CIMMYT).

In the 1970s, Villegas began collaborative research with Vasal. Villegas was in charge of the lab investigating protein quality, while Vasal worked on developing QPM varieties that would gain widespread acceptance. Villegas and Vasal together combined existing "opaque-2" maize variety using molecular biology techniques. During this time, Villegas was credited for the evaluation, development, and adaptation of a chemical methodology to screen large numbers of small samples for industrial wheat quality and maize nutritional and protein quality.

She went on to be named Head of the General Service Laboratory in 1992, serve as a consultant for national programs for protein quality and industrial quality laboratories for Brazil, Argentina, and Guatemala. She would also be involved in the establishment of quality laboratories in India, Thailand, Egypt, Tunis, Ghana, the Philippines, Peru, Ecuador, Colombia, Bolivia, and Mexico.

== Legacy ==
While at the CIMMYT, Villegas created a scholarship for the "birders" (men hired to keep birds away from the grain). This allowed the men to go and pursue an education that they otherwise would not have been able to.

After her retirement, Villegas became an advisor to the Sasakawa Africa Association, to help improve agricultural technology in Africa. She also acted as an advisor to young scientists.

The chemical and analytical approaches she developed continue to aid the CIMMYT in their work to monitor protein quality in QPM. In 2017, following her death in April of that year, CIMMYT named a laboratory in Villegas's honor at its El Batán site near Texcoco, State of Mexico.

== Awards and honors ==
- 1972: Distinguished alumni award: National Polytechnic Institute
- 2000: Woman of the year: Mexican Women's Association
- 2000: World Food Prize (shared with Surinder Vasal)
- 2001: Lázaro Cárdenas Medal: National Polytechnic Institute
- 2001: Alpha Delta Kappa: International Women of Distinction
- 2002: Doctor of Science (honoris causa): Chapingo Autonomous University
- 2013: Distinguished alumni award: Kansas State University

== Selected publications ==
- Evangelina Villegas, Edwin Theodore Mertz. 1971. Chemical screening methods for maize protein quality at CIMMYT. Número 20 de Research bulletin – International Maize and Wheat Improvement Center. Editor CIMMYT, 14 pp.

=== Books ===
- S. Twumasi-Afriyie, w. Haag, Evangelina Villegas. 1999. Quality protein maize in Ghana: A partnership in research, development, and transfer of technology. En: Breth, SA (ed.)
- Enrique I. Ortega M., Reinald Bauer, Evangelina Villegas M. 1985. Métodos químicos usados en el CIMMYT para determinar la calidad de proteína de los cereales. 2ª edición de CIMMYT, 32 pp.
- Evangelina Villegas, Enrique Ortega Martínez, Reinald Bauer. 1984. Chemical methods used at CIMMYT for determining protein quality in cereal grains. Editor Protein Quality Laboratory, International Maize and Wheat Improvement Center, 35 pp.
- ——. 1968. Variability in lysine content of wheat, rye and triticale proteins. Editor International Maize and Wheat Improvement Center, 32 pp.
- ——. 1967. Variability in lysine content of wheat, rye and triticale proteins. Editor Dakota State University. 158 pp.
- ——. 1963. The role of sulfhydryl groups in flour. Editor Kansas State University, 124 pp.
