= Surinder Vasal =

Indian geneticist and plant breeder (born 1938)

Surinder Vasal is an Indian geneticist and plant breeder, known for his contributions in developing a maize variety with higher content of usable protein. He was born on 12 April 1938 in Amritsar in the Indian state of Punjab and received a PhD in genetics and plant breeding.

He worked with biochemist Evangelina Villegas for 35 years to develop a protein enriched form of maize in the 1970s. Quality Protein Maize is created by adding protein to low nutrient corn and is prevalent in China, Mexico, parts of Central America, and Africa today and is referenced as "miracle maize" because of its role in alleviating malnourishment. In addition to improving the nutritional value of maize, its productivity was also increased. They were jointly awarded the World Food Prize in 2000 for their development of Quality Protein Maize at the International Maize and Wheat Improvement Center in Mexico.

Vasal is an elected fellow of the National Academy of Agricultural Sciences.

In January 2025, he was honored with the Padma Shri, India's fourth-highest civilian award, by the Government of India.
