= Seth C. Murray =

American plant breeder (born 1980)

Prof. Seth C. Murray PhD
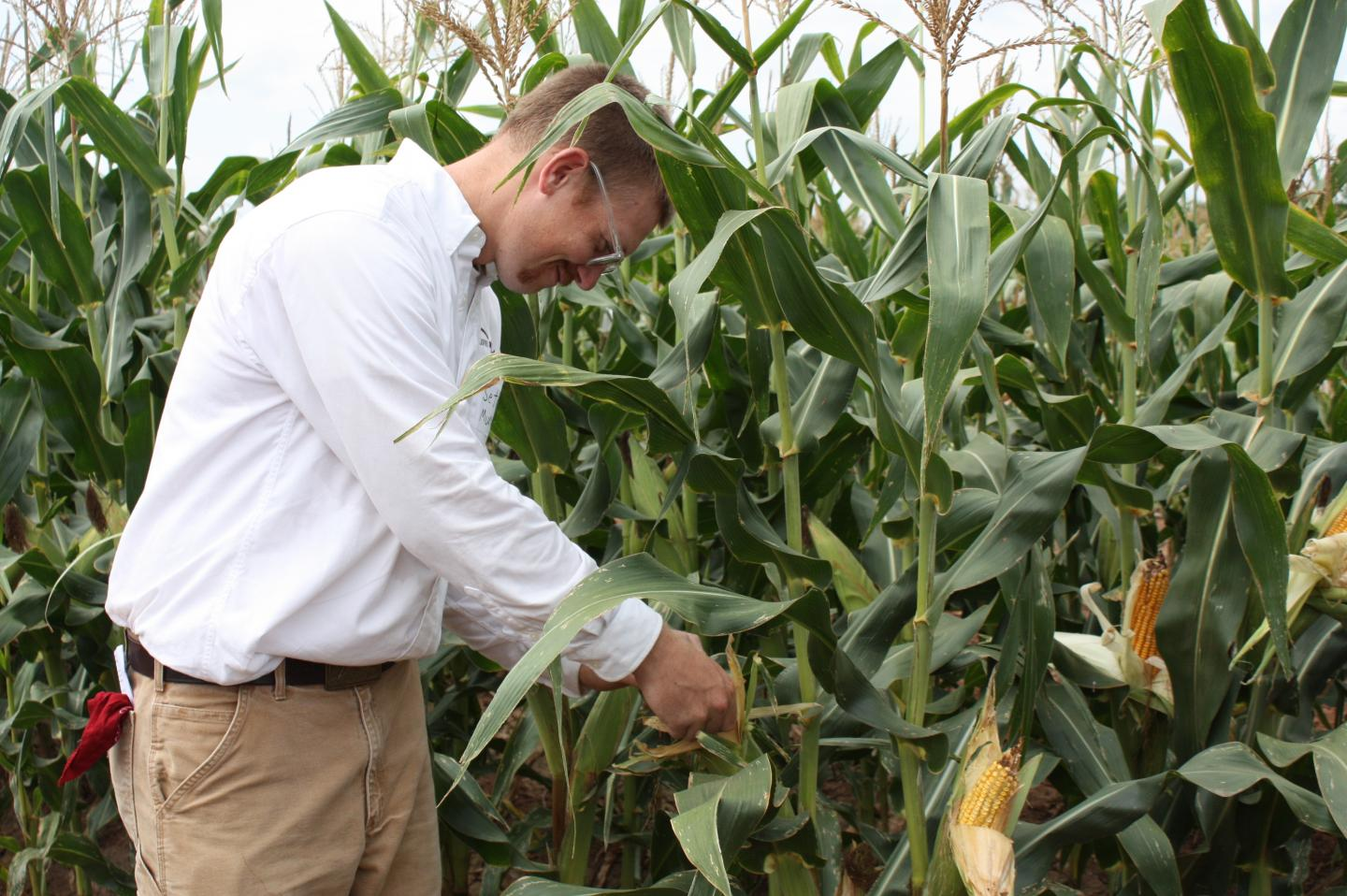
- Seth Murray examines a corn plant
- Born: 1980
- Citizenship: United States
- Education: Michigan State University, Cornell University
- Scientific career
- Fields: Plant Breeding
- Workplaces: Texas A&M
- Thesis: Genetic and phenotypic diversity in sorghum for improvement as a biofuel feedstock (2008)
- Doctoral advisor: Stephen Kresovich

Seth C. Murray is the Eugene Butler Endowed Chair in Agricultural Biotechnology at Texas A&M University where he directs a corn research program focused on quantitative genetics, phenotyping, and new variety development. In 2018 he was elected a fellow of the Crop Science Society of America.

== Education and career ==
Murray received his bachelor's degree from Michigan State University in 2001. He joined the research group of Stephen Kresovich at Cornell University, where he studied the genetics of sorghum varieties being developed for biofuel production. After his graduation in 2008 he was hired as an assistant professor in the department of soil and crop sciences at Texas A&M University, being promoted to associate in 2014, appointed to the Eugene Butler Endowed Chair in Agricultural Biotechnology in 2015, and being promoted to full professor in 2019.

== Research ==
=== Quantitative genetics ===
Murray was among the first to conduct both linkage mapping and association studies in bioenergy sorghum. These included mapping a gene controlling the average sugar content of sweet sorghum and identifying quantitative trait loci controlling the chemical composition of sorghum leaves and stems.

=== High throughput phenotyping ===
Murray's quantitative genetics research lead him to the conclusion that individual genes were not effective at predicting the yield of corn and so he instead began to focus on the "phenome" of corn, using UAVs and image analysis to track how corn develops over time. In 2017, Murray organized the launch of a new journal sponsored by the Crop Science Society of America and the American Society of Agronomy called The Plant Phenome Journal. He currently serves as the lead editor for this journal.

=== Developing new corn varieties ===
Murray's breeding program at Texas A&M is evaluating roughly seven thousand new varieties of corn each year. His breeding program is focused on producing corn varieties which are more tolerant of stresses and more resistant to the molds that produce aflatoxin. However, his is also working on developing perennial corn that does not need to be replanted from one year to the next. He is developing new hybrids using heirloom varieties from the US and Latin America by screening for which varieties produce better tasting varieties of whiskey. He has published that corn with higher levels of benzaldehyde tends to produce better tasting whiskey.

== Recognition ==
- In 2013 he received the National Association of Plant Breeders Early Career Award.
- In 2014 he received the Crop Science Society of America Young Crop Scientist Award.
- In 2018 he was voted a fellow of the Crop Science Society of America.
