= Benjamin Bussey =

American politician

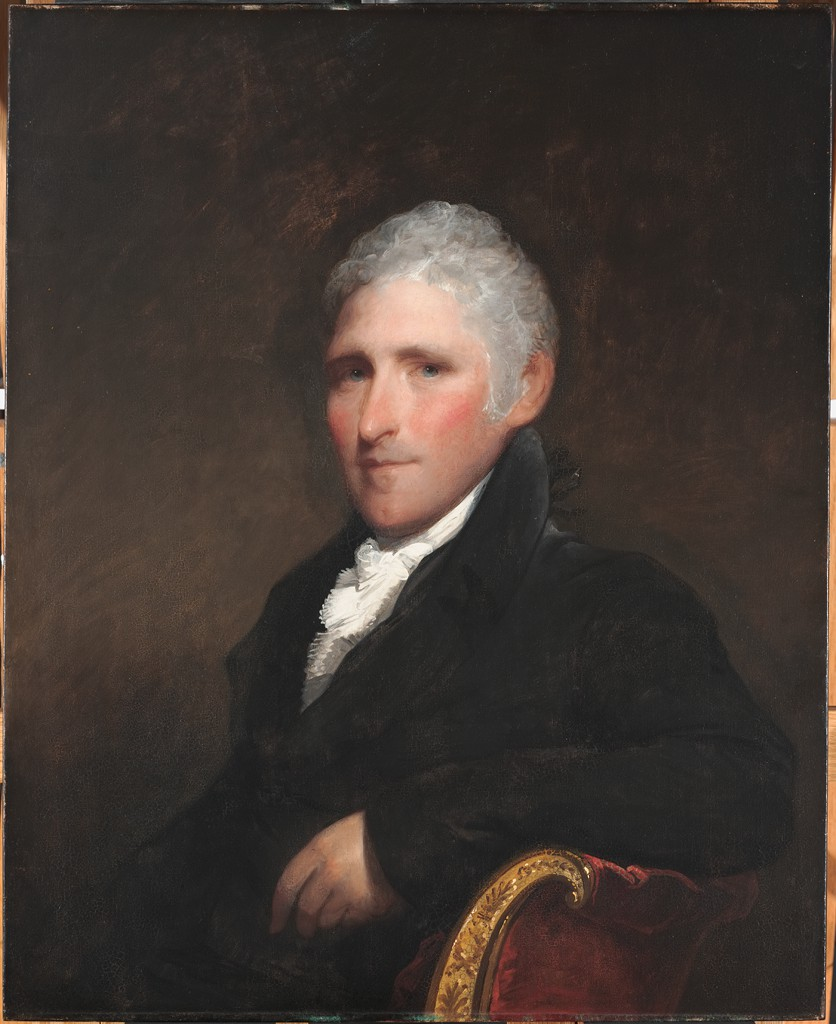
- portrait by Gilbert Stuart
- Born: March 1, 1757; Canton
- Died: January 13, 1842 (aged 84); Roxbury
- Occupation: Politician

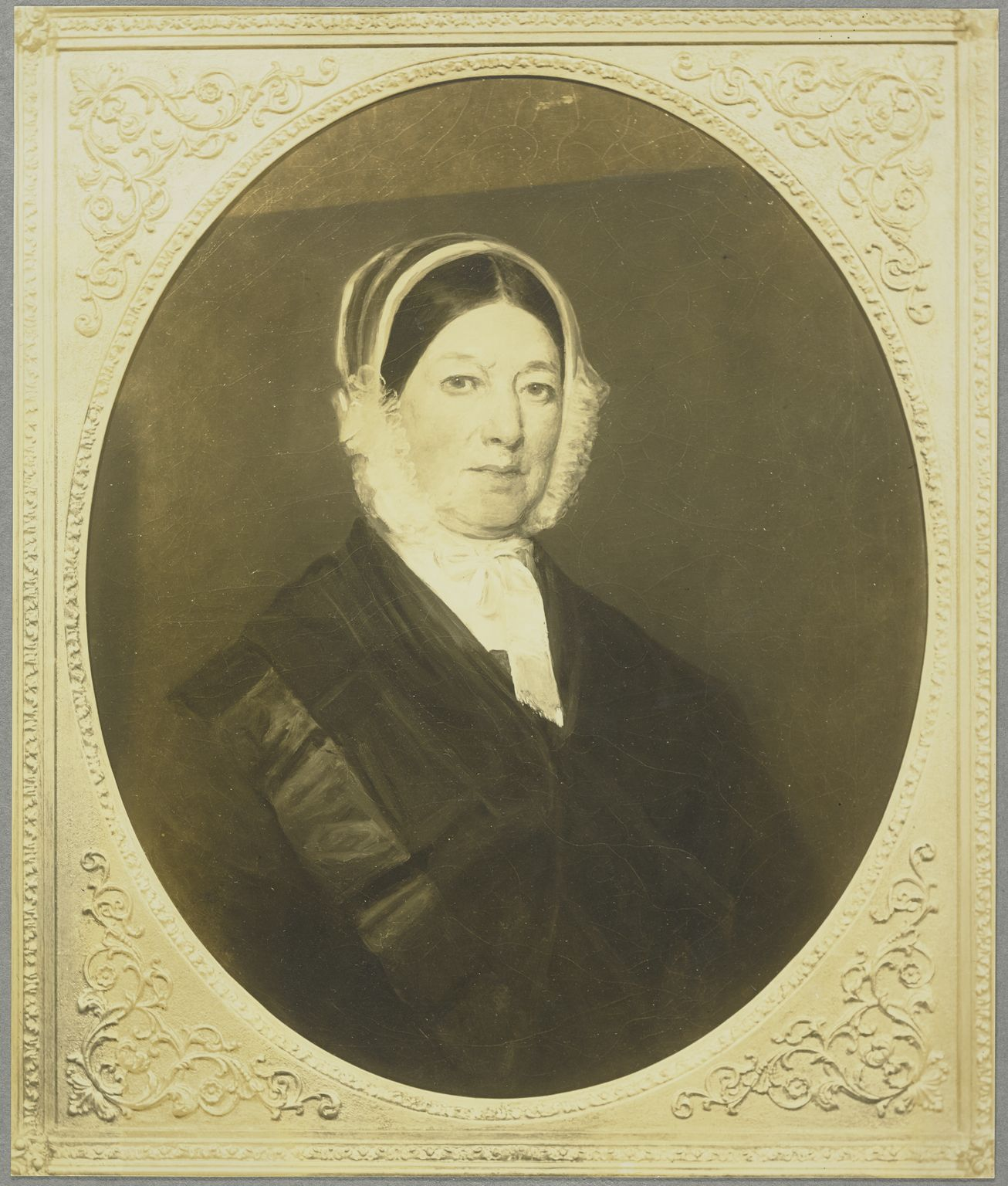
Bussey married Judith Gay in 1780. Portrait by Francis Alexander

Benjamin Bussey (1757—1842) was a prosperous American merchant, farmer, horticulturalist and patriot in Boston, Massachusetts, who made significant contributions to the creation of the Arnold Arboretum. He was said to be "a man of excellent business capacity" and "one of the wealthiest and most influential men in New England."

== Personal life ==
Bussey was born in 1757 on a farm in what is today Canton, Massachusetts, before it separated from Stoughton, to an impoverished family. He received only a basic education. After serving in the American Revolutionary War, Bussey moved to Dedham, Massachusetts.

He married Judith Gay of Dedham in 1780. (Note: Judith was from a wealthy farming family that owned Gay's Tavern.) The pair had two children. His son died of unknown causes at the age of 27, and he was estranged from his daughter, who predeceased him. He had a long friendship with John Quincy Adams.

In 1806, at the age of 49, he retired as one of the richest men in New England to a life raising Merino sheep on a 300-acre farm in what was then Roxbury, but today is now the Forest Hills area of Jamaica Plain. In 1800, he inherited additional land from fellow patriot Eleazer Weld and further enlarged his estate between 1806 and 1837 by acquiring and consolidating various farms that had been established as early as the seventeenth century. He named the estate Woodland Hill.

Around the neoclassical mansion, which featured wallpaper views of Paris and French furniture, along with damask drapes, Brussels carpets, and copies of Old Master paintings, Bussey practiced scientific farming. At his estate, he entertained President John Quincy Adams, then Vice President Martin Van Buren, and the Marquis de Lafayette, along with the other "great and good" of Boston society.

A bust of him at the Harvard Art Museums was made in 1830 by Shobal Vail Clevenger. The bust, which he commissioned, was later copied in marble in Italy. He also commissioned paintings of himself and his family by Gilbert Stuart.

Bussey wrote an autobiography. He died on January 13, 1842.

== Career ==
Bussey opened a gold and silversmith shop in Dedham in 1778 where he made spurs, spoons, and other objects from metal. To finance the endeavor, he received a $50 loan from his grandfather. He learned the trade from a Hessian soldier. According to his autobiography, his rule was "never to adulterate any metal and never to sell silverware inferior to [silver] dollars." Examples of his work, which include Neoclassical punchwork, can now be found in the collections of the Harvard Art Museums and the Dedham Museum and Archive.

As his business on East Street prospered, he soon added general merchandise. He purchased the house where his shop was located and lived above it after less than a year of working in the trade. (Note: This house may still exist, although moved from its original location due to the railroad line being built, and in a greatly altered condition, at 326 East Street.)

Between 1778 and 1790, Bussey accumulated $25,000 (roughly $700,000 in 2020 dollars). Bussey took the $25,000 he made to Boston in 1790 where he ran a shipping and trading company for 16 years at five different locations. He lived in a mansion on Summer Street surrounded by large gardens. He also opened a store on State Street. Bussey's mercantile efforts expanded from furs to include sugar, flour, cotton, coffee, and other commodities that he traded with Europeans. The goods crossed the Atlantic on ships Bussey owned himself. As a businessman, he almost never accepted or asked for credit, preferring to operate in cash only.

He continued to buy up plots of land in Dedham, eventually totaling 45 acres around his home and 150 acres at Connecticut Corner. He also bought and sold land in Downtown Boston, and eventually amassed large holdings in Boston, Dedham, and Bangor, Maine. Bussey also had a number of other business interests, including a private bank.

He left retirement at the age of 62 to return to Dedham where he purchased the Norfolk Cotton Manufacturing Company on Maverick Street along Mother Brook. Bussey had previously owned stock in the company. The War of 1812 had brought ruin to the company, and he purchased it in 1819 for $12,500, a sum far below cost. Bussey used the wool from his sheep, producing a high-caliber product that sold well.

Bussey then bought a failed woolen mill from the Dedham Worsted Company only three years after they opened on the street that now bears his name, for $20,000 in 1824. There he combined spinning and weaving under the same operation with unified management, creating one of New England's first integrated textile mills. Bussey brought in the best equipment and refurbished many of the old buildings. He was one of the first to install water-powered broad looms, enabling him to spin and weave the raw wool into finished fabric. It was said that the factories, dye houses, dwellings, and other buildings associated with the operation "of themselves constitute a little village." Bussey named the company the Dedham Woolen Mills.

In 1837, Bussey underwrote part of the cost of a library above Boyden's Store, which was also the mill store, for the benefit of the residents of Mill Village. It was known as the Bussey Social and Circulating Library and was only open to paying members. It failed after a few years for lack of support.

=== Relationship with slavery ===
Though Bussey was an abolitionist, and signed an anti-slavery petition in 1807, he was complicit with slavery in his professional pursuits. He shipped products to the islands of the West Indies, places where the land was considered too valuable to grow food for slaves. He also sent, in ships owned or financed by him, rough toe cloth that was used to clothe slaves. More than half of the voyages on his ships or those he financed were to provision these islands, where the slaves were often worked to death in the heat.

He also traded with the American South, purchasing tobacco and cotton grown by the enslaved and selling building materials and farming implements. He then shipped the raw materials from southern plantations to Europe, where he bought dinnerware, fabric, and other high-end goods.

When he lived in Boston he attended the Hollis Street Church and then the Third Parish of Roxbury when he retired to Woodland Hill. The pastors of both were active in the abolitionist cause. Rev. Thomas Gray, who preached at the Third Parish Church, was one of Bussey's closest friends.

In 1789, Bussey took in "James White, a Black boy" from Dedham's poor house as an apprentice. Bussey promised to educate White, teaching him reading and writing as well as to cypher. He also promised to feed and clothe the boy, and to set him up as give him a job as a nail maker when his apprenticeship was complete. Neiswander believes the Bussey was able to "compartmentalize, separating his beliefs from the business activities which made him rich."

== Electoral career ==
Bussey ran for a seat in the Massachusetts Senate in 1807 but lost. He was successful running in 1808 as a Federalist for the Massachusetts House of Representatives in 1808 and 1809.

== Legacy ==
In his will, Bussey made donations to many civic and charitable organizations. The executors of his estate include George Kuhn, his business partner, and John Quincy Adams.

He bequeathed his land and part of his fortune to Harvard University "for instruction in agriculture, horticulture, and related subjects." He also made large bequests to the Boston Public Library, the Boston Athenaeum, and the Massachusetts General Hospital. He also made bequests to other churches, including steeple bells. To the Hollis Street Church, he gave a pair of large, carved mahogany tablets with the 10 commandments and the Lord's Prayer enscribed on them.

Bussey, according to Daniel T.V. Huntoon, an historian and the minister of the Canton church, was to "live of life gilded misery, give to Harvard College what must now amount to a million dollars, because he could not carry it with him; and to the Hollis Street Church a set of the Ten Commandments, because he could not keep them with him." Kuhn, on the other hand, called him "public-spirited, generous, hospitable."

Though he called his mills along Mother Brook his most "valuable and productive property," he did not give any large sums of money to causes in Dedham. There is, however, a street named for him in East Dedham.

A plaster bust of Bussey by Shobal Vail Clevenger, 1830, is housed at the Dedham Historical Society and Museum. A marble copy is in the collection of the Harvard Art Museums, as is a portrait painted by Gilbert Stuart in 1809. Watercolor portraits of Bussey and his wife painted by Henry Inman in 1830 are at the Boston Museum of Fine Arts. Silver by Bussey is in various collections.

=== Arnold Arboretum ===
Harvard used his land for the creation of the Bussey Institute, which was dedicated to agricultural experimentation. The first Bussey Institute building was completed in 1871 and served as headquarters for an undergraduate school of agriculture. One half of the income from Bussey's estates and property endowed professorships and scholarships in the Harvard Divinity School and the Harvard Law School, while the other half supported the institute.

Sixteen years after Bussey's death, James Arnold, a New Bedford, Massachusetts whaling merchant, specified that a portion of his estate was to be used for "...the promotion of Agricultural, or Horticultural improvements." In 1872, when the trustees of the will of James Arnold transferred his estate to Harvard University, Arnold's gift was combined with 120 acres (0.5 km^{2}) of the former Bussey estate to create the Arnold Arboretum.

The arboretum's Bussey Hill and Bussey Brook (formerly Sawmill Brook) still bear his name. The adjacent Bussey Street was renamed to Flora Way in 2024. After the 2022 Harvard & the Legacy of Slavery report identified Bussey as one of Harvard’s largest donors connected to the slavery economy, activists led an effort to rename the street in honor of Flora, a woman enslaved on the nearby Dudley Estate in the 18th century.

== Works cited ==
- Tritsch, Electa Kane (1986). Building Dedham. Dedham Historical Society.
- Neiswander, Judith (2024). Mother Brook and the Mills of East Dedham. Damianos Publishing. ISBN 978-1-941573-66-2.
- Worthington, Erastus (1900). Historical sketch of Mother Brook, Dedham, Mass: compiled from various records and papers, showing the diversion of a portion of the Charles River into the Neponset River and the manufactures on the stream, from 1639 to 1900. Dedham, MA: C.G. Wheeler.
