= Plant genetics =

Study of genes and heredity in plants

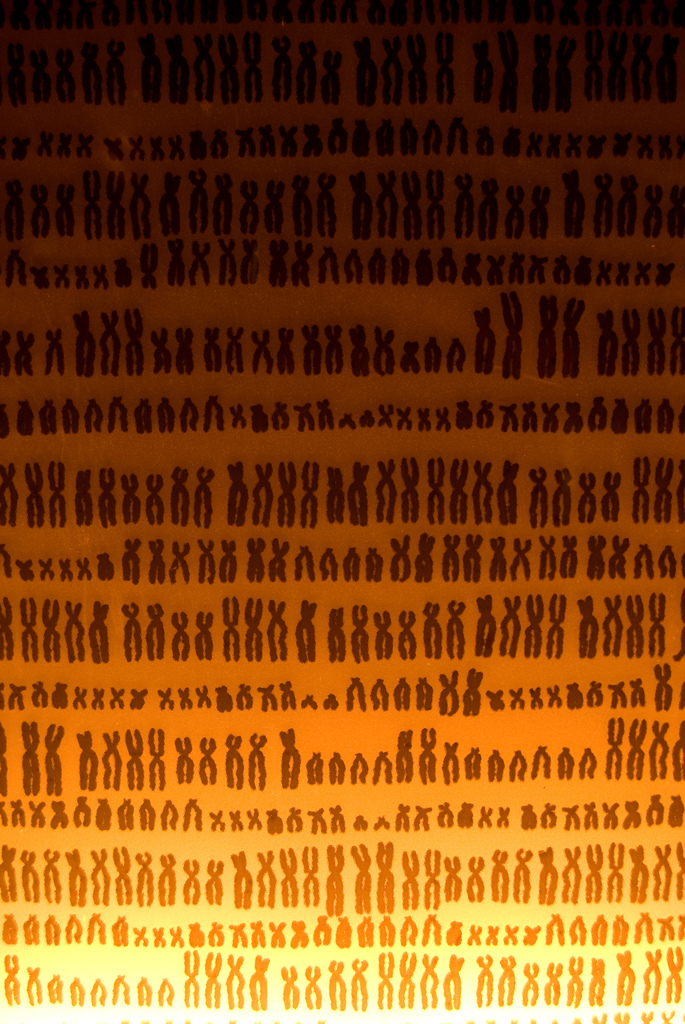
An image of multiple chromosomes, taken from many cells

Plant genetics is the study of genes, genetic variation, and heredity in plants. It is generally considered a field of biology and botany, but also intersects with numerous life sciences, including molecular biology, evolutionary biology, and bioinformatics. Plants are used for genetic research in a multitude of disciplines. Understanding plant genetics is used for improving crop yields, developing disease-resistant plants, advancing agricultural biotechnology and making advancements in medicine. The study of plant genetics has significant economic and agricultural implications. Thus, there are many plant models and genetic tools that have been developed to study plants. Genetic research has led to the development of high-yield, pest-resistant, and climate-adapted crops. Advances in genetic modification (GMO Crops) and selective breeding continue to enhance global food security by improving nutritional value, resistance to environmental stress, and overall crop performance.

== History ==
The earliest evidence of plant domestication found has been dated to 11,000 years before present in ancestral wheat. While initially selection may have happened unintentionally, it is very likely that by 5,000 years ago farmers had a basic understanding of heredity and inheritance. This selection over time gave rise to new crop species and varieties that are the basis of the crops we grow, eat and research today.

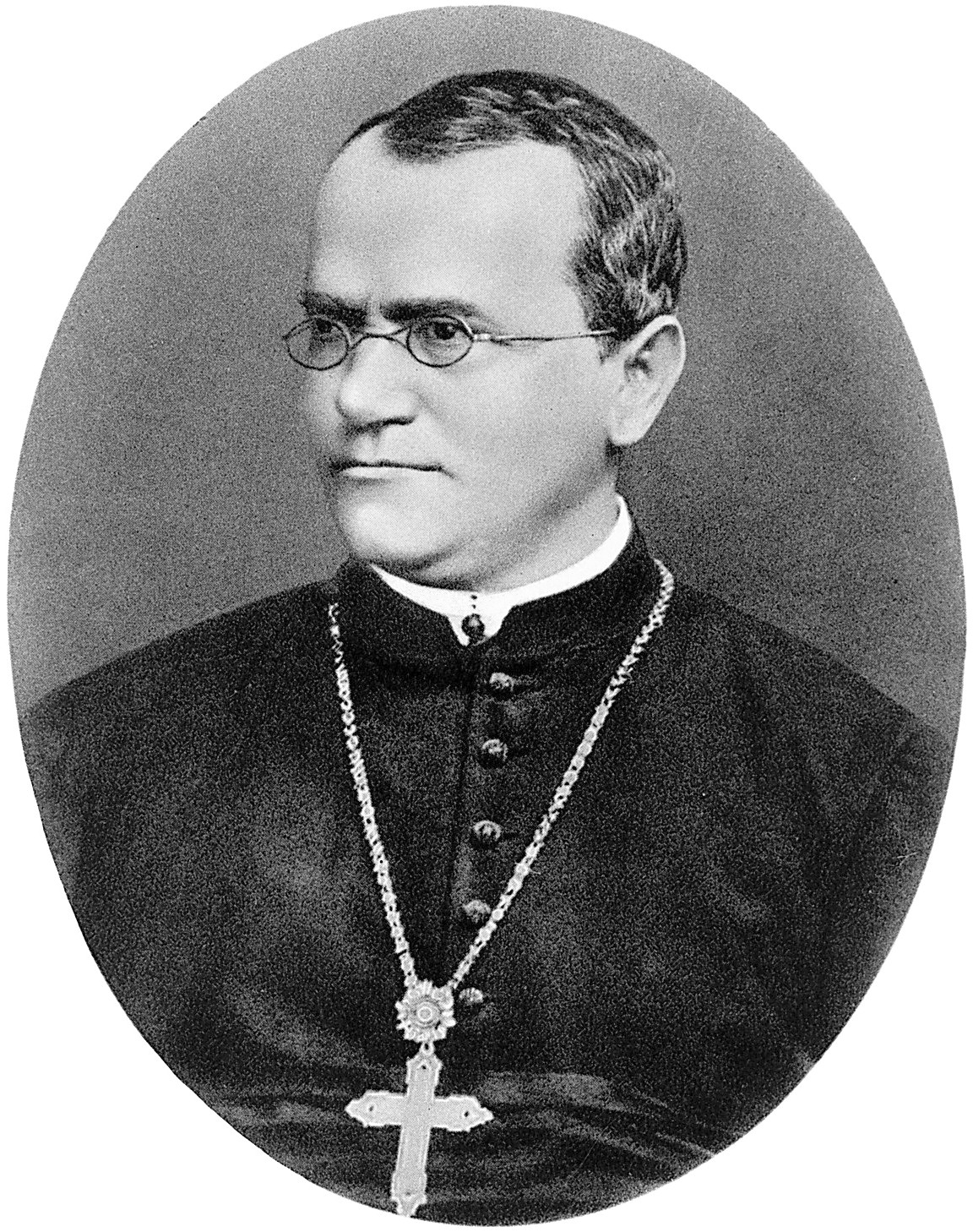
Gregor Mendel, the "Father of genetics"

The field of plant genetics began with the work of Gregor Johann Mendel, who is often called the "father of genetics". He was an Augustinian priest and scientist born on 20 July 1822 in Austria-Hungary. He worked at the Abbey of St. Thomas in Brünn (now Brno, Czech Republic), where his organism of choice for studying inheritance and traits was the pea plant. Mendel's work tracked many phenotypic traits of pea plants, such as their height, flower color, and seed characteristics. Mendel showed that the inheritance of these traits follows two particular laws, which were later named after him. His seminal work on genetics, "Versuche über Pflanzen-Hybriden" (Experiments on Plant Hybrids), was published in 1866, but went almost entirely unnoticed until 1900 when prominent botanists in the UK, like Sir Gavin de Beer, recognized its importance and re-published an English translation. Its rediscovery prompted the foundation of modern genetics as his discoveries, deduction of segregation ratios, and subsequent laws have not only been used in research to gain a better understanding of plant genetics, but also play a large role in plant breeding. Mendel's works along with the works of Charles Darwin and Alfred Wallace on selection provided the basis for much of genetics as a discipline.

In the early 1900s, botanists and statisticians began to examine the segregation ratios put forth by Mendel. W.E. Castle discovered that while individual traits may segregate and change over time with selection, that when selection is stopped and environmental effects are taken into account, the genetic ratio stops changing and reach a sort of stasis, the foundation of Population Genetics. This was independently discovered by G. H. Hardy and W. Weinberg, which ultimately gave rise to the concept of Hardy–Weinberg equilibrium published in 1908.

Around this same time, genetic and plant breeding experiments in maize began. Maize that has been self-pollinated experiences a phenomenon called inbreeding depression. Researchers, like Nils Heribert-Nilsson, recognized that by crossing plants and forming hybrids, they were not only able to combine traits from two desirable parents, but the crop also experienced heterosis or hybrid vigor. This was the beginning of identifying gene interactions or epistasis. By the early 1920s, Donald Forsha Jones had invented a method that led to the first hybrid maize seed that were available commercially. The large demand for hybrid seed in the U.S. Corn Belt by the mid 1930s led to a rapid growth in the seed production industry and ultimately seed research. The strict requirements for producing hybrid seed led to the development of careful population and inbred line maintenance, keeping plants isolated and unable to out-cross, which produced plants that better allowed researchers to tease out different genetic concepts. The structure of these populations allowed scientist such a T. Dobzhansky, S. Wright, and R.A. Fisher to develop evolutionary biology concepts as well as explore speciation over time and the statistics underlying plant genetics. Their work laid the foundations for future genetic discoveries such as linkage disequilibrium in 1960.

While breeding experiments were taking place, other scientists such as Nikolai Vavilov were interested in wild progenitor species of modern crop plants. Botanists between the 1920s and 1960s often would travel to regions of high plant diversity and seek out wild species that had given rise to domesticated species after selection. Determining how crops changed over time with selection was initially based on morphological features. It developed over time to chromosomal analysis, then genetic marker analysis, and eventual genomic analysis. Identifying traits and their underlying genetics allowed for transferring useful genes and the traits they controlled from either wild or mutant plants to crop plants. Understanding and manipulating of plant genetics was in its heyday during the Green Revolution brought about by Norman Borlaug. During this time, the molecule of heredity, DNA, was also discovered, which allowed scientists to actually examine and manipulate genetic information directly.

== DNA ==
Geneticists, including plant geneticists, use the sequencing of DNA to their advantage to better find and understand the role of different genes within a given genome. Through research and plant breeding, manipulation of different plant genes and loci encoded by the DNA sequence of the plant chromosomes by various methods can be done to produce different or desired genotypes that result in different or desired phenotypes.

=== Plant DNA ===
Plants, like all other known living organisms, pass on their traits using DNA. Plants however are unique from other living organisms in the fact that they have chloroplasts. Like mitochondria, chloroplasts have their own DNA. Like animals, plants experience somatic mutations regularly, but mutations within the germ line can be passed to offspring, aiding in processes like natural selection and evolution of plant species.

Some plant species are capable of self-fertilization, and some are nearly exclusively self-fertilizers. This means that a plant can be both mother and father to its offspring. Scientists and hobbyists attempting to make crosses between different plants must take special measures to prevent the plants from self-fertilizing. In plant breeding, people create hybrids between plant species for economic and aesthetic reasons. For example, the yield of Maize has increased nearly five-fold in the past century due in part to the discovery and proliferation of hybrid varieties.

Plants are generally more capable of surviving, and indeed flourishing, as polyploids. Polyploid organisms have more than two sets of homologous chromosomes. For example, humans have two sets of homologous chromosomes, meaning that a typical human will have 2 copies each of 23 different chromosomes, for a total of 46. Wheat on the other hand, while having only 7 distinct chromosomes, is considered a hexaploid and has 6 copies of each chromosome, for a total of 42. In animals, inheritable germline polyploidy is less common, and spontaneous chromosome increases may not even survive past fertilization. In plants however this is less of a problem. Polyploid individuals are created frequently by a variety of processes; however, once created, they usually cannot cross back to the parental type. Polyploid individuals that are capable of self-fertilizing can give rise to a new, genetically distinct lineage, which can be the start of a new species. This is often called "instant speciation". Polyploids generally have larger fruit, an economically desirable trait, and many human food crops, including wheat, maize, potatoes, peanuts, strawberries and tobacco, are either accidentally or deliberately created polyploids.

The main genetic components of plants include;

1. Nuclear DNA (nDNA): This is linear DNA or genetic information which is found within the nucleus. This DNA holds instructions for the function and structure of the organism its self. This information is organized into chromosomes and the nucleus serves as a control center for the entire organisms behavior, growth, and reproduction. Nuclear DNA content is a very important area of study in order to determine things like plant taxonomy, evolution and its conservation over time. This information is usually referred to as the organisms C-value and this data is remarkably variable among different plant species. Overall the study of nuclear DNA among plants and plant C-values is crucial for insight into biodiversity, adaptation and ultimately evolution of organisms.
2. Mitochondrial DNA (mtDNA): This is the DNA which is found within the mitochondria which are specialized organelles that produce ATP for important cellular functions and perform processing like metabolism, cellular signaling and apoptosis or programmed cell death. This form of DNA is exclusively inherited from maternal genetic information and is smaller and more circular than nuclear DNA. Mitochondrial DNA encodes around 13 proteins and is heavily reliant on information from the nucleus and their own genome for proper functioning. Extensive studying of mitochondrial DNA is very important for evolutionary research, migration patterns and insight into genetic disease.
3. Chloroplast DNA (cpDNA): This is genetic information found within the chloroplasts of plant cells. These specialized organelles perform photosynthesis for plants in order to convert light or photons into chemical/useful energy for plant growth and development. These chloroplast genomes usually contain around 60-100 genes that are involved in photosynthesis and other essential metabolic functions. This form of DNA like mitochondrial DNA is also maternally inherited which is advantageous to studying phylogenetics and evolution.

== Model Organisms ==
Model Organisms in the context of plant genetics are plant species that are well understood due to extensive research. This understanding of their genome and biological processes allows them to be used as a baseline to understand fundamental genetic, developmental, physiological and disease mechanisms. Discoveries from such research using a plant model organism is often able to apply its findings to other species including humans.

Plant model organisms are selected based on experimental advantages that vary depending on research objectives. Key factors influencing their selection include short life cycles, ease of genetic manipulation, and well-annotated genomes. Below, we review a few of the many plant model organisms that are widely used and their applications in plant genetics.

=== Arabidopsis thaliana ===
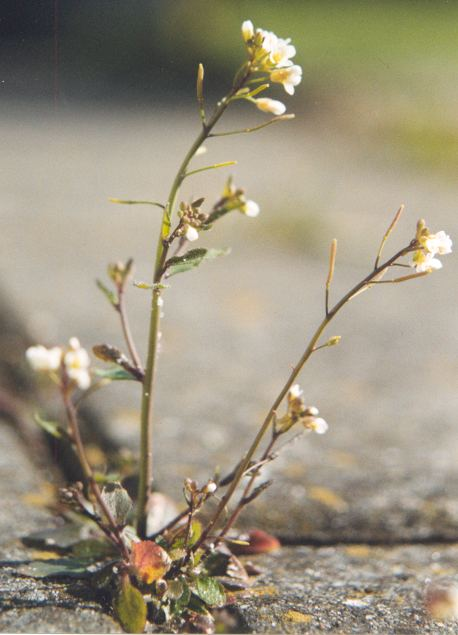
Arabidopsis thaliana

In 2000, Arabidopsis thaliana, also known as Thale Cress, became the first plant species to have its genome fully sequenced, solidifying its status as the most widely used plant model. Even before its genome was sequenced, Arabidopsis was a popular model organism due to its small size, short generation time, and ability to self-pollinate. These traits not only made it ideal for genetic research but also facilitated its genome sequencing. By 2000, researchers had identified 25,498 coding genes and a genome size of 125 Mb.

However, while the genome sequence provided a complete list of genes, little was known about their specific functions. To address this, the Arabidopsis 2010 Project, launched by the National Science Foundation (NSF) which, aimed to characterize the function of every gene in Arabidopsis by 2010. The project was largely successful and significantly advanced the functional annotation of most genes. However, some genes remained uncharacterized due to their redundancy or subtle phenotypic effects. Since, research has continued to expand our understanding of the Arabidopsis genome. To date, 27,655 coding genes and 5,178 non-coding genes have been identified, with research continuing today.

Arabidopsis is now the most well-known plant both genetically and in terms of function and has played a huge role in furthering molecular biology, medicine and genetic technology. One of the most notable applications of Arabidopsis is in Agrobacterium-mediated transformation, a technique widely used in plant biotechnology. Arabidopsis is particularly well-suited for this method, as its petals can be simply dipped in a liquid suspension of Agrobacterium, allowing for efficient genetic transformation. This approach has made Arabidopsis a cornerstone of genetic engineering since the petal dipping technique was refined in 2006. Since then, Agrobacterium-mediated transformation has contributed to advancements in many biological and medical contexts.

Due to extensive research conducted on Arabidopsis thaliana, a comprehensive database called The Arabidopsis Information Resource (TAIR) has been established as a central repository for various datasets and information on the species. TAIR houses a wide range of resources, including the complete genome sequence, gene structure and function, gene expression data, DNA and seed stocks, genome maps, genetic and physical markers, publications, and updates from the Arabidopsis research community. With ongoing discoveries and the expansion of resources like TAIR, Arabidopsis will continue to shape the future of genetic research and agricultural innovation.

=== Zea mays ===
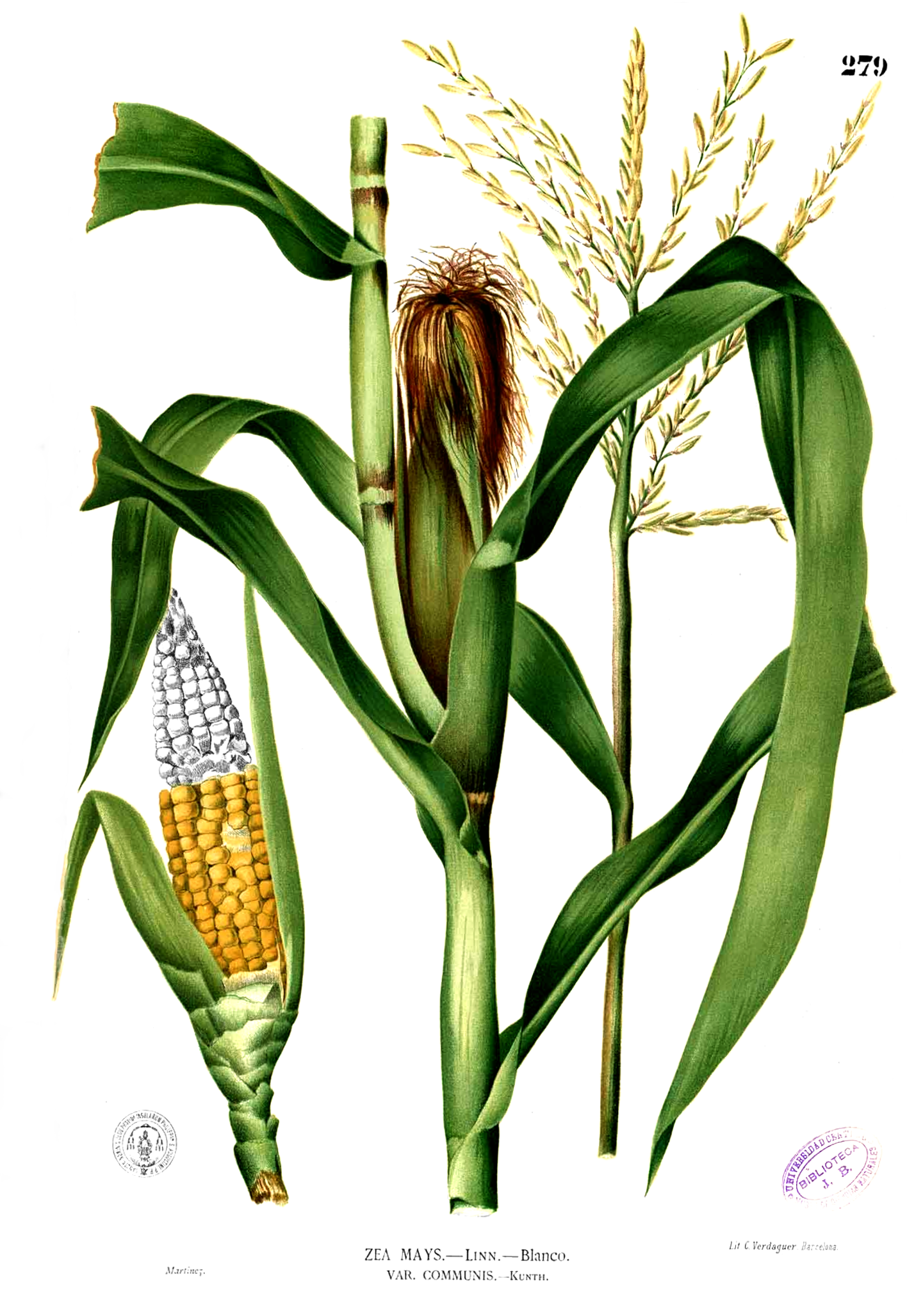
Zea Mays

Zea mays (Maize), is one of the most widely studied crops in plant genetics due to its economic significance and its role as a model organism for studying genetic variation, plant breeding, and crop improvement. Furthermore, maize has been studied since before the 1940s notably for the discovery of transposable elements by Barbara McClintock.

In terms of Maize's use as a model organism, it has a very high genetic diversity, even higher than that of humans. This has been caused by its extensive domestication history, which began thousands of years ago. This makes it a good model organism. Its genetic diversity allows researchers to study a wide range of traits, including those related to yield, stress resistance, and adaptation to different environmental conditions. The extensive variation present in maize enables scientists to investigate the underlying genetic mechanisms that control complex traits, making it an ideal system for functional genomics, quantitative trait locus (QTL) mapping, and genetic improvement of crops.

A major part of research involving Maize is for studying the mechanisms of C4 photosynthesis, which involves a complex network of enzymes, transport proteins, and metabolic pathways. C4 photosynthesis is a highly efficient form of photosynthesis that allows plants to thrive in hot and dry environments. C4 plants, including Maize, are able to concentrate carbon dioxide in specialized leaf cells, reducing the loss of water through transpiration and increasing photosynthetic efficiency. This adaptation allows C4 plants to grow faster and more efficiently than C3 plants under conditions of high light intensity, heat, and drought. By studying C4 in Maize researchers are trying to develop crops (both Maize and other C4 crops) that are more resilient to environmental stress and better suited for future agricultural demands particularly in the face of climate change.

=== Marchantia polymorpha ===
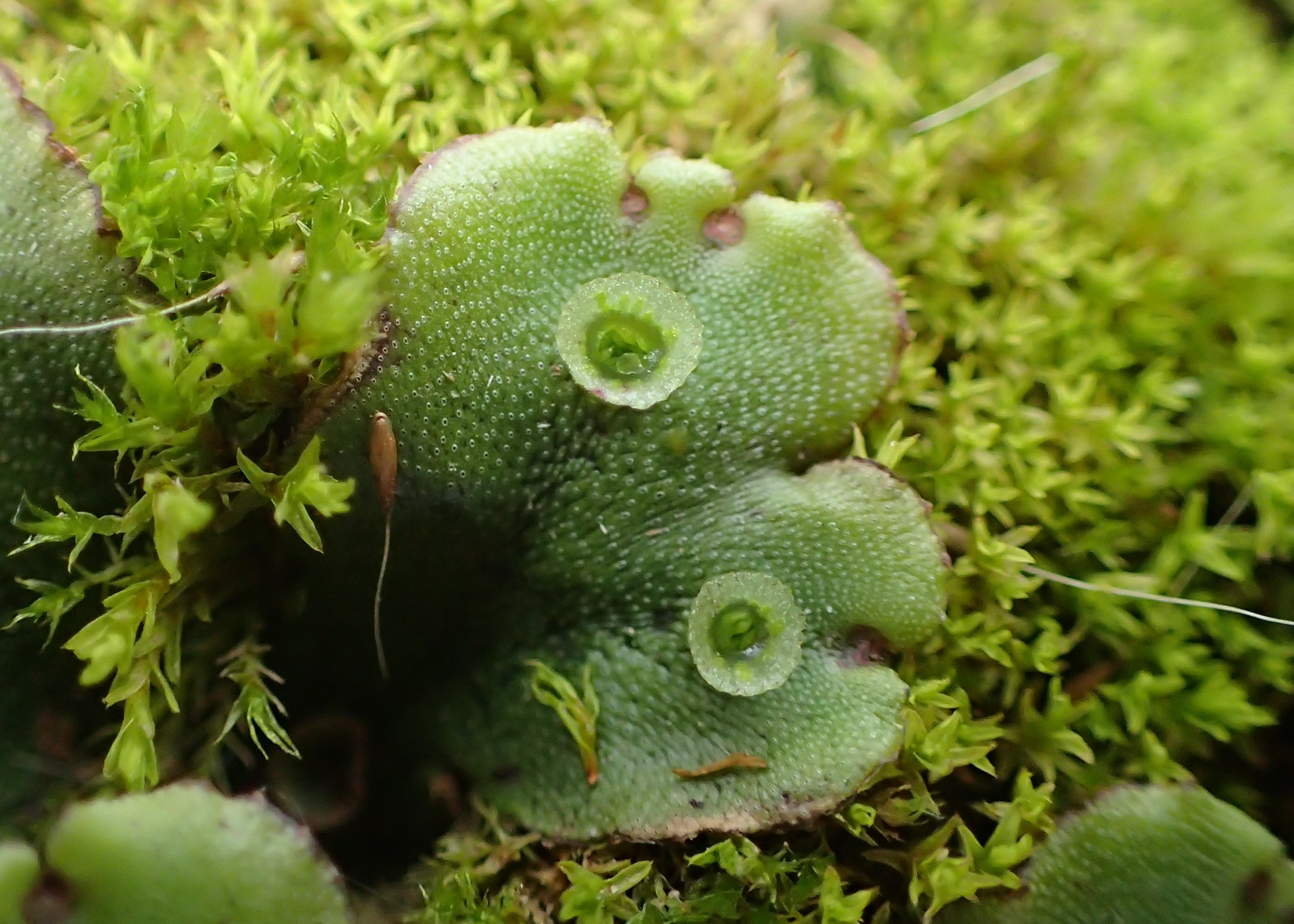
Marchantia polymorpha

Marchantia polymorpha, a liverwort has more recently become an important model organism for studying plant biology, particularly in the context of evolution, development, and stress responses. The genome of Marchantia polymorpha was fully sequenced in 2017, revealing a compact genome of approximately 226 Mb with a relatively simple gene regulatory network. Unlike many flowering plants, Marchantia has a haploid-dominant life cycle. This characteristic eliminates the production of heterozygous individuals, enabling more efficient and precise genetic manipulation and experimentation. Subsequently, the presence of a single-copy genome with minimal gene redundancy makes Marchantia an attractive system for functional genomics.

As a member of the basal land plant lineage, Marchantia provides insights into the evolutionary transition from aquatic to terrestrial plants. Liverworts like Marchantia are some of the oldest living land plants and thus, are essential to understanding the phylogenetics of plants. Using Marchantia researchers can and are reconstructing the genetic and physiological adaptations that enabled plants to colonize terrestrial habitats. This will allow us to have a better understanding of the origins of key traits such as desiccation tolerance, hormone signalling, and developmental plasticity which have many applications particularly in agricultural research.

Marchantia polymorpha continues to be a fundamental model for plant biology due to its unique evolutionary position, ease of genetic manipulation, and growing research tools. Its contributions to developmental genetics, hormone signalling, and stress response research have expanded understanding of early land plant evolution and offer potential applications in biotechnology.

=== Oryza sativa ===
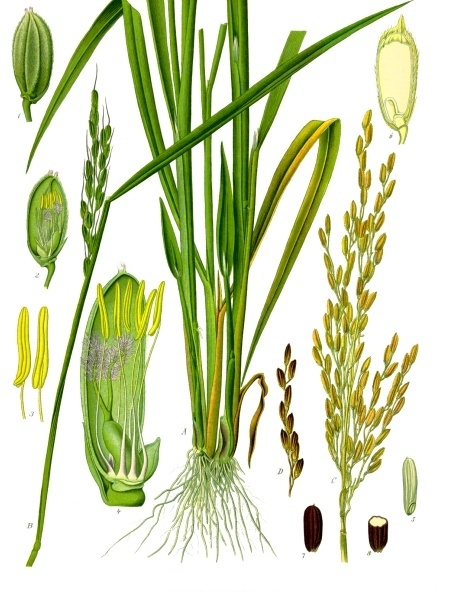
Oryza sativa

Oryza sativa, commonly known as rice, is a cereal grain and one of the most utilized staple crops worldwide as "a staple food for more than half of the world's population." Because of this agricultural importance, Rice has been extensively studied as a model organism in plant genetics.

In 2002, the rice genome was fully sequenced and became the first major crop species to have its genome mapped. Since then, the Rice Genome Annotation Project was created in 2004 "to work from a common resource so that their results can be more easily interpreted by other scientists." Between all the research combined in this database there has been 55,986 identified. This database combined with the amount of investigation and research using Rice has opened new opportunities for functional genomics. Subsequently, allowing researchers to identify genes associated with important agronomic traits such as yield, drought resistance, and disease resistance.

=== Brachypodium distachyon ===
Brachypodium distachyon is an experimental model grass that has many attributes that make it a model for temperate cereals. Unlike wheat, a tetra or hexaploid species, brachypodium is diploid with a relatively small genome (~355 Mbp) with a short life-cycle, making genomic studies on it simpler.

=== Nicotiana benthamiana ===
Nicotiana benthamiana is a popular model organism for both plant-pathogen and transgenic studies. Because its broad leaves are easily transiently transformed with Agrobacterium tumefaciens, it is used to study both the expression of pathogen genes introduced into a plant or test new genetic cassette effects.

=== Other model plants ===
There are many more Plant Organisms that each have their own advantages and disadvantages depending on the area of study. Therefore, researchers must investigate their options and select a model organism for use that best fits the uses and applications of their study.

== Genetically modified crops ==
Genetically modified (GM) foods are produced from organisms that have had changes introduced into their DNA using the methods of genetic engineering. Genetic engineering techniques allow for the introduction of new traits as well as greater control over traits than previous methods such as selective breeding and mutation breeding.

Genetically modifying plants is an important economic activity: in 2017, 89% of corn, 94% of soybeans, and 91% of cotton produced in the US were from genetically modified strains. Since the introduction of GM crops, yields have increased by 22%, and profits have increased to farmers, especially in the developing world, by 68%. An important side effect of GM crops has been decreased land requirements,

Commercial sale of genetically modified foods began in 1994, when Calgene first marketed its unsuccessful Flavr Savr delayed-ripening tomato. Most food modifications have primarily focused on cash crops in high demand by farmers such as soybean, corn, canola, and cotton. Genetically modified crops have been engineered for resistance to pathogens and herbicides and for better nutrient profiles. Other such crops include the economically important GM papaya which are resistant to the highly destructive Papaya ringspot virus, and the nutritionally improved golden rice (it is however still in development).

There is a scientific consensus that currently available food derived from GM crops poses no greater risk to human health than conventional food, but that each GM food needs to be tested on a case-by-case basis before introduction. Nonetheless, members of the public are much less likely than scientists to perceive GM foods as safe. The legal and regulatory status of GM foods varies by country, with some nations banning or restricting them, and others permitting them with widely differing degrees of regulation. There are still ongoing public concerns related to food safety, regulation, labeling, environmental impact, research methods, and the fact that some GM seeds are subject to intellectual property rights owned by corporations.

== Methods of Genetically Modifying Plants ==
Beyond the traditional approach of inducing mutations through chemical or environmental agents, various techniques can directly introduce modified genetic material into a plant genome, allowing for more targeted genetics research. This targeted approach is essential to the development of plants with specific traits such as improved yield, pest resistance, or environmental resilience. These methods vary in effectiveness and the time required to achieve successful transformation. A major challenge, however, in genetic modification is overcoming the plant cell wall, which acts as a barrier to foreign molecules, such as DNA. To address this, techniques have been developed to either temporarily disrupt or bypass the cell wall. Completely removing the cell wall poses the highest risk to the plant, as the cell may fail to regenerate. Additionally, even if transformation occurs, the inability to reform the cell wall renders the cell unusable. Therefore, alternative methods that maintain the integrity of the cell wall by bypassing it are typically preferred.

=== Microinjection ===
In this method, plant host cells are grown on a medium and then are injected with the DNA of interest using a very small needle. This approach allows DNA to be inserted into the plant cell without breaking or significantly disrupting the cell wall, effectively eliminating the need for cell wall regeneration, a process that is not always successful. Since the DNA is delivered using a needle, the injection site is highly specific, allowing a large amount of DNA to be inserted directly into a specific location such as the cytoplasm or nucleus. This precise delivery ensures targeted expression without the need for additional steps. Once the cells are successfully transfected, the cells can be reintegrated into the host. Despite the advantages of microinjection, the process is time consuming as each cell must be individually injected.

=== Electroporation ===
In Electroporation, plant cells are first grown in a medium that breaks down their cell walls, converting the plant cells into a protoplast. A protoplast is a plant cell that has had its cell wall removed, but retains all other typical components of a plant cell. Electric pulses are then applied to the medium to destabilize the membrane, allowing DNA to enter and integrate into the host genome. Afterward, the cells are removed from the medium and allowed to regenerate their cell walls before being reintroduced into the host organism. However, a major drawback is that many transformed cells fail to regrow their cell walls, rendering them unusable.

=== Particle Bombardment ===
Particle Bombardment, also known as biolistics, involves small gold or tungsten particles being coated with the DNA intended for transformation. These DNA-coated particles are then placed in a vacuum chamber, with the target plant tissue positioned below. The particles are then accelerated at high velocity into the plant cells, where the DNA then dissociates from them. Gold and tungsten are preferred for this process because they do not readily react with other biological molecules or cellular components which could harm the plant and/or trigger toxic effects. Once inside the cell, the DNA may integrate into the host genome, resulting in stable expression, or it may remain temporarily before being degraded, leading to transient expression.

=== Agrobacterium-Mediated Transformation ===
Agrobacterium tumefaciens is a unique species of bacteria known for its ability to transfer a portion of its genetic material into the genome of certain plants. This natural phenomenon is facilitated by a specialized plasmid within the bacterium known as the tumour-inducing (Ti) plasmid. The Ti plasmid contains two essential components that work together to facilitate gene transfer.

The first major component is the transfer DNA (T-DNA) region, which is marked by defined left and right border sequences. These borders play a crucial role in ensuring that the T-DNA is excised and transferred to the plant cell. Additionally, the T-DNA carries several important genetic elements, including oncogenes. These are genes that, when expressed, drive uncontrolled cell division. This abnormal cell growth results in the formation of crown gall tumors on the plant, which are characteristic of infection by A. tumefaciens.

The second essential element of the Ti plasmid is the virulence (vir) genes. These genes, once activated, are responsible for the excision of the T-DNA from the plasmid. They then mediate the complex process of transferring the T-DNA from the bacterial cell into the plant cell. Upon successful entry into the plant cell, the T-DNA is then further directed into the nucleus, where it becomes integrated into the plant's genome, leading to stable genetic modification.

This natural gene transfer mechanism has been harnessed and re-utilized by researchers for genetic engineering purposes. By creating disarmed strains of A. tumefaciens, strains that have had the tumor-causing oncogenes removed, researchers can safely leverage the bacterium's natural transformation mechanisms to introduce genes of interest. In this process, a modified plasmid is constructed that includes the gene of interest, bordered by the left and right border sequences typically found in the Ti plasmid. The vir genes, which are still active on the Ti plasmid in the A. tumefaciens, recognize these borders, ensuring that the target gene is excised and transferred into the plant. Additionally, the newly created plasmid is engineered to contain both a plant-selectable marker and a bacterial-selectable marker. These markers are essential as they allow researchers to identify and cultivate only those plant cells that have successfully integrated the foreign DNA, ensuring the success of the genetic modification.

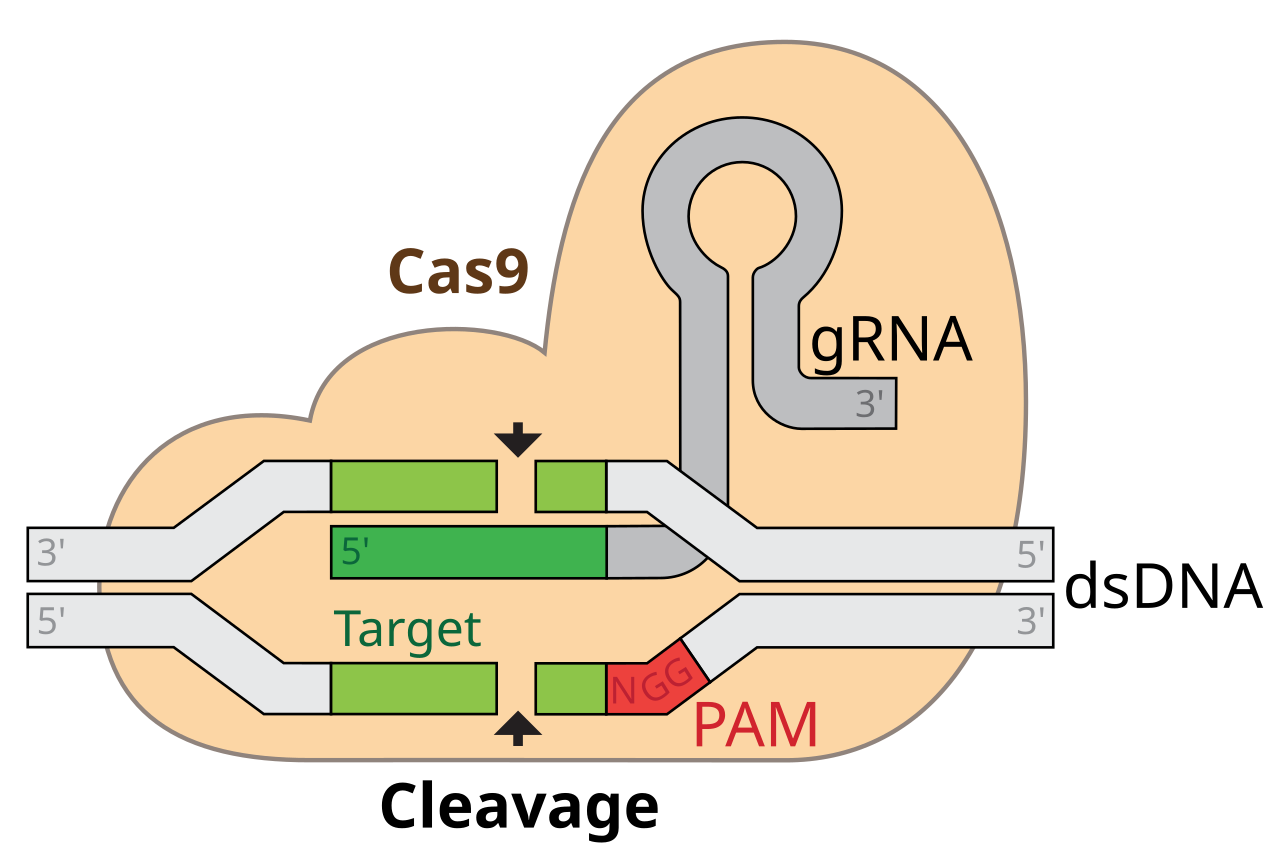
CRISPR-Cas9 Complex

=== CRISPR-Cas9 ===
CRISPR-Cas9 is a complex that edits the genome directly, allowing for greater specificity. Additionally, this method can be used in living cells, which is advantageous for assessing the impact of editing within an organism. While several types of CRISPR-Cas9 complexes exist, their overall structure is largely similar. The complex consists of two main components: guide RNA and Cas9. The guide RNA functions like a GPS, guiding the CRISPR-Cas9 complex to the correct target and enabling precise editing. It contains a single-stranded RNA component with the target DNA sequence, ensuring the complex binds to the intended location. Additionally, the guide RNA contains a double-stranded RNA component which is recognized and bound by the Cas9 protein, forming the complete complex. Cas9 is a nuclease that performs the actual cutting of the DNA. Genome editing via the CRISPR-Cas9 complex works by first recognizing the target DNA—the sequence you wish to edit. Cas9 then cuts the DNA, creating a double-stranded break. The cell then utilizes its own repair machinery to fix the break using one of two pathways: Non-Homologous End Joining (NHEJ) or Homology-Directed Repair (HDR). In the former method, the break is repaired using a sister template strand, a process prone to errors that can introduce mutations to knock out a gene of interest. In the latter method, a DNA template containing the desired gene is provided to replace the original sequence during repair.

== Current Plant Genetic Research and Applications ==
Advances in plant genetics are transforming the way scientists and breeders improve crops, offering tools that increase precision, efficiency, and responsiveness to environmental and market challenges. Current research focuses on multiple fronts, including molecular breeding, gene editing, transformation techniques, and synthetic biology, with the goal of building more sustainable, productive, and resilient agricultural systems.

=== Molecular Breeding and Genomic Selection ===
Molecular marker-assisted selection (MAS) and genomic selection (GS) have become central to modern crop improvement programs. These strategies enable breeders to predict and select plants with desirable genetic traits early in the breeding cycle, thus accelerating development. A key study demonstrated that using molecular marker-based methods like optimal cross selection results in higher long-term genetic gains and better maintenance of genetic diversity compared to traditional breeding methods.

Similarly, another scientific review emphasized that genomic selection—which combines genome-wide molecular markers with predictive models—can improve complex traits such as drought resistance, yield, and disease tolerance, even in crops with long generation times.

=== CRISPR and Genome Editing Technologies ===
One of the most significant breakthroughs in plant genetics is the application of CRISPR/Cas genome editing systems. These technologies allow precise, targeted changes to DNA sequences without introducing foreign genes. Recent reviews highlight the broad adoption of CRISPR for traits such as herbicide tolerance, improved nutritional content, and pathogen resistance. A 2023 review in IJMS further detailed how genome editing has been applied to improve crop architecture, flowering time, and stress responses across species like rice, maize, and wheat.

=== Gene Delivery and Plant Transformation ===
Efficient transformation techniques are essential for delivering genetic material into plant cells and regenerating whole plants. Classical approaches include Agrobacterium tumefaciens-mediated transformation, biolistic particle bombardment, and protoplast transformation. A 2023 review provided an overview of these technologies, noting challenges such as genotype dependency and low transformation efficiency in many crops.

To address these challenges, researchers have developed non-tissue culture-based transformation methods and novel delivery systems. A 2024 review highlighted the growing use of virus-based vectors, in planta techniques, and synthetic delivery systems that allow direct gene transfer into reproductive tissues, bypassing traditional tissue culture requirements.

=== Developmental Regulators ===
Recent work has shown that developmental regulators—genes that influence cell fate and regeneration—can significantly enhance transformation success. A study demonstrated that overexpressing the transcription factor PLETHORA5 (PLT5) improved transformation efficiency in both dicot and monocot species, such as tomato, cabbage, and snapdragon. These regulators promote stem cell identity and organogenesis, allowing more consistent transformation results across genotypes and species.

=== Synthetic Biology ===
Synthetic biology offers a new layer of control over plant traits by designing and engineering Synthetic biology is an expanding area of plant genetics that allows researchers to build novel genetic circuits and optimize metabolic pathways to precisely control traits in plants. One review describe how synthetic biology tools are enabling molecular farming—the use of plants to produce vaccines, biodegradable materials, and therapeutic proteins—thus transforming plants into efficient biofactories.

Additionally, an article published in Plant Communications emphasize the integration of artificial intelligence (AI) into synthetic biology platforms. AI tools are being used to model gene regulatory networks, design optimized gene circuits, and automate crop development pipelines. These approaches promise more efficient production of climate-resilient and nutritionally enhanced crops for global agriculture.

== See also ==
- Apomixis
- Biological engineering
- Cloning
- DuPont
- Experimental evolution
- Gene flow
- Gene pool
- Genetic erosion
- Genetic pollution
- Genetically modified organisms
- Ice-minus bacteria
- Monsanto Company
- Paratransgenesis
