= Edward Murray East =

American geneticist

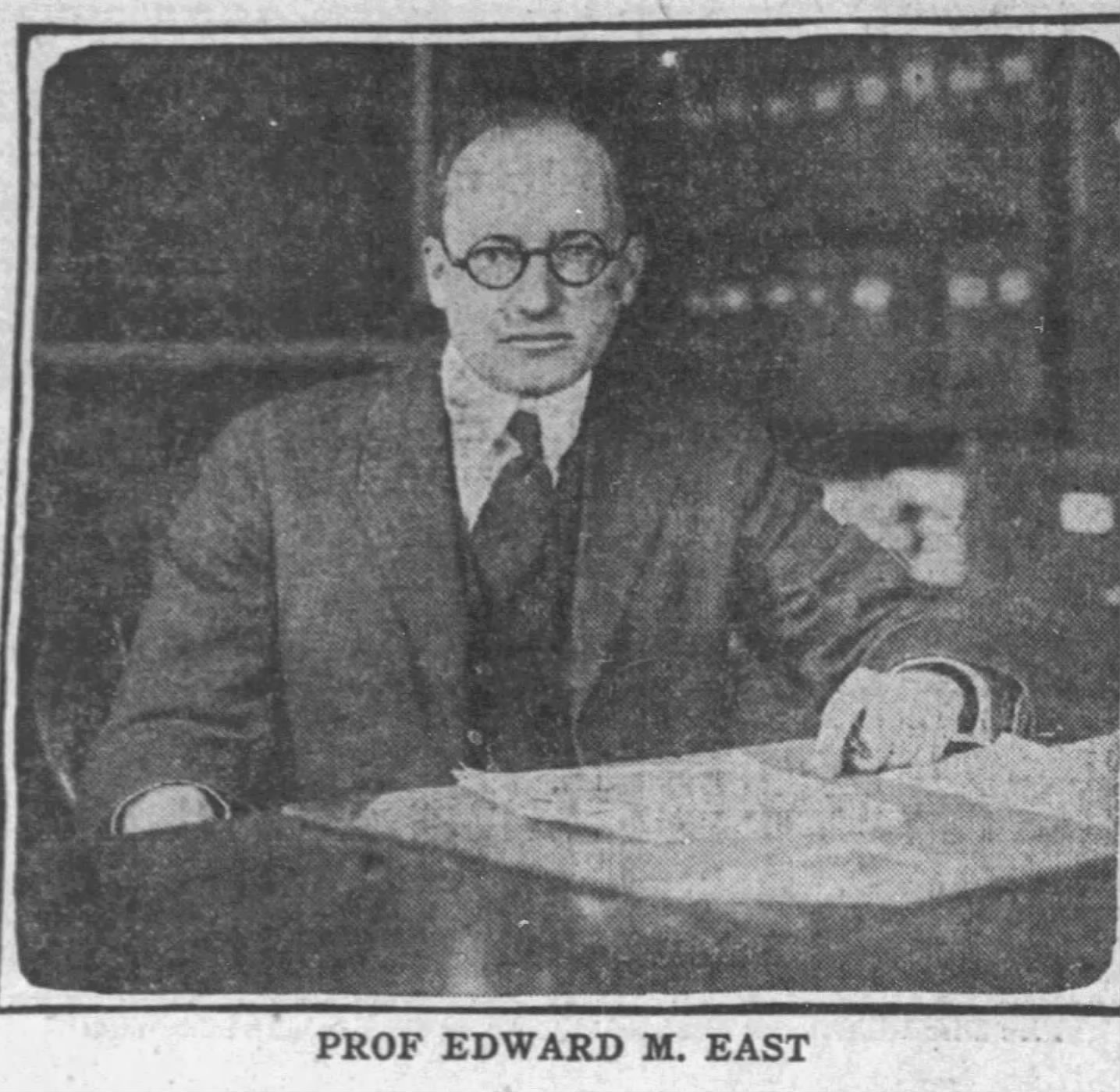
- Edward Murray East
- Born: October 4, 1879; Du Quoin, Illinois, U.S.
- Died: November 9, 1938 (aged 59)
- Education: University of Illinois
- Known for: Hybrid maize breeding; work related to eugenics
- Scientific career
- Fields: Genetics, Agronomy
- Workplaces: Harvard University; Bussey Institution
- Doctoral students: Rollins A. Emerson, Edgar Anderson

Edward Murray East (October 4, 1879 – November 9, 1938) was an American plant geneticist, botanist, agronomist and eugenicist. He is known for his experiments that led to the development of hybrid corn and his support of 'forced' elimination of the 'unfit' based on eugenic findings. He worked at the Bussey Institute of Harvard University where he performed a key experiment showing the outcome of crosses between lines that differ in a quantitative trait. He is also known as a critic of consumption and as a pioneer of thinking about environmental limits. While some scholars see his population thinking as nothing more than eugenics on a global scale, others see his population thinking as driven by environmental concerns, not eugenics.

== Work in eugenics and population ==
East was a prominent figure in early American genetics and a strong supporter of the eugenics movement in the United States. He was strongly influenced by the work of Thomas Malthus, especially Essay on the Principle of Population (1798). This influence led East to create many of his ideas concerning birth control and immigration policy. He applied many of the ideas that he had developed in his research on the applications of genetics to agriculture to his ideas about human society.

East wrote two major works on eugenics, Mankind at the Crossroads (1923) and Heredity and Human Affairs (1927), in which he compared groups of people based upon the racial categorizations of the time. In his book Heredity and Human Affairs (1927), he made quite a few pointed comments against interbreeding and miscegenation in the human species, stating that "the negro race as a whole is possessed of undesirable transmissible qualities both physical and mental, which seem to justify not only a line but a wide gulf to be fixed permanently between it and the white race".

Another principal concern of East's was the existing social policy, and his perception that it favored the "imbecile" over the "genius", and that the continued use of public funds to this end would have negligible value, if not directly causing harm.

East's ideas about population were separable from his views about eugenics, and differed from other Malthusians. Most Malthusian arguments, East noted at the beginning of Mankind at the Crossroads, had overlooked the most central issue: they “concern only birth-rates and death-rates, and… neglect the importance of agriculture.” Studying not just food supply but also agriculture was so crucial, East insisted, because the planet’s carrying capacity was declining. Historians of population have noted the prominence of Raymond Pearl and Edward Murray East in debates about population, mostly to point out their race and class fears, but have rarely stressed their emphasis on environmental limits.

== Work in biology: inbreeding and outbreeding ==
In 1919, Edward M. East and Donald F. Jones worked together on monographs on experimental biology, including a book on inbreeding and outbreeding and their genetic and sociological significance. This work covers reproduction among plants and animals, the mechanism of reproduction, the mechanism of heredity, mathematical considerations of inbreeding, inbreeding experiments with animals and plants, hybrid vigor or heterosis, conceptions as to the cause of hybrid vigor, sterility and its relations to inbreeding and crossbreeding, the role of inbreeding and outbreeding in evolution, and the value of inbreeding and outbreeding in plant and animal improvement. East and Jones explicitly considered inbreeding and outbreeding in man, their effect on the individual, and the intermingling of races and review the national stamina literature. In Inbreeding and Outbreeding: Their Genetic and Sociological Significance, East proposed the theory that inbreeding in a genetically diverse stock caused increased homozygosity. Believing with the Drosophila workers that most mutations were recessive and deleterious, East concluded that the increased homozygosity caused by inbreeding should generally be accompanied by detrimental effects. His theory also explained why inbreeding was not necessarily deleterious in all cases. Unless deleterious recessives were present, inbreeding caused no ill effects. Outbreeding of course had the opposite effect of increasing heterozygosity and was often accompanied by heterosis, or hybrid vigor.

In later years East continued to work on the physiological interpretation of heterosis and published a long paper on the subject only two years before his death.

The Jones and East book was well received, the theory presented with a wealth of evidence. It was widely read and cited by geneticists.

== Biography ==
East was born on October 4, 1879, in DuQuoin, Illinois to William Harvey East and Sarah Granger Woodruff. William had considerable mechanical skills and had studied mechanical engineering at the University of Illinois from 1875 to 1876. He then worked as a machinist, manufacturer of machinery, and chief engineer for a clay products firm.

When East was young he rapidly developed reading and writing skills. He diligently studied his collection of birds' eggs, which he purchased with money he earned working at the local grocery store. He acquired a .22 rifle, as did most boys his age, and became a very skilled marksman. After graduating high school at age fifteen he worked in a machine shop for two years developing mechanical drawing skills and shop methods. Here he saved money for college and eventually attended the Case School of Applied Science in Cleveland in 1897. One lasting impression the experience gave him was when a professor gave him a zero on an essay for making one mistake, an experience he often mentioned.

As East advanced in his studies, he decided that he was more interested in general science rather than applied mechanics. He transferred to the University of Illinois, and received his Bachelor of Science in 1900, Master of Science in 1904, and Doctor of Philosophy in 1907. During this time he met and married Mary Lawrence Biggs; they had two daughters. His master's thesis was in the study of the chemical and bacteriological studies on the self-purification of running streams.

East's first scientific position was as an assistant chemist in C.G. Hopkins' Laboratory. His job was to take chemical analyses of samples of corn. East was recommended to undertake the new work of improving the chemical compositions in corn, and accepted the appointment in Newhaven in 1905. Although he only spent four years at New Haven, he completed a lot work in that time. He continued intensive studies of the three economy plants: tobacco, potato, and maize.

Some of his studies done in New Haven were used in his submission of his thesis to the University of Illinois. His work on tobacco paved the foundation for his genetic work on the Nicotiana plant. His most notable research was with maize, where he discovered the genetic mechanism known as multiple factors. His work done at New Haven was on inbreeding and cross-breeding. His published paper "Inheritance in Maize" was the result of this work. The first inbred strains were grown in 1908. His first book, Inbreeding and Outbreeding, was on this subject. East played an important role in the development of hybrid corn. His main interest was in the theoretical interpretations from inbreeding leading to reduction and crossbreeding leading to increased growth. His ideas were developed further, led to the introduction of alleles, and were published in 1936 in Heterosis.

East was elected to the American Academy of Arts and Sciences in 1911, the American Philosophical Society in 1916, and the United States National Academy of Sciences in 1925.

Much of East's life was spent battling an illness.
