= Quality Protein Maize =

Family of maize varieties

Quality Protein Maize (QPM) is a family of maize varieties with enhanced nutritional quality. QPM grain contains nearly twice as much lysine and tryptophan, amino acids that are essential for humans and monogastric animals but are limiting amino acids in conventional cereal grains. QPM is a product of conventional plant breeding (i.e., it is not genetically modified) and an example of biofortification.

QPM was developed at the International Maize and Wheat Improvement Center (CIMMYT) through breeding programs led by Surinder Vasal and Evangelina Villegas, building on earlier discoveries of protein-altering maize mutants such as opaque-2 identified by Oliver E. Nelson Jr., Edwin T. Mertz, and colleagues in the 1960s. For their work on QPM, Vasal and Villegas were awarded the 2000 World Food Prize.

== Need for quality protein maize ==
In Central and South America, Africa, and Asia, several hundred million people rely on maize as their principal daily food, for weaning babies, and for feeding livestock. Unfortunately maize (corn) has two significant flaws; it lacks the full range of amino acids, namely lysine and tryptophan, needed to produce proteins, and has its niacin (vitamin B_{3}) bound in an indigestible complex. The Mayans and Aztecs used to boil maize in alkaline limewater, nixtamalization, which broke down the complex so that the niacin became available. However, in the main, this practice did not transfer to the Old World or settlers in the "New World" which resulted in epidemics of pellagra from the 16th century onwards. In addition, diets high in corn produce a condition known as wet-malnutrition – a person is receiving sufficient calories, but her or his body malfunctions due to a lack of protein. A chronic lack of protein in the diet leads to kwashiorkor.

Thus, conventional maize is a poor-quality food staple; unless consumed as part of a varied diet – which is beyond the means of most people in the developing world.

QPM produces 70–100% more of lysine and tryptophan than the most modern varieties of tropical maize. These two amino acids allow the body to manufacture complete proteins, thereby eliminating wet-malnutrition. In addition tryptophan can be converted in the body to niacin, which theoretically reduces the incidence of pellagra.

== Development ==
Modified maize with improved protein quality dates back to the early 20th century, but a major breakthrough came in the 1960s with the identification of the opaque-2 mutant by Oliver E. Nelson Jr., Edwin T. Mertz, and Lynn S. Bates. This mutation significantly increased lysine content and altered endosperm protein composition, demonstrating that the nutritional quality of maize could be improved through genetic variation. Subsequent work identified additional mutants such as floury2 with similar effects.

While its lysine and tryptophan levels were better than those of conventional maize, opaque-2 had lower yields and a soft, chalky kernel, which made it more susceptible to ear rot and insect damage. Moreover, the taste and kernel appearance dissatisfied consumers, who ultimately rejected the enhanced-protein varieties in the market.

=== Vasal–Villegas team ===
Surinder Vasal and Evangelina Villegas began their collaborative research in the early 1970s at CIMMYT, combining expertise in plant breeding and protein chemistry to improve maize nutritional quality.

Building on earlier discoveries of protein-altering mutants such as opaque-2 and floury2, they developed breeding strategies that combined the opaque-2 gene with genetic modifiers to restore hard kernel texture while maintaining improved amino acid composition. This approach enabled the development of agronomically competitive QPM germplasm adapted to diverse environments.

Although early opaque-2 varieties had poor agronomic performance and limited acceptance, continued breeding efforts at CIMMYT led to the development of QPM varieties with improved yield, kernel characteristics, and nutritional quality by the 1980s. These advances laid the foundation for wider dissemination of QPM in Africa, Asia, and Latin America.

However, adoption of quality protein maize was initially limited, in part because prevailing nutritional assessments in the 1970s emphasized energy intake over protein quality, reducing interest in protein-enriched crops. In the early 1990s, renewed international support enabled CIMMYT and partner programs to promote QPM in Africa and other regions. Since then, QPM has been adopted in parts of Africa, Asia, and Latin America.

=== Genetics ===
The opaque-2 mutation reduces the transcription of lysine-lacking zein-related seed storage proteins and, as a result, increased the abundance of other proteins that are rich in lysine. The lack of zein causes a soft texture, necessitating further development for "hard endosperm o.2" that lead to QPM.

== Impact ==
Quality protein maize (QPM) improves the nutritional quality of maize-based diets by increasing the availability of essential amino acids, particularly lysine and tryptophan, which are deficient in conventional maize.

Human feeding studies and later reviews have found that QPM can improve growth and protein status in maize-dependent populations. A meta-analysis summarized in a 2011 review reported that, compared with common maize, QPM consumption was associated with an average 12% greater increase in height and 9% greater increase in weight among children in community-based studies. Earlier studies also found similar nitrogen retention for opaque-2/QPM and animal-derived protein sources under some dietary conditions.

QPM has been deployed in multiple regions where maize is a major staple. A 2021 review reported that QPM varieties had been released in more than 23 countries by 2003, with about 3.5 million hectares under cultivation at that time, and in 34 countries by 2016. The same review reported that by 2019 QPM occupied more than 1 million hectares in sub-Saharan Africa, about 150,000 hectares in 12 Latin American countries, and about 250,000 hectares in Asia.
