= International Maize and Wheat Improvement Center =

International plant breeding organization

International Maize and Wheat Improvement Center Centro Internacional de Mejoramiento de Maíz y Trigo (CIMMYT)
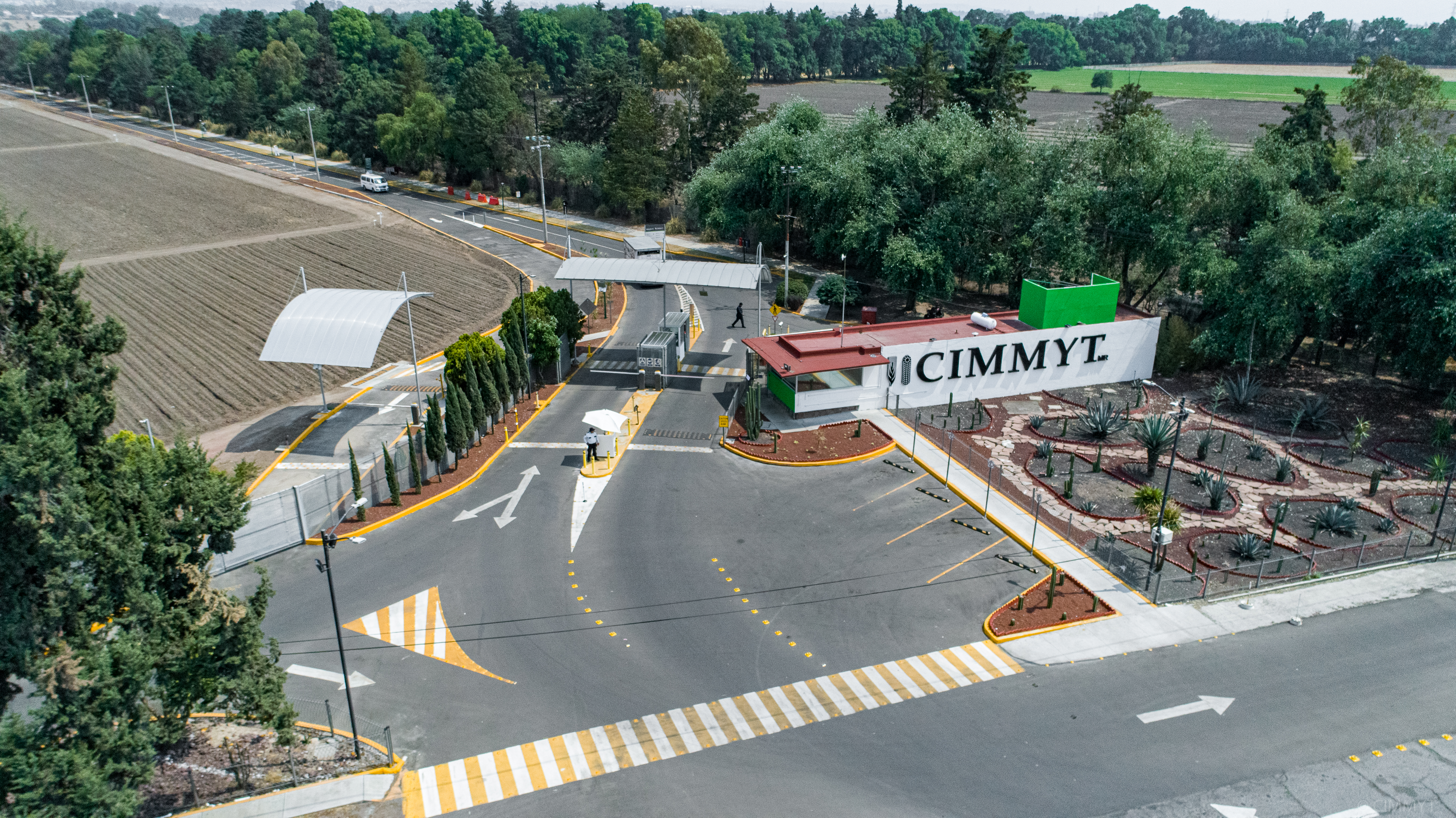
- CIMMYT in El Batan, Mexico
- Formation: 1943, 1966 and officially established in 1971
- Type: Non-profit research-for-development organization
- Headquarters: El Batán, near Texcoco, State of Mexico, Mexico
- Director General: Bram Govaerts
- Affiliations: CGIAR
- Staff: 1,600 staff members working throughout Africa, Asia and Latin America, and projects in over 40 countries
- Website: www.cimmyt.org

The International Maize and Wheat Improvement Center (known – even in English – by its Spanish acronym CIMMYT for Centro Internacional de Mejoramiento de Maíz y Trigo) is a non-profit research-for-development organization that develops improved varieties of wheat and maize with the aim of contributing to food security, and innovates agricultural practices to help boost production, prevent crop disease and improve smallholder farmers' livelihoods. CIMMYT is one of the 15 CGIAR centers. CIMMYT is known for hosting the world's largest maize and wheat genebank at its headquarters in Mexico.

CIMMYT's ninth director general, Bram Govaerts, replaced Martin Kropff in 2021. Other notable scientists like Thomas Lumpkin have served as director general of CIMMYT.

== Origins ==
CIMMYT emerged from cooperative efforts of the Mexican government and the Rockefeller Foundation that led in 1943 to the founding of the Office of Special Studies, an organization within the Mexican Secretariat of Agriculture. The goal of the office was to ensure food security in Mexico and abroad through selective plant breeding and crop improvement.

The project developed into a collaboration between Mexican and international researchers. It established global networks to test experimental crop varieties. One of its researchers, wheat breeder Norman Borlaug, developed dwarf wheat varieties that put more energy into grain production and responded better to fertilizer than older varieties. He was awarded the Nobel Peace Prize in 1970 in recognition of his contributions to world peace through increasing food supply. The program was renamed and morphed into CIMMYT in 1963, though it was still under the Secretariat of Agriculture's jurisdiction. As international demand grew and it became apparent CIMMYT required internal organization and increased funding, the center was reorganized and established as a non-profit scientific and educational institution in its own right in 1966.

In the early 1970s, a small cadre of development organizations, national sponsors, and private foundations organized CGIAR to further spread the impact of agricultural research to more nations. CIMMYT became one of the first international research centers to be supported through CGIAR. Today, CGIAR comprises 15 such centers, all dedicated to sustainable food security through scientific research.

== Activities ==
CIMMYT scientists support national research systems and work through small- to medium-scale seed enterprises to offer affordable, improved seed and sustainable farming methods to smallholder farmers. Though its headquarters are in Mexico, the center operates through 12 regional offices (Afghanistan, Bangladesh, China, Colombia, Ethiopia, India, Kazakhstan, Kenya, Nepal, Pakistan, Turkey, and Zimbabwe), as well as number of experimental stations.

CIMMYT's researchers promote the sustainable intensification of farming systems, for example, through the use of machinery that allows for resource-poor female farmers in Africa and South Asia to reduce labor costs and conservation agriculture practices such as no-till farming, which allows direct planting without plowing or preparing the soil.

CIMMYT hosts the largest collection of maize and wheat in the world: 28,000 unique kinds of maize and 140,000 types of wheat. Materials are made available under the terms and conditions of the multilateral system of access and benefit sharing, using the Standard Material Transfer Agreement (SMTA). A duplicate of these wheat varieties is stored at the Svalbard Global Seed Vault in Svalbard, Norway. Through CIMMYT's global breeding system and partner network, this genetic diversity is used to develop maize and wheat varieties that have higher yields, and can survive climate stress and diseases.

Last year, CIMMYT scientists have developed 70% of wheat varieties presently planted globally and about half of the world's corn, or maize, varieties. By CIMMYT's own accounts, the pedigrees of about half of the maize and wheat varieties sown in low- and middle-income countries carry contributions from its breeding research.

== Criticisms ==
Despite its noble goals of sustainability and self-sufficiency, one of the organization's founders and researchers, Nobel Prize recipient Norman Borlaug, has faced criticism. Borlaug's obituarist, Christopher Reed argued in an interview with The Guardian from 2014 that although his Green Revolution and high-yielding agricultural techniques averted poverty in the short term, in the long time they might have added to it. Critics of CIMMYT argue that it is important to consider the social and ecological changes that the Green Revolution, and subsequently CIMMYT, create for local farmers. According to critics, dependency on expensive 'high-yielding' seeds that demand expensive fertilizers has pushed local farmers who cannot afford them out of the market, causing further social inequalities and, in some cases, cropping intensification has degraded soils and depleted aquifers. At the time Norman Borlaug began the Green Revolution, the US agricultural science establishment and agribusiness industries supported him because it allowed their industries to grow around the world as dependency on their patented seeds and herbicides increased. Nonetheless, in contrast to the preceding observations, which are sourced from the popular press, a widely cited 2003 article in the peer-reviewed journal Science notes that "...it is unclear what alternative scenario would have allowed developing countries to meet, with lower environmental impact, the human needs posed by the massive population expansion of the 20th century." Today, CIMMYT still works closely with both public and private partners, including seed companies, to foster farmers' access to seed of improved varieties and agro-chemicals of their choice. One example is "StrigAway," a herbicide-coated maize seed variety that combats Striga, a parasitic weed that infests up to 50 million hectares of Sub-Saharan African land. Much of the wheat seed in the South is produced by the public sector; in the case of maize, seed companies play a key role in seed production and marketing. CIMMYT maize and wheat breeding are available free of charge to public and private partners, as international public goods.

== Partners and funders ==
Main funders include Bill & Melinda Gates Foundation, CGIAR, Foundation for Food and Agriculture Research (FFAR), OCP Group and the national governments of Australia, Britain, Canada, China, Germany, Mexico, Norway and the United States.

Historically, CIMMYT received funding from the European Commission and the Rockefeller Foundation.

== Notable scientists ==
- Norman Borlaug (1914–2009) – Wheat breeder. Recipient of the Nobel Peace Prize in 1970. Established the World Food Prize in 1986.
- Sanjaya Rajaram (1943–2021) – Recipient of the World Food Prize in 2014.
- Surinder Vasal (born 1938) – Recipient of the World Food Prize in 2000.
- Evangelina Villegas (1924–2017) – Biochemist whose work with maize led to the development of quality protein maize (QPM). Recipient of the World Food Prize in 2000.

== See also ==
- CGIAR
- Green Revolution
