= Pedro de Villegas Marmolejo =

Spanish sculptor and painter

Pedro de Villegas Marmolejo (1519–1596) was a Spanish sculptor and painter of the Renaissance period.

He was born at Seville, but studied painting from either Roman or Flemish models. He painted a Visitation to Elizabeth for the Seville Cathedral which resembles the manner of Pedro Campaña. In the side compartments of the altar there are various smaller works of Villegas, representing San Blas and The Baptism of Christ, St. Sebastian and St. Roque; above, in the arch, there is an Infant Jesus in glory; and immediately beneath the Visitation are some small portraits touched with a sparkling and animated pencil. He likewise painted, for the Hospital of the Lazarines, just outside Seville, St. Lazarus. He painted for the church of San Lorenzo an Annunciation and a Virgin and Child. His tomb bears this inscription from his close friend and polymath, Benito Arias Montano :

"DEO VIVENTIUM.
PETRO VILLEGAE MARMOLEJO HISPALEN.
PICTORI SOLERTISS. MORIB. INTEGERRIM. :SENSU ET SERMONE OPPORTUNISSIMO.
ANNOR. LXXVII.
ARIAS MONTANUS AMIC. VETER. UNI
SOLI EX TESTAMENTO POS. VIATOR PACEM VOVETO
M. PEREZ ARCHITECTUS AMICITIAE ERGO
INCIDEB.
A CHR. N. CICICXCVII."
