= Río Villegas =

Coordinates: 41°34′S 71°32′W

- Municipality and village
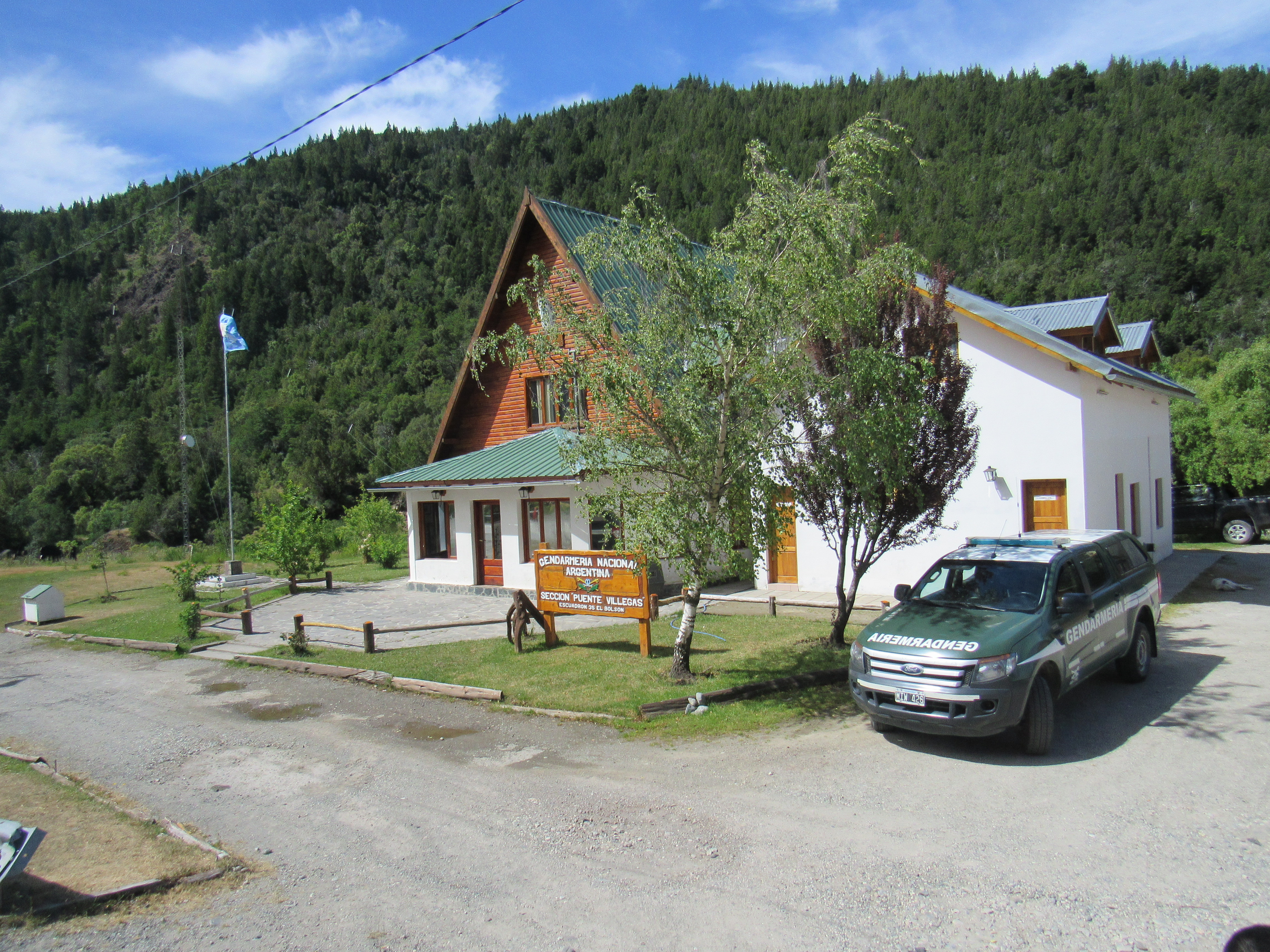
- A place in Río Villegas
- Interactive map of Río Villegas
- Country: Argentina
- Province: Río Negro Province
- Time zone: UTC−3 (ART)

Río Villegas is a village and municipality in Río Negro Province in Argentina.
