= Bussey Institution =

Bussey Institute
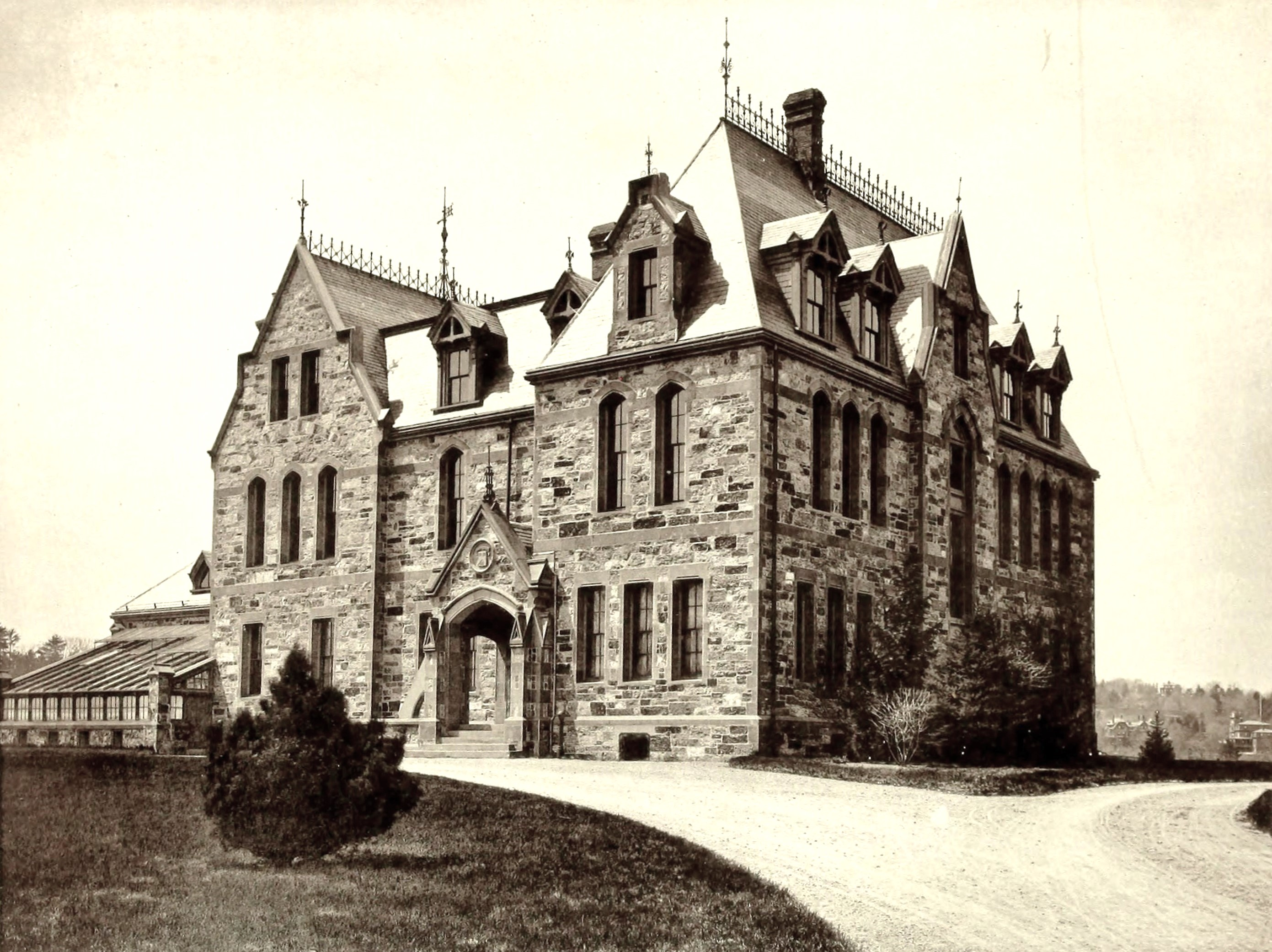
- Interactive map of the Bussey Institute area

General information
- Location: Jamaica Plain, Boston, Massachusetts, 305 South St.
- Named for: Benjamin Bussey
- Opened: 1871
- Closed: 1936
- Demolished: 1971
- Affiliation: Harvard University

Design and construction
- Architect: Peabody & Stearns

The Bussey Institute (1883–1936) was a respected biological institute at Harvard University. It was named for Benjamin Bussey, who, in 1835, endowed the establishment of an undergraduate school of agriculture and horticulture and donated land in Jamaica Plain, Massachusetts that became the Arnold Arboretum. Bussey, a silversmith, had bought the land from the Weld family in 1806, and built a mansion in 1815. When he died, he left 300 acres (1.2 km^{2}) to Harvard. By 1871 the Bussey Institute had been built to a design by Peabody & Stearns.

== Location and infrastructure ==
The building that housed the Bussey Institution was a Gothic Revival structure erected on Bussey Hill beginning in 1871, in accordance with the terms of Benjamin Bussey's will. After the Bussey Institution closed as an active academic body in 1936, its Jamaica Plain buildings were taken over during World War II by the U.S. Army Medical Corps, and the Massachusetts Department of Public Health had already been using the site since the 1890s to produce diphtheria antitoxin. By 1947 the Bussey buildings had become home to the state's Diagnostic Laboratories, and by 1963 the state needed more room and arranged the purchase of the former Bussey Institution grounds and buildings from Harvard University.

When construction of the new State Laboratory Institute began in 1969, efforts were made to preserve the old Gothic Bussey Institution building, but funding was not available for its restoration. The building was destructed due to a devastating fire and the remains were demolished in 1971. The new state public health complex that replaced it is now the William A. Hinton State Laboratory.

== Notable alumni ==
- James Drummond Dole obtained a bachelor in agriculture at the Bussey Institute before moving to Hawaii and developing pineapple production and the canning industry there.
- Alfred Kinsey, an American biologist who became famous for his work on human sexuality, studied at the Bussey Institute under famed entomologist William Morton Wheeler.
- Edward Murray East, a pioneer in plant genetics, also worked there when he studied Mendelian inheritance.
- William E. Castle, a geneticist worked there from 1908 until it closed in 1936, first on the genetics of fruit flies and also on hooded rats, studying basic evolution.
