= Liga Georgina de Villegas =

Liga Georgina de Villegas is a basketball league from San Pedro Sula, Honduras. Even though based in San Pedro Sula, it is referred to as the metropolitan league because it includes teams from La Lima, El Progreso and La Ceiba. It is considered the top league in the north and one of the most elite in the country.

It is actually comprised both by a male and a female league. The male league is divided into two divisions with a promotion and relegation system every year.

== 2008 season ==
=== The current champions ===
Division I – Vida
Division II- El Progreso
Female- Sunset

=== Teams in the 2008 season ===
Division I
Vida
Arle
Profit Lima
SET
Emeco
Reenfrío

Division II
Phoenix
Mercaplán
Fol Dorados
Europlast
EIS 1
Progreso
Arlef Júnior
Onda Sport
EIS 2

'Women's
Susent
Monolit
Inmude
Imapro
EIS
