= Donald F. Jones =

American geneticist

Donald Forsha Jones
- Born: April 16, 1890
- Died: June 19, 1963 (aged 73)
- Education: Kansas State University; Syracuse University; Harvard University
- Known for: Development of the double-cross hybrid method in maize
- Awards: National Academy of Sciences (1939); American Academy of Arts and Sciences (1934)
- Scientific career
- Fields: Genetics
- Workplaces: Connecticut Agricultural Experiment Station
- Doctoral advisor: Edward M. East

Donald Forsha Jones (April 16, 1890 – June 19, 1963) was an American maize geneticist and plant breeder at the Connecticut Agricultural Experiment Station in New Haven. He is best known for developing the double-cross hybrid method, which made large-scale production of high-yielding hybrid maize commercially practical and transformed twentieth-century agriculture.

Jones joined the Connecticut Agricultural Experiment Station in 1914 and spent his entire career there, becoming one of the leading figures in early maize genetics. His work enabled the widespread commercialization of hybrid maize in the 1920s and 1930s and contributed substantially to increased agricultural productivity in the United States.

In addition to his contributions to hybrid breeding, Jones conducted foundational studies on inbreeding, heterosis, and endosperm development in maize. He was the sole geneticist at the station from 1915 to 1921, after which Paul Mangelsdorf joined as his assistant. Jones trained and influenced a generation of maize geneticists, including Oliver E. Nelson Jr., who later made major contributions to maize genetics and endosperm biology.

Jones served as president of the Genetics Society of America in 1935 and was elected to the American Academy of Arts and Sciences in 1934 and the National Academy of Sciences in 1939.

== Early life and education ==
Jones was born in 1890. He received his undergraduate degree from Kansas State Agricultural College and later earned graduate degrees from Syracuse University and Harvard University, where he studied under Edward M. East, a pioneer in maize genetics.

== Scientific contributions ==
Jones' most influential contribution was the development of the double-cross hybrid method, which built on earlier work on heterosis by George Harrison Shull and Edward Murray East. While Shull and East had demonstrated that crosses between inbred lines could produce vigorous hybrid offspring, the low seed yield of inbred lines made commercial production impractical. Jones solved this problem by crossing two single-cross hybrids derived from four inbred lines, producing a double-cross hybrid that combined high yield with sufficient seed production for large-scale agriculture.

This innovation enabled the widespread adoption of hybrid maize in the United States during the 1920s and 1930s and became widely used in plant breeding. Jones' work helped establish hybrid breeding as a practical agricultural technology and complemented parallel advances by contemporaries including Paul Mangelsdorf and other early maize geneticists.

In addition to his work on hybridization, Jones conducted important studies on inbreeding depression, heterosis, and the genetic control of endosperm development in maize, contributing to the development of plant genetics as an experimental discipline in the early twentieth century.

== Selected publications ==
- Jones, D. F. (1944). "Growth changes in maize endosperm associated with the relocation of chromosome parts". Genetics. 29 (5): 420–427. doi:10.1093/genetics/29.5.420. PMC 1209256. PMID 17247130.
- Jones, D. F. (1939). "Continued inbreeding in maize". Genetics. 24 (4): 462–473. doi:10.1093/genetics/24.4.462. PMC 1209049. PMID 17246933.
- Jones, D. F. (1936). "The mutation rate in somatic cells of maize". Proceedings of the National Academy of Sciences of the United States of America. 22 (11): 645–648. doi:10.1073/pnas.22.11.645. PMC 1076832. PMID 16577742.
- Jones, D. F. (1934). "Unisexual maize plants and their bearing on sex differentiation in other plants and in animals". Genetics. 19 (6): 552–567. doi:10.1093/genetics/19.6.552. PMC 1208513. PMID 17246737.
- Jones, D. F. (1934). "Unisexual maize plants and their relation to dioecism in other organisms". Proceedings of the National Academy of Sciences of the United States of America. 20 (1): 39–41. doi:10.1073/pnas.20.1.39. PMC 1076336. PMID 16587838.
- Jones, D. F. (1924). "The attainment of homozygosity in inbred strains of maize". Genetics. 9 (5): 405–418. doi:10.1093/genetics/9.5.405. PMC 1200833. PMID 17246048.
- Jones, D. F. (1919). "Selection of pseudo-starchy endosperm in maize". Genetics. 4 (4): 364–393. doi:10.1093/genetics/4.4.364. PMC 1200466. PMID 17245932.
