= Food Fortification Initiative =

Food fortification organization

The Food Fortification Initiative (FFI) is an organization that promotes the fortification of industrially milled flours and cereals. FFI assists country leaders in promoting, planning, implementing, and monitoring the fortification of industrially milled wheat flour, maize flour, and rice. FFI is the only global organization focused exclusively on these three widely consumed grains. FFI operates in approximately thirty countries worldwide and tracks food fortification progress for 196 countries.

== History ==
A Policy Planning Forum held in Mauritius on October 24, 2002, was the first public meeting to organize global efforts to fortify flour. This meeting reflected the existing partnership among Emory University, the United States Centers for Disease Control and Prevention (CDC), Nutrition International, and the International Association of Operative Millers (IAOM). By 2003, this growing global movement, which was focused on fortifying maize flour and wheat flour, was called the Flour Fortification Initiative (FFI). In 2014, FFI was renamed to the Food Fortification Initiative to include the incorporation of rice into FFI's scope of activities.

== Background ==
More than two billion people are estimated to be affected by vitamin and mineral deficiencies, particularly vitamin A, iodine, iron, and zinc. Worldwide, over half of preschool-aged children and two-thirds of non-pregnant women of reproductive age are estimated to have micronutrient deficiencies. Micronutrient deficiencies compromise immune systems, increase vulnerability to infectious diseases, and compromise child growth and development. The micronutrients used in fortification, such as iron and folic acid, prevent birth defects of the brain and spine, as well as anemia caused by nutritional deficiencies. Globally, fortification addresses eight of the United Nations Sustainable Development Goals and can restore nutrients lost in crops due to climate change. The World Health Organization (WHO) recommends large-scale food fortification as a highly effective, evidence-based, and cost-efficient strategy to combat vitamin and mineral deficiencies. Before the establishment of FFI in 2002, there was no global body focused on widespread food fortification, and only 44 countries had legislation to fortify wheat flour.

== Funding ==
FFI receives funding through individual donations, corporations, foundations, and government agencies. Rollins School of Public Health at Emory University contributes office space and administrative support to FFI but not additional funding. Emory University, and therefore FFI, is exempt from federal income tax under section 501(a) as it is an educational institution described in section 501(c)(3) of the Internal Revenue Code. In 2022, FFI received a total of US$1.2 million in donations. Of this amount, 40% came from foundations and individuals, 25.5% came from NGOs/UN agencies, 20% came from corporations, and 14.5% came from government agencies.

== Organization ==
FFI's strategic direction is provided by an Executive Management Team (EMT) representing global leaders in the public, private, and civic sectors. A small FFI Global Secretariat is based at Emory University in Atlanta, Georgia, USA. In addition, individual staff members are based in India and Uganda. The staff of FFI includes research scientists, technical advisors, former industry professionals, and communications specialists.

== Activities ==
FFI provides multiple types of technical support to public, private, and civic stakeholders. This includes identifying champions to advocate for and advance fortification efforts and mapping the regional context through data collection and analysis to develop practical steps for food fortification. FFI monitors global fortification progress across all regions, including Africa, the Americas, Asia-Pacific, Europe, India, and the Middle East and provides governments with data regarding the burden of disease, the methods by which grains would be fortified, the estimated impact of fortification, and the number of people who would benefit from large-scale food fortification. Also, FFI provides information regarding the cost of fortification within a specific country. Part of FFI's strategic plan aims to build or scale up cereal grain fortification programs in geographies with a heavy burden of micronutrient deficiencies and an industrialized milling system. FFI has developed proposals to support fortification efforts in the Pacific Islands, additional Indian states, parts of Africa, Eastern Europe, and other areas.

In 2022, the U.S. Agency for International Development (USAID) announced the launch of the USAID Advancing Food Fortification Opportunities to Reinforce Diets (USAID AFFORD) project. The $75 million global program, a component of the U.S. government's Feed the Future initiative, places businesses at the center of the solution while strategically engaging the public, private, and civil society sectors. The program partners include FFI, TechnoServe, Nutrition International, and ISF advisors.

A nutrition coalition comprising FFI, Global Alliance for Improved Nutrition (GAIN), Iodine Global Network, and Micronutrient Forum developed and supports the Global Fortification Data Exchange, an analysis and visualization tool for tracking global progress on food fortification.

== Locations ==
FFI operates in five major regions—Africa, the Americas, Asia-Pacific, Europe, and India—offering guidance and resources to countries aiming to implement national fortification programs.

=== Africa ===
In 2007, FFI, along with the International Federation for Spina Bifida and Hydrocephalus, the Global Alliance for Improved Nutrition, Nouryon, and Helen Keller International, formed a partnership known as Smarter Futures to improve health through the fortification of wheat and maize flour in Africa with essential vitamins and minerals. The partnership, which ended in 2021, also included Muhlenchemie, Nutrition International, World Food Programme, and Buhler and it was funded by the Ministry of Foreign Affairs of the Netherlands. Additionally, FFI and GAIN have worked with parent and consumer groups in Uganda and Malawi to examine the availability and quality of branded fortified foods on the open market compared to national standards.

=== Americas ===
In the US, wheat flour, maize flour, and rice are all fortified and are part of the national standards, but fortifying corn masa products is voluntary, and less than 6% of corn masa products in the US are fortified. FFI supports advocacy efforts that encourage food producers to fortify corn masa products in the US.

=== Asia-Pacific ===
FFI supports ten countries in the Asia-Pacific. From 2015 to 2021, FFI worked closely with the Solomon Islands Government and private and civic partners to build a strong rice and wheat flour fortification. In 2023, a two-year initiative called Bridging the Fortification Gap in the Philippines (BFGP) was launched to improve the dietary quality and micronutrient status of women, adolescent girls, and children under five years old in the Philippines by updating the existing national standard on wheat flour fortification. This goal is planned to be achieved through a collaboration among the National Nutrition Council of the Philippines, Nutrition International, FFI, and the Iodine Global Network to foster an environment conducive to improving policies on wheat flour fortification and universal salt iodization.

=== Europe ===
In 2019, FFI, UNICEF, USAID, and the Azerbaijan Food Safety Agency held a regional wheat flour fortification capacity-building workshop for countries in Eastern Europe and Central Asia. This training brought together representatives from the milling industry and governmental entities from eight countries to develop expertise in promoting, planning, implementing, and monitoring wheat flour fortification as a strategy to address anemia and neural tube defects.

=== India ===
In India, FFI works on a state-by-state basis instead of at the national level due to the autonomy of state governments and variations in regional consumption patterns. FFI has prioritized several states in India that face a significant burden of micronutrient deficiencies such as Haryana, Maharashtra, and Rajasthan. FFI aims to expand access to fortified foods through the public distribution system (PDS), a government-operated social protection program that reaches millions of people.
