= World Food Council =

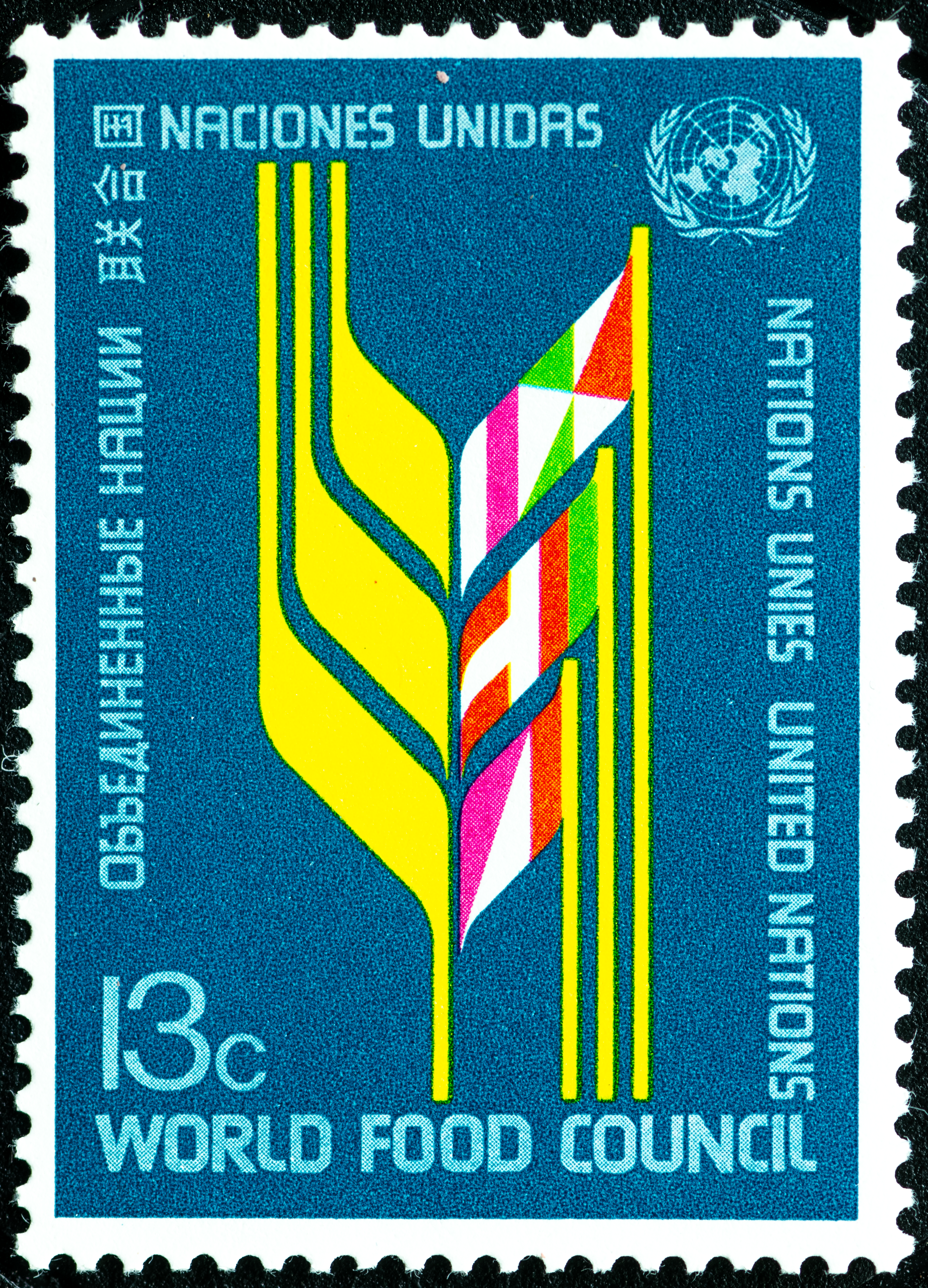
1976 UN-issued postage stamp

World Food Council (WFC) was a United Nations organization established by the UN General Assembly in December 1974 by recommendation of the World Food Conference. Its headquarters was in Rome, Italy. WFC's goal was to serve as a coordinating body for national ministries of agriculture to help reduce malnutrition and hunger. WFC was officially suspended in 1993. WFC is one of very few (if not the only) UN organizations which has been suspended. WFC's functions were absorbed by the Food and Agriculture Organization of the United Nations and the World Food Programme.

== See also ==
- World Food Programme
- Food and Agriculture Organization
- UNICEF
- Global Alliance Against Hunger and Poverty
- Global Alliance for Improved Nutrition
