= ORP =

ORP may refer to:

- Operational Ration Pack, UK military
- Operational Readiness Platform (ORP)
- Orpington railway station, Bromley, England
- O'Reilly Raceway Park at Indianapolis
- Oxidation reduction potential in chemistry
- Okręt Rzeczypospolitej Polskiej, a Polish Navy ship prefix
