= BP-5 Compact Food =

Emergency food ration made with wheat flour

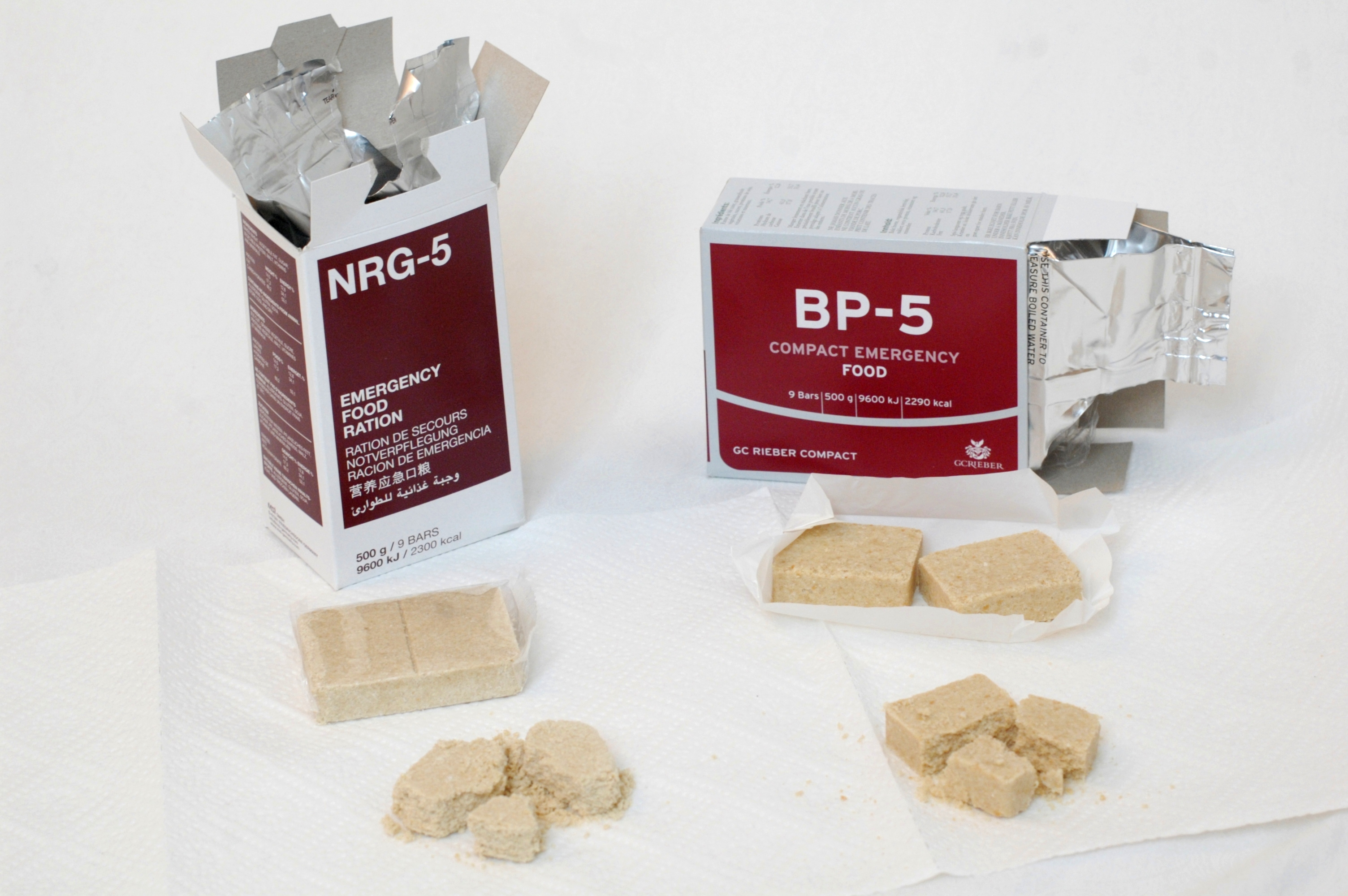
Comparison shot of BP-5 (by Norwegian GC Rieber Compact) and the very similar NRG-5 (by German MSI GmbH)

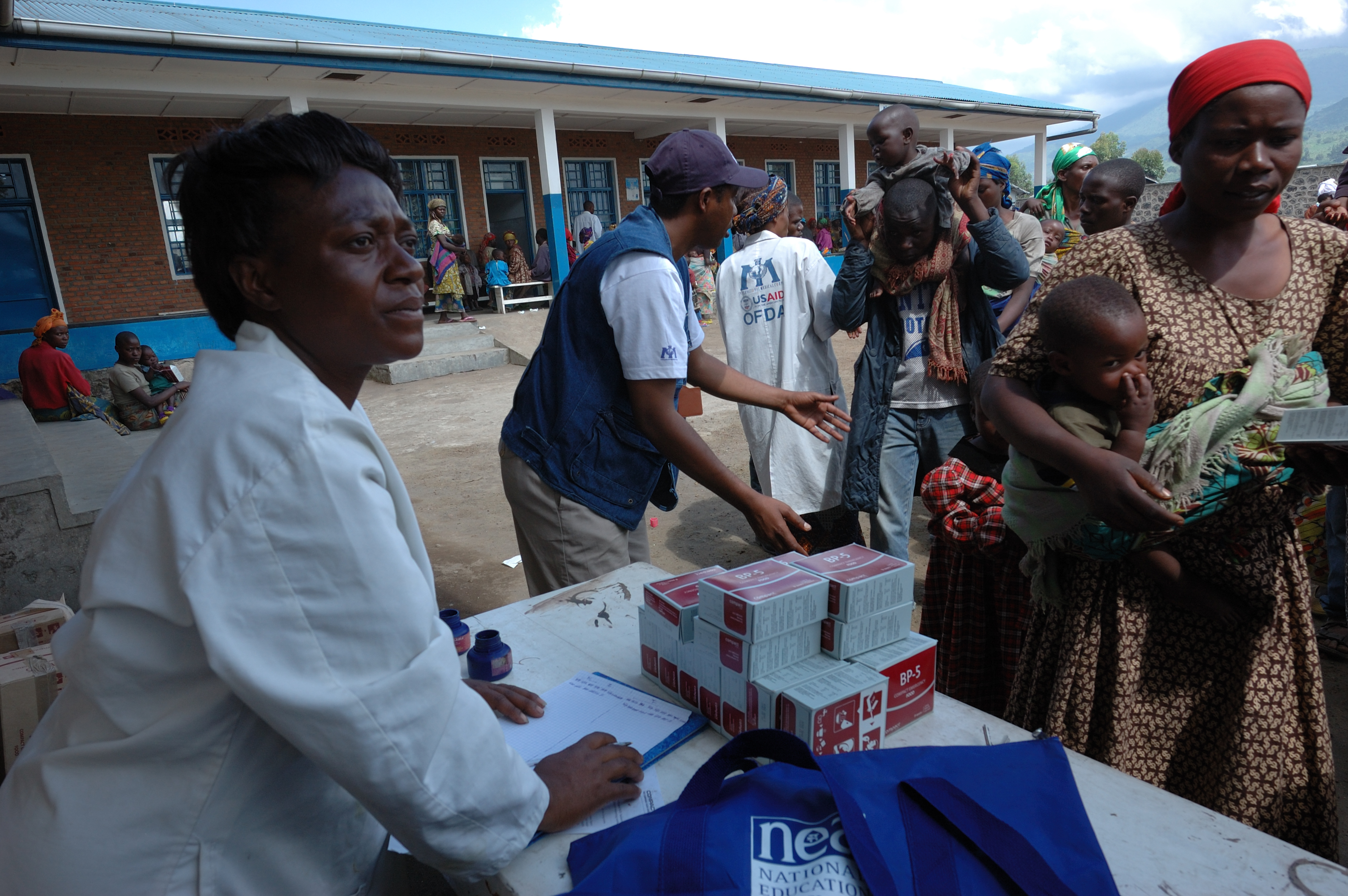
Distribution of BP-5 emergency food packages by UNICEF in Goma, Democratic Republic of the Congo, in November 2008

BP-5 Compact Food (also known as a BP-5 biscuit) is a high-calorie, vitamin fortified, compact, compressed and dry emergency food (food ration bar), often used by relief agencies for the emergency feeding of refugees and internally displaced persons.

== Description ==
BP-5 is available in packs of two biscuit bars. Each box of nine packs contains 500 g of food, with approximately 2,300 calories per box. Its shelf life is five years. The food is produced by Compact AS, based in Norway, and purchased by agencies through UNICEF.

== Ingredients ==
Ingredients include baked wheat flour, partially hydrogenated soybean oil, sugar, soy protein concentrate, malt extract, minerals, amino acids, and vitamins.

== Usage ==
BP-5 is used for disaster relief and disaster preparedness, and for emergency food rations in refugee camps, particularly for malnourished children. It is eaten directly, or mixed with water to make a porridge.

Typically, an adult is given 250 g per day. Although this is a calorie deficit, it provides the recommended protein and basic vitamin requirements. Because it is easily digestible, neutral tasting, and contains no dairy or meat products the food may be widely used, even for people with severe malnourishment.

One study found that its portability made it susceptible to cheating and black-market trade and recommended to switch to "blended foods" as and when practical, blended foods here referring to porridge mixes.

BP-5, along with Plumpy'Nut (a peanut-butter supplement) was fed to visitors to a small mobile refugee camp created by Médecins Sans Frontières (Doctors Without Borders) to travel to major world cities to raise awareness.

== See also ==
- Humanitarian daily ration
- Kanemochi, also called "butter mochi" (バター餅), a similar high caloric density food invented by Japanese matagi hunters
