= Iodine Global Network =

Non-government organization

The Iodine Global Network (abbreviated IGN; formerly the International Council for the Control of Iodine Deficiency Disorders Global Network or ICCIDD Global Network) describes itself as a "non-profit, non-government organization for the sustainable elimination of iodine deficiency worldwide."

== History ==
The Iodine Global Network was founded in 1986, with its inaugural meeting held in Kathmandu, Nepal. In 2002, the Network for Sustained Elimination of Iodine Deficiency was launched at the Special Session for Children. In 2012, the two organizations combined to form IGN.

In December 2014, the organization was renamed to "Iodine Global Network" from "International Council for the Control of Iodine Deficiency Disorders Global Network". The domain name of the IGN's website was changed from iccidd.org to ign.org.

== Partners ==
IGN has partnered with the World Health Organization and UNICEF on work related to iodine deficiency. It has also partnered with the Global Alliance for Improved Nutrition to establish quality management systems for salt iodization. Other partners include the Micronutrient Initiative, Kiwanis International, the U.S. Centers for Disease Control and Prevention, and a number of salt manufacturing companies around the world.

IGN is also affiliated with the International Union of Nutritional Sciences.
