= Lawrence Haddad =

British economist

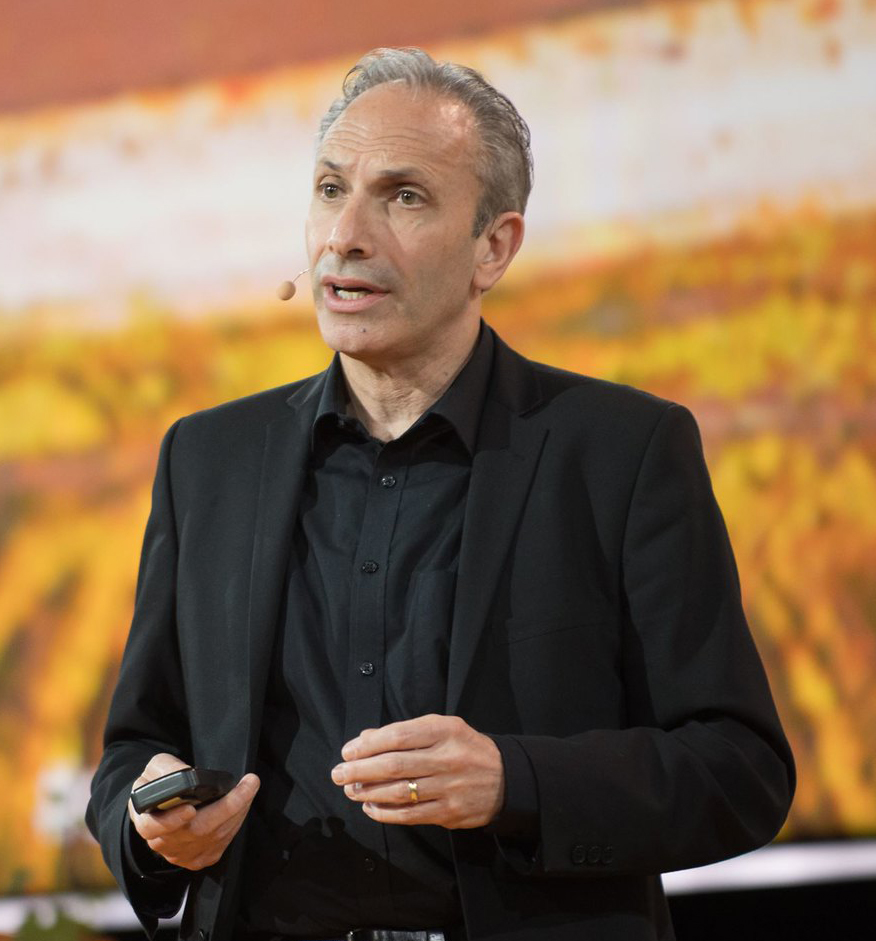
- Born: Lawrence James Haddad; 17 June 1959 (age 67); Johannesburg, South Africa

Academic background
- Education: University of Reading; University of Massachusetts; Stanford University

Academic work
- Discipline: Development economics
- Institutions: Global Alliance for Improved Nutrition (GAIN) International Food Policy Research Institute; University of Sussex
- Website: Information at IDEAS / RePEc

Lawrence James Haddad CMG (born 17 June 1959), is a British economist whose main research focuses on how to make food systems work better to advance the nutrition status of people globally.

He is the Executive Director of the Global Alliance for Improved Nutrition.

== Early life ==
Haddad was born in Johannesburg to Lebanese parents and moved to England in 1961. After his parents split, he was brought up in North East London by his mother and grandmother. It was around this time that Lawrence became a Save the Children volunteer. He received good assistance at school.

In 1980, Haddad graduated from the University of Reading with a degree in Food Science and Economics. At the encouragement of his professors, he went on to complete a Master's in Resource Economics at the University of Massachusetts in 1982. A development economist, Lawrence won subsequently a three-year fellowship to pursue his PhD at Stanford University's Food Research Institute, which he completed in 1988.

== Career ==
From 2009-2010, Haddad was the UK's representative on the Steering Committee of the High Level Panel of Experts (HLPE) of the UN's Committee on World Food Security (CSF). He was the President of the UK and Ireland's Development Studies Association from 2010 to 2012.

From 2004-2014, Haddad served as Director of the Institute of Development Studies (IDS), the world's leading development studies institute. Before joining IDS in 2004, he was Director of the Food Consumption and Nutrition Division at the International Food Policy Research Institute (IFPRI) from 1994 to 2004. Prior to that he was a Lecturer in quantitative development economics at the University of Warwick.

Prior to becoming the Executive Director of GAIN, Lawrence was the founding co-chair and lead author of the Global Nutrition Report (GNR) from 2014 to 2016.

Lawrence became the Executive Director of the Global Alliance for Improved Nutrition (GAIN) in October 2016. GAIN is an international organisation launched at the United Nations in 2002 to tackle the human suffering caused by malnutrition. GAIN seeks to improve the consumption of safe and nutritious food from sustainable food systems for all people, especially the most vulnerable to malnutrition.

On Monday, 25 June 2018, the World Food Prize Foundation awarded the 2018 World Food Prize to Lawrence Haddad, and David Nabarro, former special adviser to the UN Secretary General. Announcing the award Ambassador Quinn, World Food Prize President cited the recipients for their "extraordinary intellectual and policy leadership in bringing maternal and child nutrition to the forefront of the global food security agenda and thereby significantly reducing childhood stunting"

Most recently he was appointed by the UN Deputy Secretary General to lead nutrition work at the 2021 UN Food system Summit.

Haddad was appointed Companion of the Order of St Michael and St George (CMG) in the 2023 New Year Honours for services to international nutrition, food and agriculture.

== Media ==
Lawrence is regularly featured in news media, social media and blogs such as Al Jazeera, Forbes and The Guardian.

== Selected bibliography ==
=== Journal articles ===
- Fanzo, Jessica; Haddad, Lawrence; Schneider, Kate R.; Béné, Christophe; Covic, Namukolo M.; Guarin, Alejandro (September 2021). "Rigorous monitoring is necessary to guide food system transformation in the countdown to the 2030 global goals". Food Policy. 104 102163. doi:10.1016/j.foodpol.2021.102163. hdl:10568/115262. S2CID 244241413.
- Haddad, Lawrence (2020). "Viewpoint: A view on the key research issues that the CGIAR should lead on 2020–2030". Food Policy. 91 (C) 101824. doi:10.1016/j.foodpol.2020.101824. S2CID 213075948.
- Headey, Derek; Heidkamp, Rebecca; Haddad, Lawrence (August 2020). "Impacts of COVID-19 on childhood malnutrition and nutrition-related mortality". The Lancet. 396 (10250): 519–521. doi:10.1016/S0140-6736(20)31647-0. PMC 7384798. PMID 32730743.
- Fanzo, Jessica; Haddad, Lawrence; McLaren, Rebecca (13 May 2020). "The Food Systems Dashboard is a new tool to inform better food policy" (PDF). Nature Food. 1 (5): 243–246. doi:10.1038/s43016-020-0077-y. S2CID 219470825.
- Haddad, Lawrence (2019). "How can businesses operating in the food system accelerate improvement in nutrition?". In S. Fan; S. Yosef; R. Pandya-Lorch (eds.). Agriculture for Improved Nutrition: Seizing the Momentum. CABI International.
- Haddad, Lawrence (April 2018). "Reward food companies for improving nutrition" (PDF). Nature. 556 (7699): 19–22. Bibcode:2018Natur.556...19H. doi:10.1038/d41586-018-03918-7. PMID 29620753. S2CID 4602666.

== See also ==
- Feminist economics
- List of feminist economists
