= Emergency rations =

Stored food and drink for emergency use

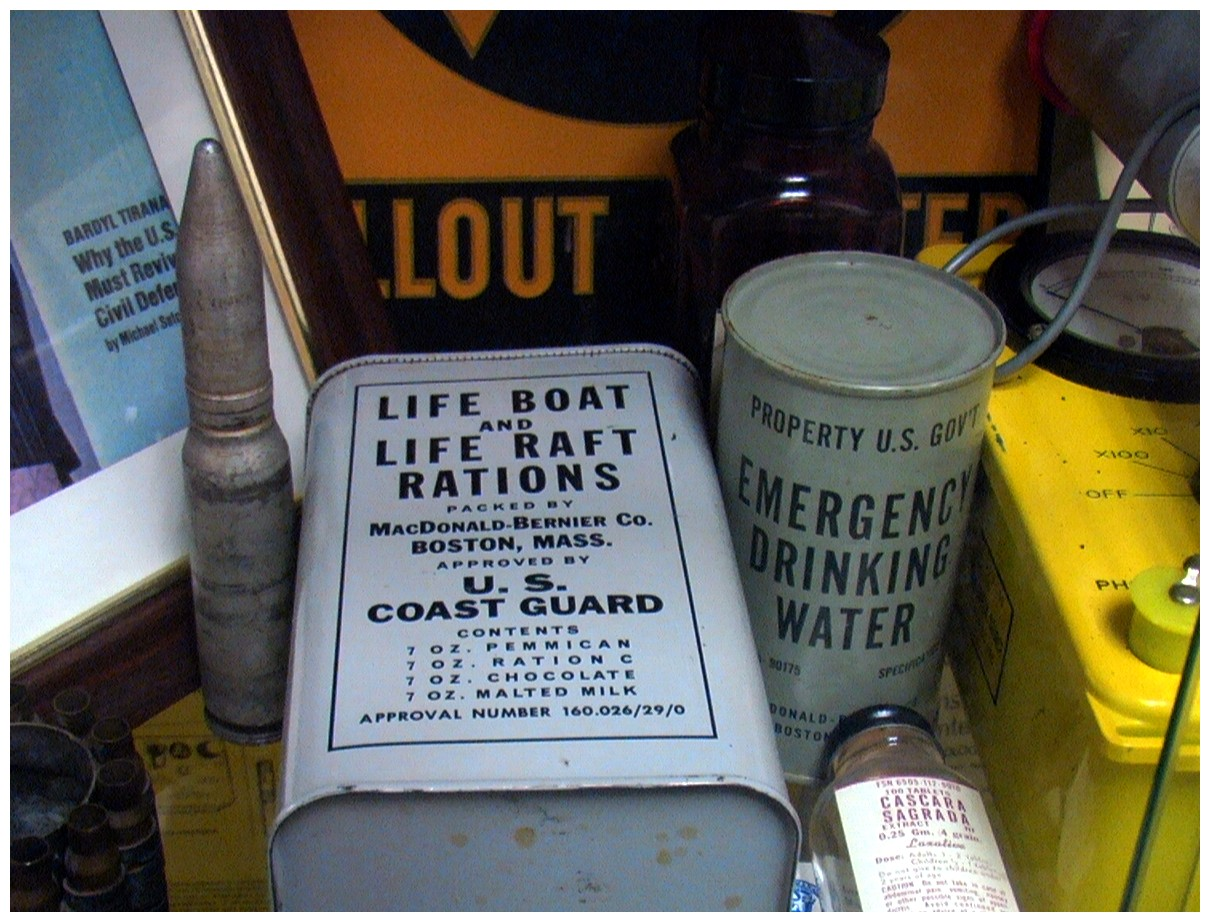
Old emergency rations featured in a display case at the Federal Emergency Management Agency (FEMA) Region V office, Chicago, Illinois (November 2006).

Emergency rations are items of food and drink that a person stores and relies on in case of an emergency. Emergency food supplies can be purchased for camping trips or wilderness adventures. These supplies are meant to last for several days. Many people also purchase long shelf life emergency food in case of natural disasters or other emergency situations. The food can come in the form of a powder, freeze dried, smoked or salted. The rations are to help people survive until help arrives and are often carried while hill walking or mountaineering, because of the risk of being stranded by an accident. In some organised events, such as Ten Tors, it is obligatory to carry emergency rations.

Emergency rations are often carried by camping enthusiasts, especially back-pack campers, who are more likely to be far from food supplies. Emergency foodstuffs are usually high in caloric content, and sometimes also in nutritional content. Typical emergency foodstuffs are high-calorie foods such as candy bars, nutritional or protein bars, sports or energy bars, hard bread or biscuit (including food ration bars), dried meat (such as jerky or pemmican), and dried fruit. If water is available, rations with little water content are lighter to carry.

Emergency rations are generally carried on the person by people on foot in case of becoming lost or separated from normal food supplies. Water or other drinks are carried if water is not readily available from the environment.

The makeup of emergency rations can be adjusted to suit different situations depending on which properties are the most desirable under the specific circumstances. For instance, when comparing trekking to being lost at sea, a high caloric density is more of a priority in the former case and in the latter case the metabolic effects of the macronutrient composition require greater consideration.

Emergency rations are used in humanitarian aid. In these contexts, the purpose of the rations is twofold: preventing malnutrition and sustaining physical activity. The energy content required for this depends on several factors, including the level of physical activity and environmental temperature.

== See also ==
- BP-5 Compact Food
- Humanitarian daily ration
- Field ration
- Military rations
- Ninja diet
