= Mario Herrero =

Researcher

- Born: 2 March 1967 (age 59); Costa Rica
- Education: The University of Edinburgh
- Known for: Research on the sustainability of food systems
- Scientific career
- Fields: Agricultural science, Agroecology, Sustainable development
- Workplaces: Cornell University; CSIRO; ILRI
- Website: https://cals.cornell.edu/people/mario-herrero#about

Mario Herrero (born 2 March 1967) is a professor of sustainable food systems and global change in the Cornell CALS Department of Global Development. He is also the director of Food Systems & Global Change, a Cornell Atkinson Scholar, and a Nancy and Peter Meinig Family Investigator in the Life Sciences. With a focus on increasing the sustainability of food systems, Herrero has made significant contributions to the field, benefiting both people and the planet.

== Career ==
Prior to joining Cornell University, Herrero served as the Chief Scientist of Sustainability at Australia's National Science Agency, the Commonwealth Scientific and Industrial Research Organisation (CSIRO). He also accumulated 13 years of experience at the International Livestock Research Institute, where he held various leadership roles.

He is a Co-Chair of the Global Food Systems Countdown initiative, Coordinating Lead Author of the IPBES Nexus Assessment, EAT-Lancet Commissioner, he is in the steering group of the global True Cost of Food Coalition, and on the executive committee of the Global Burden of Animal Diseases programme. He was a member of the Scientific Group leading Action Track 2 - Shifts to Sustainable Food Consumption of the UN Food Systems Summit. He has held senior positions and was lead author of the IPCC Special Report on climate change, food security and land, the IPCC 5th and 6th Assessment Reports (lead and contributor author) in the area of agricultural greenhouse gas mitigation, a commissioner in the EAT-Lancet Commission on Sustainable Diets, The Lancet Commission on Obesity, and a member of the US National Academy of Sciences high level panel on the Future of Agriculture and Food.

Herrero has published more than 350 peer reviewed publications. He is a Highly Cited Researcher according to the Web of Science and is in the top 10 of the Reuters Hot list of the world's 1000 most influential climate change researchers. He is an editor of Global Food Security, a guest editor for the Proceedings of the National Academy of Science (PNAS) since 2013, and is the editorial boards of The Lancet Planetary Health, Frontiers in Sustainable Food Systems, and Tropical Grasslands. In 2019, he was awarded a Fellowship to the Royal Society of Edinburgh for his contributions to the sustainability of food systems. He is an editor of the Global Food Security journal and is also on numerous editorial boards.

== Education ==
- PhD in Ecology and Natural Resource Management, The University of Edinburgh, Edinburgh, Scotland - 1998
- MSc. Tropical Animal Production and Health, The University of Edinburgh, Edinburgh, Scotland - 1992
- BSc. Tropical Animal Production, Central American School of Animal Husbandry, Atenas, Costa Rica - 1988
