= High energy biscuit =

Wheat biscuits containing high-protein cereals and vegetable fat

High energy biscuits
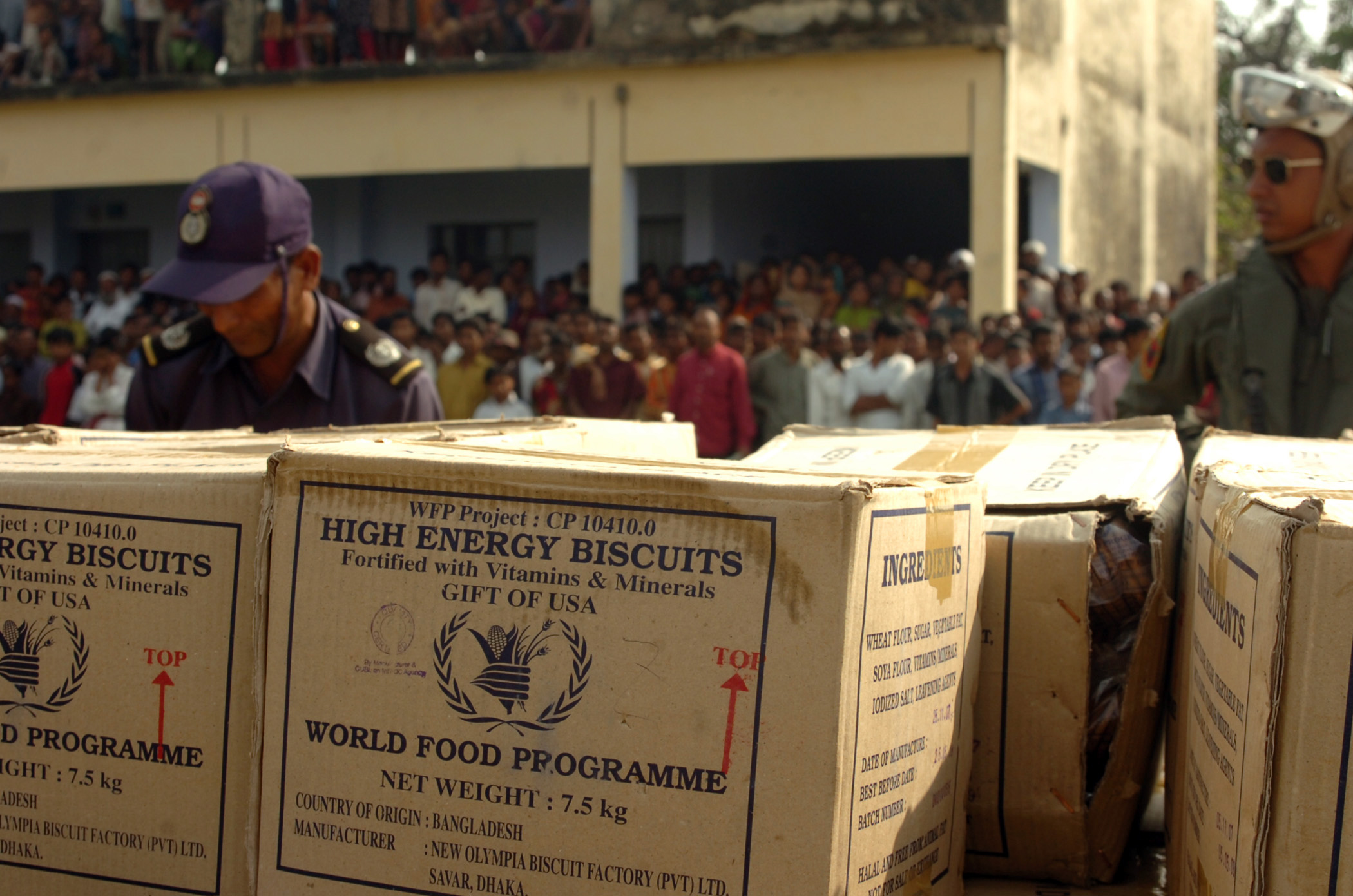
- High energy biscuits delivered to Bangladesh after Cyclone Sidr
- Type: Biscuit
- Main ingredients: Cereals and vegetable fat

High energy biscuits (HEB) are food ration bars containing high-protein cereals and vegetable fat. Because of their high energy-to-mass ratio they are procured by the World Food Programme, the food aid branch of the United Nations, for feeding disaster victims worldwide.

HEBs have been provided to a variety of geographical locations. For example, HEBs were delivered to Georgia after the 2008 South Ossetia war. HEBs were also airlifted to Kenya, marked as an alternative food assistance ration in Ukraine, and more recently distributed in aid in the 2010 Haiti earthquake, and 80 tonnes of high energy biscuits were delivered to the Tunisian border in response to the Libyan crisis.

HEBs are usually packaged in cardboard boxes weighing 10 kg each.

== Technical specifications ==
- Moisture content: 4.5% maximum
- Nutritional value per 100g dry matter:
- Energy: 450 kcal minimum
- Protein: 10.0-15.0g (N x 6.25)
- Fat: 15.0g minimum
- Sugar (total): 10.0-15.0g
- Fiber (crude): 2.3g maximum
- Ash (total): 3.5g maximum
