= International Association of Operative Millers =

International Association of Operative Millers (IAOM) is an international organization founded in 1896 which promotes the advancement of education and training opportunities in the grain milling industries. The group was formerly known as the Association of Operative Millers. IAOM is based in Overland Park, Kansas, United States.

The association and its member districts regularly hold meetings.
