= Global Alliance for Improved Nutrition =

Swiss nonprofit foundation

GAIN - Global Alliance for Improved Nutrition
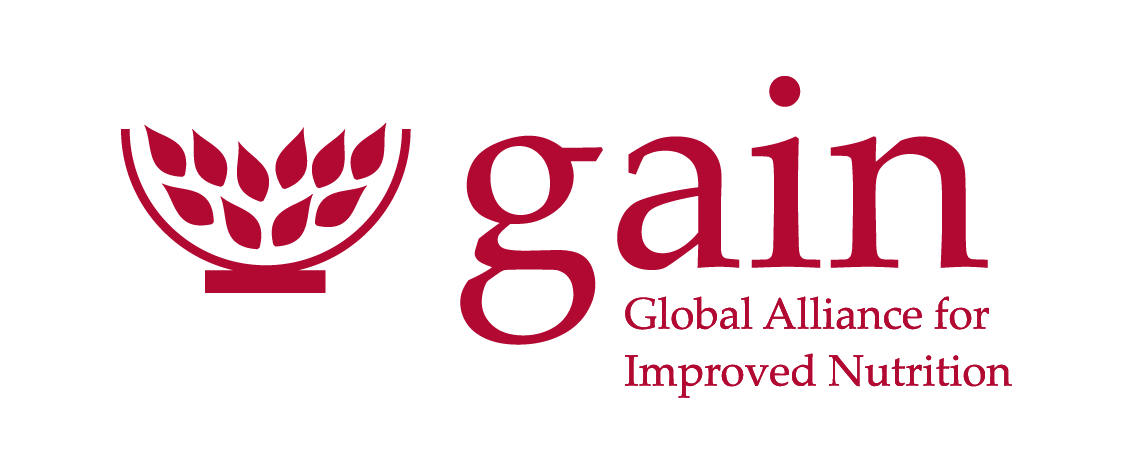
- Founded: 2002
- Type: Independent non-profit foundation
- Location: Geneva, Switzerland
- Key people: Lawrence Haddad Executive Director Catherine Bertini Chair of the GAIN Board of Directors
- Employees: 100+
- Website: www.gainhealth.org

The Global Alliance for Improved Nutrition (GAIN) is a non-profit foundation based in Geneva, Switzerland. GAIN was developed during the UN 2002 Special Session of the General Assembly on Children. GAIN's activities include improving the consumption of nutritious and safe foods for all. The foundation is supported by over 30 donors and works closely with international organisations and United Nations agencies. It has a 20-year history of food system programmes with a focus on adolescent and child nutrition, food system research, fortification, small and medium enterprise assistance, biofortification of crops, and reducing post-harvest losses.

GAIN has headquarters in Geneva, Switzerland, along with offices in countries with high levels of malnutrition: Bangladesh, Ethiopia, India, Indonesia, Kenya, Mozambique, Nigeria, Pakistan, and Tanzania. It also has representative offices in Denmark, the Netherlands, the United Kingdom, and the United States.

== Work and Programmes ==
GAIN works with partners – governments, UN agencies, non-governmental organizations, and businesses worldwide. As of 2022, GAIN reached an estimated 1.2 billion people to gain access to fortified food.

GAIN's collective impact approach in the nutrition sector has been recognised by the Stanford Social Innovation Review as a model of collaboration that achieves large scale progress in the face of the urgent and complex problems of our time. The Harvard Business Review has also recognized GAIN's innovation in pushing businesses to develop nutritious food products for the base of the wealth pyramid.

=== Fortification ===
Fortification is GAIN's oldest programme area, starting in 2003 when China, Morocco, South Africa and Vietnam became the first four countries to be supported. They have also developed the adoption of nutrient dense varieties of crops (“biofortified crops”) developed through natural plant breeding. Since 2002, GAIN has supported the roll-out fortification in approximately 30 low and middle-income countries as an approach to help decrease malnutrition. As a result, 14 countries mandated Large Scale Food Fortification. The GAIN Premix Facility project assists countries in procure high-quality, low-cost mineral and vitamin premix. The GAIN Premix Facility sourced US$79 million worth of fortificants and premix blends since 2009, across 53 countries. In 2019, GAIN entered a partnership with HarvestPlus and launched the commercialization of biofortified crops programme with the objective of significantly expanding the reach of foods and food products made from biofortified staple foods in six countries; India, Pakistan, Bangladesh, Nigeria, Kenya and Tanzania.

=== Nutrition Enterprise Unit ===
GAIN's Nutrition Enterprise Unit aims to support and represent over 1000 small and medium enterprises globally across the food system. The Nutrition Enterprise Development programme provides technical assistance to develop the capacities and technical assistance of SMEs working in food value chains. The Nutritious Food Financing Programme (N3F) provides debt investments to food value chain SMEs via a direct investment fund and providing technical support to SMEs across Sub-Saharan Africa. The SUN Business Network (SBN) was established between GAIN and the World Food Programme to support governments in mobilising the private sector to invest in improved business practices that contribute to national nutrition priorities. The SUN Business Network currently convenes over 1,400 business members globally.

=== Drivers of Food Systems Change ===
This cluster was specifically established to develop and implement responses to social and contextual changes, including gender, environmental issues and reaching the poorest in society, technology, social norms throughout the food system. Programmes under this area include Demand Generation, designed to generate greater consumer demand for healthy diets. sustainably and at scale. Social Protection aims to identify ways to make social protection programmes more nutrition-sensitive to the most vulnerable in society. The organisation also launched a number of responses to food systems resilance, partnering with Standing Together for Nutrition to develop the Keeping Food Markets Working initiative as a direct response to the COVID-19 pandemic. They also developed the Workforce Nutrition initiative, focusing on partnerships with employers that can be integrated in their day-to-day operations and supply chains to improve employees' and their dependents' diets.

== Building a global nutrition movement ==
=== Engaging the global community ===
A critical component of GAIN's efforts has been positioning nutrition as central to the global health and development platform. GAIN supports enhanced advocacy efforts at the national, regional and international levels, to enhance the policy environment to reach scale, raise the profile of nutrition and ultimately increase human and financial resources to address malnutrition.

In 2011, as part of its expanded advocacy program, GAIN launched Future Fortified, a global campaign to improve the nutrition of mothers and children through support for GAIN programs and related global nutrition advocacy efforts.

GAIN also supporters Scaling Up Nutrition, together with the World Food Programme, is a co-convener of the SUN Business Network. GAIN joined with partners to establish the 1,000 Days Partnership and supports the implementation of its programs.

=== Partnerships and Summits ===
United Nations Food Systems Summit (UN FSS)

During the United Nations Food Systems Summit (UN FSS) in 2021, Lawrence Haddad, executive director of the Global Alliance for Improved Nutrition, was nominated to chair Action Track 1: Ensure Access to Safe and Nutritious Food for All. These Track focused on the areas of promoting Food Security and reducing hunger. The Action Track engaged with the wider public in many ways, one of them being the Public Forums organised in November 2020, February 2021 and May 2021.

Nutrition for Growth (N4G) 2021

On 7 and 8 December 2021, one year later than originally planned due to the global COVID-19 pandemic, the Nutrition for Growth (N4G) Summit 2021 was held. The Summit resulted in 396 commitments made by government departments and ministries, international organisations, donor organisations, private sector businesses, civil society organisations and academic/research institutions. In the run-up to the Summit, GAIN, together with the Access to Nutrition Initiative had been supporting the Business Constituency Group (BCG). The BCG originated from the Building Business Contributions for the 2020 Global Nutrition Summit conference that took place in The Hague on 25–26 June 2019. GAIN responded to a request from the UK Department for International Development (DFID) and the UN Food and Agriculture Organization (FAO) to lead consultations on building business contributions as part of this work. GAIN published its commitments for N4G and registered a commitment on large-scale food fortification and diet quality for consumers at the bottom of the pyramid in the Nutrition Accountability Framework.

Standing Together For Nutrition (ST4N)

Standing Together for Nutrition was a multi-disciplinary consortium that brought together experts across the areas of nutrition, economics, food and health system experts to assess the impact of COVID-19 on nutritional status. The consortium projected impacts during the short- and long-term recovery phases of the pandemic and identified ways to mitigate the nutritional damage done, with a specific focus on children. The consortium was co-convened by Lawrence Haddad, executive director at GAIN, and Saskia Osendarp, executive director at the Micronutrient Forum (MNF).

=== Building public and private partnerships ===
GAIN engages with the private sector to improve efficiency and effectiveness of markets.

The SUN Business Network (SBN) co-convened by GAIN and the UN World Food Programme – is one of the four global networks that support SUN countries – along with UN, Civil Society and Donor Networks. The SBN was established to bring business together behind the SUN Movement and its aim to ensure that all people realise their right to good food and nutrition. In 2015, the SBN surpassed its target of 99 companies, with 160 now making public commitments to improving nutrition, and tracking their progress annually. These commitments range from increasing reach in broadcasting mobile phone nutrition messages, all the way to providing 60 million people each year with fortified staple foods. In total, commitments from member companies amount to reaching 125 million consumers every year by 2020. The SBN is now supporting ten SUN countries to develop national platforms and strategies to engage business in country-led national nutrition strategies.

The Amsterdam Initiative against Malnutrition (AIM) is a coalition of the Dutch Ministry of Foreign Affairs, Unilever, DSM, AkzoNobel, Wageningen University, ICCO and GAIN that aims to work with others to end malnutrition in Africa by 2015 through initially targeting six countries: Kenya, Tanzania, South Africa, Ethiopia, Ghana and Mozambique. In Kenya, AIM has initiated a milk fortification project and a market study to get insight into consumer attitudes towards fortified milk. AIM partners have also identified distribution channels for nutritious foods that reach base of the pyramid populations, including safe water kiosks, milk bars, and school feeding programs. The initiative also began supporting the Kenya Nutritionists and Dieticians Institute, to create demand for nutrition through strengthening capacity development, policy and advocacy, and public engagement. AIM will increase focus on market insight and BOP consumer aspirations to ensure nutritious products are not only accessible and affordable, but also in high demand.

The GAIN Nordic Partnership is a multi-sector platform with an ambition to facilitate scalable and inclusive business models that enhance the nutritional value of food in developing countries. It was established in 2014 by the five founding partners: Arla Foods Ingredients, Tetra Pak, DanChurchAid, the Confederation of Danish Industry and GAIN. The platform brings together Nordic companies, civil society, academia and the public sector in a forum for collaboration, action and knowledge sharing. The first focus area of the GAIN Nordic Partnership is the development of sustainable initiatives along the dairy value chain in Ethiopia and East Africa. The goal is to reach low-income consumers with an income of US$2 to US$5 a day.

The Access to Nutrition Index, hosted by the Access to Nutrition initiative (ATNi) which started in 2013, tracks how well the food and beverage industry provides nutritious products to consumers. The original methodology was developed by GAIN, and is jointly funded the Bill & Melinda Gates Foundation, and the Wellcome Trust. The index aims to increase consumers' access to more nutritious products and ultimately contribute to addressing the serious global problems of both undernutrition and obesity. It will allow food and beverage companies to benchmark their performance on nutrition against their peers, and it will serve as a platform that provides stakeholders – from investors to consumers and policymakers – with information that they can use to inform their decisions and their programs. The index also seeks to promote nutrition as an investible theme within the investment community.

== Operations ==
=== Funding and expenses ===
GAIN receives funding from a number of organizations including multi-year grants from: the Bill & Melinda Gates Foundation (BMGF), Botnar Foundation, The Children's Investment Fund Foundation (CIFF), Canada (DFATD), Ministry of Foreign Affairs of Denmark, Germany (BMZ/GIZ), Irish Aid, Ministry of Foreign Affairs of the Government of the Netherlands, Rockefeller Foundation, Swiss Development Cooperation, the UK Foreign Commonwealth and Development Office (to 2021), the United Nations Children's Fund (UNICEF), the United States Agency for International Development (USAID) and the United Nations World Food Programme (WFP), as well as a range of other partners.

GAIN's total income during 2020–2021 was US$57,432,161.

Previous years' income: 2019-2020: USD$45,175,851 and 2018-2019: USD$44,715,308.

=== Board members ===
GAIN's board of directors is the highest decision-making body in GAIN, which provides overall strategy and direction. Board members consist of unaffiliated individuals drawn from leading development, business and scientific organisations. Board members receive no remuneration. They oversee all aspects of GAIN's decision-making processes. Catherine Bertini is the current Chair of the GAIN Board of Directors.

Other Board members include:

- Felia Salim, chair of the GAIN Board
- Ajai Puri, Non-Executive Director at Tate and Lyle PLC, Firmenich SA and Britannia Industries Limited
- Dominic O'Neill, executive director of The Water Supply and Sanitation Collaborative Council
- Kathryn Dewey, Professor at Department of Nutrition, University of California
- Tom Arnold, Ireland's Special Envoy on Food Systems
- Sheryl Fofaria, Head of The Philanthropy Centre for Europe, the Middle East and Africa, J.P. Morgan
- Cherrie Atilano, Founding Farmer, CEO and President of AGREA Agricultural Systems International
- Ndidi Nwuneli, Managing Partner, Sahel Consulting Agriculture & Nutrition Ltd
- Andris Piebalgs, Professor at European University Institute, Former EU Development Commissioner
- Julie Wynne, Partner, MLL
- Kaosar Afsana, Professor of Public Health, BRAC James P Grant School of Public Health
- Mario Herrero, Professor at Cornell, Department of Global Development
- Mauricio Adade, President Latin America and Global Malnutrition Partnerships, DSM

Ex officio:

- Lawrence Haddad, executive director, Global Alliance for Improved Nutrition, Geneva, Switzerland

=== Partnership Council ===
GAIN'S Partnership Council acts as an advisory body to the Board and Strategic Management Team. They provide guidance and recommendations on GAIN's strategic and investment priorities. The Partnership Council draws representatives from organisations that are partners of GAIN.

== See also ==
- World Food Programme
- Food and Agriculture Organization
- UNICEF
- Global Alliance Against Hunger and Poverty
- Lawrence Haddad
