= Food ration bar =

Compact, shelf-stable, grain-based dry food item

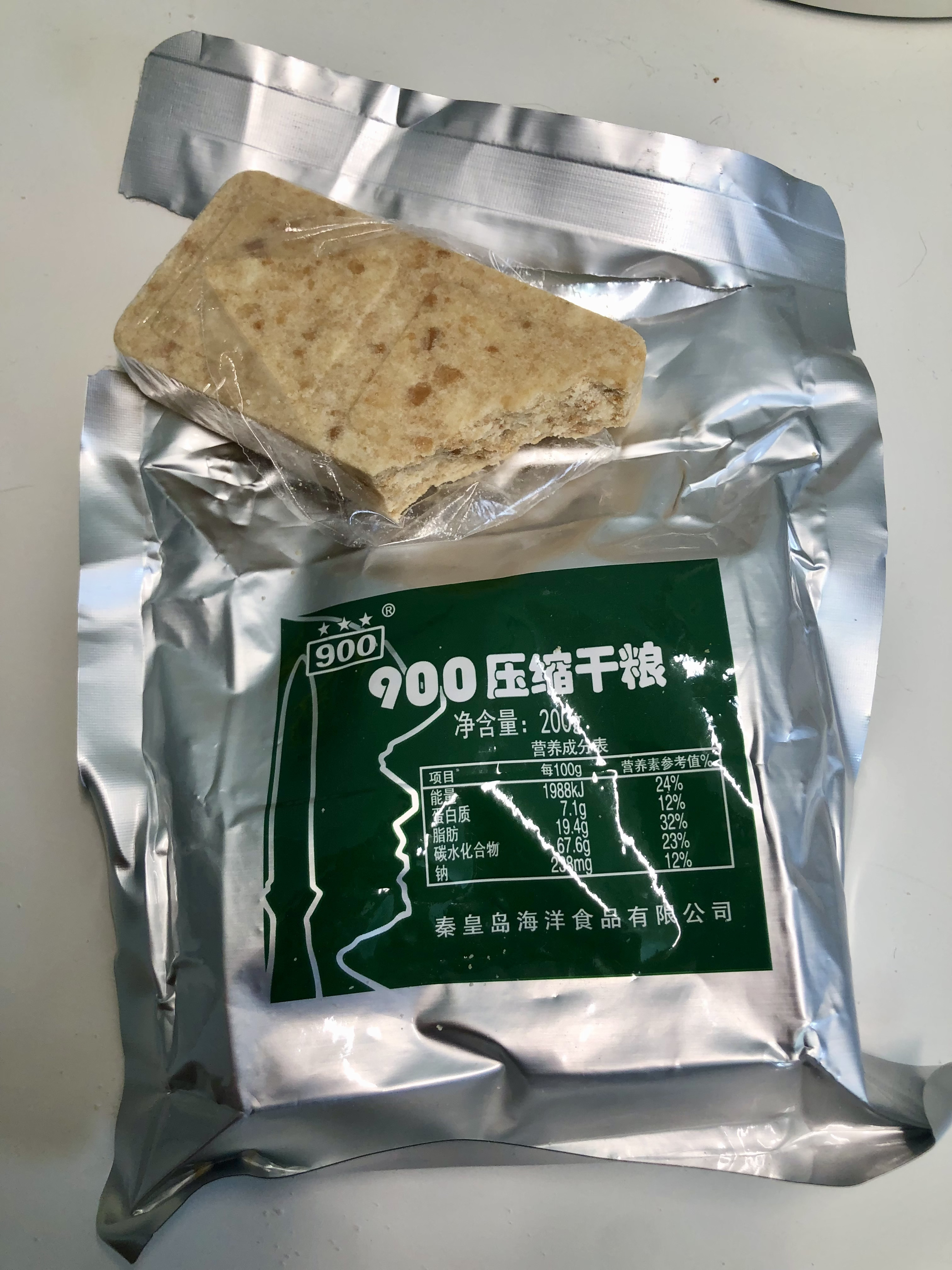
Chinese civilian market "type 900" compressed food, derived from the military "type 90".

A food ration bar (also known as emergency food bar or compressed food bar) is a type of bar generally included in emergency rations and compact field rations. A cross between a hardtack and an energy bar, these shelf-stable products provide a high caloric density and are generally made of grain flour, sugar, and vegetable oil.

Food ration bars may be consumed directly or broken up and mixed with water for a porridge. The composition depends on usage: humanitarian versions place a focus on protein content and nutrition fortification, while naval products place the emphasis on it being non-thirst-provoking.

Some example ration bars are:

- A-28 (rice) and A-29 (wheat), two USDA humanitarian standard products
- BP-5 Compact Food, fortified humanitarian
- Datrex, for lifeboat use
- No. 701/702, No. 761/762, Type 90, Type 09 and Type 13 Chinese military ration

Food bar standards are issued by maritime agencies such as the U.S. Coast Guard and humanitarian agencies such as the World Food Programme, each for their respective use cases.

Food ration bars under the name of 压缩干粮 "compact dry food" are a core part of the military food of the Chinese People's Liberation Army for field and emergency use.

The experimental Close Combat Assault Ration for the US Army features several food bars, produced using vacuum microwave drying and a new "sonic agglomeration" technology (a combination of ultrasonic welding and molding) that removes the need of binding agents.

== See also ==
- High energy biscuit, a World Food Programme standard product for humanitarian use; functionally similar but are proper biscuits in form
- Ninja diet
- Butter mochi (Akita style), a high caloric density food used by Japanese Matagi hunters
