= Kathryn Dewey =

American nutritionist

- Born: March 9, 1952 (age 74); New York, New York, US

Academic background
- Education: Ph.D., Biological Sciences, 1980, University of Michigan

Kathryn Gertrude Dewey (born March 9, 1952) is an American nutritionist. She is a Distinguished Professor Emerita in the Department of Nutrition at the University of California, Davis. Her studies in nutrition led to adaptations to the World Health Organization's recommendations for infants.

== Early life and education ==
Dewey was born on March 9, 1952, in New York, New York. She earned her PhD in Biological Sciences from the University of Michigan.

== Career ==
Upon receiving her PhD, Dewey joined the faculty at the University of California, Davis in 1980. As a professor of nutrition, she led two studies in Honduras which concluded that infants should receive only breast milk for their first six months of life. Her research team also found that the growth rate of breast-fed babies differs significantly from that of formula-fed babies, thus prompting a change to the World Health Organization's (WHO) recommendations for infants. In 1999, Dewey co-authored a book titled Complementary Feeding of Young Children in Developing Countries which was aimed at WHO and UNICEF to "stimulate and guide creation of national programs to improve child-feeding practices in low-income countries." In the same year, Dewey was also the lead researcher on a study which found that diet and aerobic exercise could help breast feeding mothers lose weight after pregnancy. As a result of her research, Dewey was appointed director of a WHO-led research project to revise growth charts for children under the age of 5 years. The results of the project were released by WHO in 2006. Following this, Dewey led another research project focusing on delayed umbilical cord clamping which also contributed to WHO policy.

In 2010, Dewey led a research team in Bangladesh and Guatemala to test whether Nutributter could prevent stunting and abnormal motor development in malnutritioned children. As a result of her research, Dewey was recipient of UC Davis' Award of Distinction and McCollum International Lectureship in Nutrition Award. In 2017, Dewey was appointed to sit on the Food and Nutrition Board of the National Academies of Sciences, Engineering, and Medicine for a three-year term. The following year, she was elected a Fellow of the American Society for Nutrition and named to sit on the 2020 Dietary Guidelines Advisory Committee.
