= Field ration =

Food given to soldiers in the field or on deployment

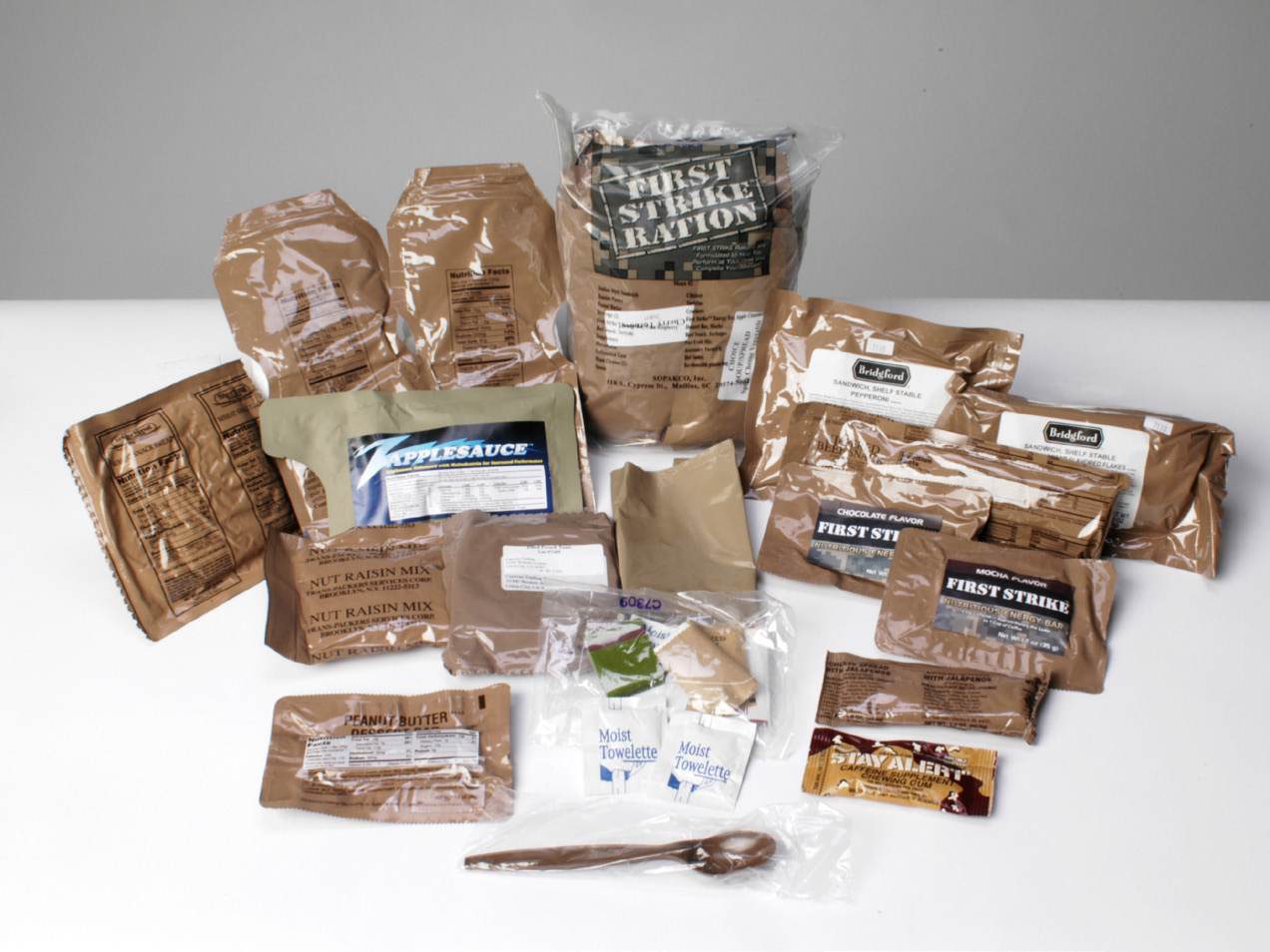
The contents of a First Strike Ration, a United States Army field ration for high-energy meals in combat

A field ration is a type of prepackaged military ration designed to be easily and quickly prepared and consumed in the field, in combat, at the front line, or where eating facilities are otherwise unavailable. Field rations are primarily used by military forces, though they are also sometimes distributed to civilians as part of humanitarian aid and emergency management.

Field rations differ from garrison rations and field kitchen provisions, which are intended for where proper meals can be supplied and prepared with relative ease and safety, such as in the rear where logistics are steady and fresh food can be supplied. They are similar to, but distinct from, other purpose-designed long-lasting types of food or rations such as emergency rations, humanitarian daily rations, and camping food.

Names used for field rations vary by military and type, and include combat ration, ration pack, battle ration, iron ration, food packet, operational ration pack, or meal ready-to-eat (MRE); the latter is widely used but informal, and more accurately describes a specific U.S. field ration, the design and configuration of which has been used worldwide since its introduction in the late 20th century. Field rations may be divided into two types: individual rations, which are intended to sustain a single soldier; and group rations, which are intended to sustain multiple soldiers in numbers ranging from a fireteam to a platoon. Furthermore, field rations may come individually packaged per meal, or contain items intended to be consumed in multiple meals throughout the day.

== Contents ==
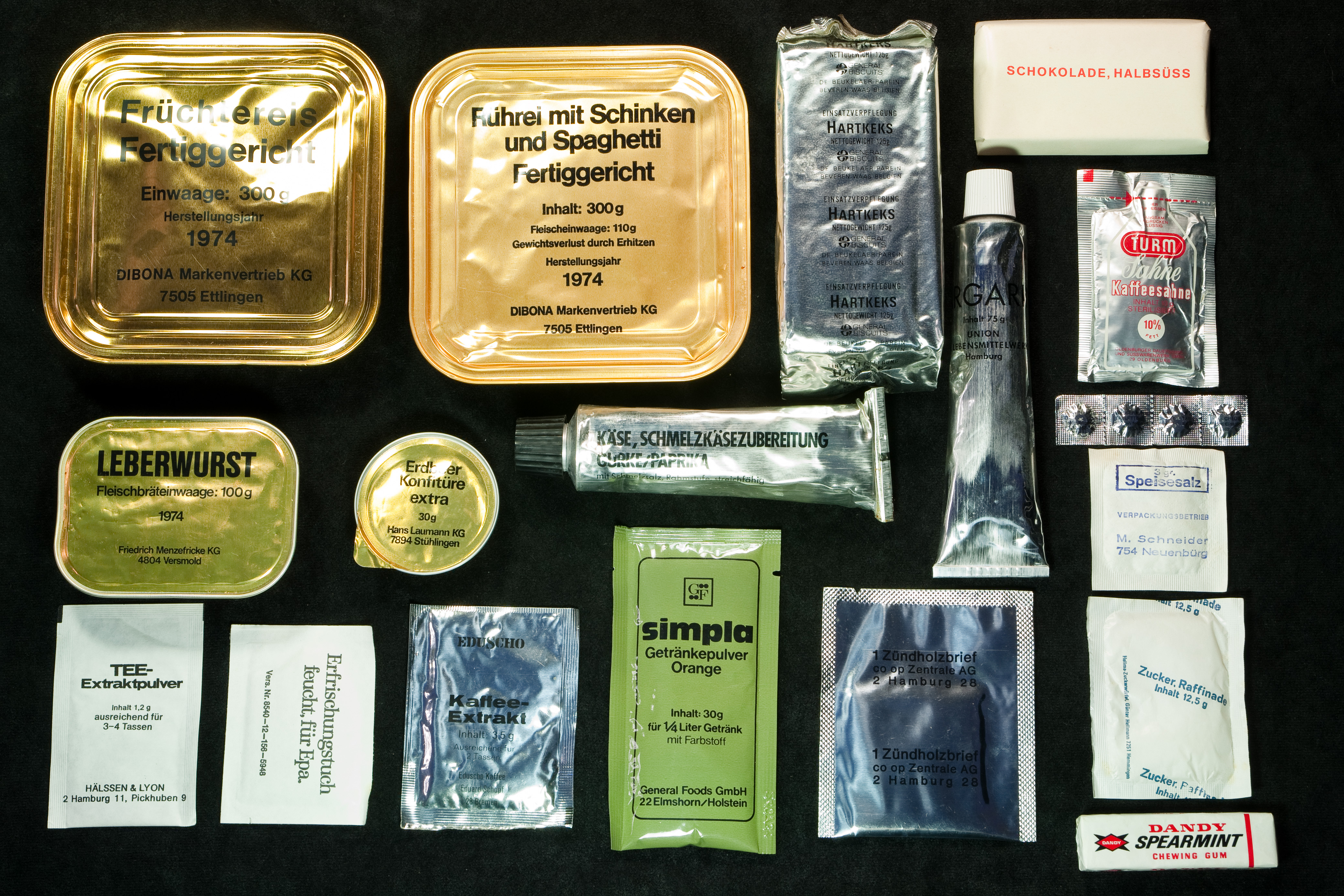
The contents of a Bundeswehr field ration from 1974

A typical field ration consists of:

- An entrée or main course, typically full meals consisting of preserved and nonperishable precooked meat, vegetables, legumes, grains, rice, or staple foods; dehydrated soup or broth may also be offered, often in the form of bouillon cubes
- Side dishes or appetizers such as crackers or biscuits, spreads (commonly cheese spread, peanut butter, jam or jelly, chocolate spread, or pâté), pickles, or preservable salad (usually potato salad, tuna salad, or fruit salad)
- Desserts or snacks such as candy, chocolate, dried fruits, nuts, cookies, cakes, pastries, cereal bars, or energy bars
- Drink mixes, commonly juice, powdered milk, instant coffee, instant tea, hot chocolate, energy drinks, protein drinks, or soft drinks
- Food supplements such as condiments, chewing gum, dietary supplements, and water purification tablets
- Tableware, typically mess kits and eating utensils (usually a single multipurpose utensil like a spoon, spork, chopsticks, or lusikkahaarukka)
- Additional items provided for personnel to use for themselves, such as multipurpose paper, napkins or tissue paper, toilet paper, matches, cigarettes (historically), and solid fuel

Field rations may come in different varieties, or carry multiple meals, for breakfast, lunch, dinner, or supper. Vegetarian, vegan, and religious diet variants may be available if a military's demographics necessitate them. Specialized variants of field rations may exist for different environments, situations, and roles, such as cold-weather warfare, mountain warfare, jungle warfare, desert warfare, long-range reconnaissance patrols, and vehicle crew variants.

The meals offered in a field ration often come in multiple different "menus" (varieties) predominantly featuring foods from a military's national or traditional cuisine—and, if diverse enough and possible under the constraints of a field ration, fusion cuisine such as soul food or Anglo-Indian cuisine—intended to evoke the "taste of home" while on deployment or away. Some rations include commercially available items, often snacks such as Tootsie Rolls, Charms, and Yorkie bars. However, basic or less-accommodating rations (usually emergency rations) may consist of very simple meals intended to provide enough nutrients and energy to keep a soldier combat-ready or alive, like compressed food bars.

Field rations are commonly issued to land forces such as armies, marines, and air force ground forces, who may spend lengthy periods of time away from fixed food sources. Navies and air forces are not commonly issued field rations as they are closely attached to the rear or steady supplies of food, prepared in galleys aboard naval vessels and flight kitchens at air bases. Rations may still be issued to personnel in certain situations or roles, like long-range flight rations for bomber, transport, and reconnaissance aircraft crews, who could otherwise spend hours in flight without food.

== Packaging ==
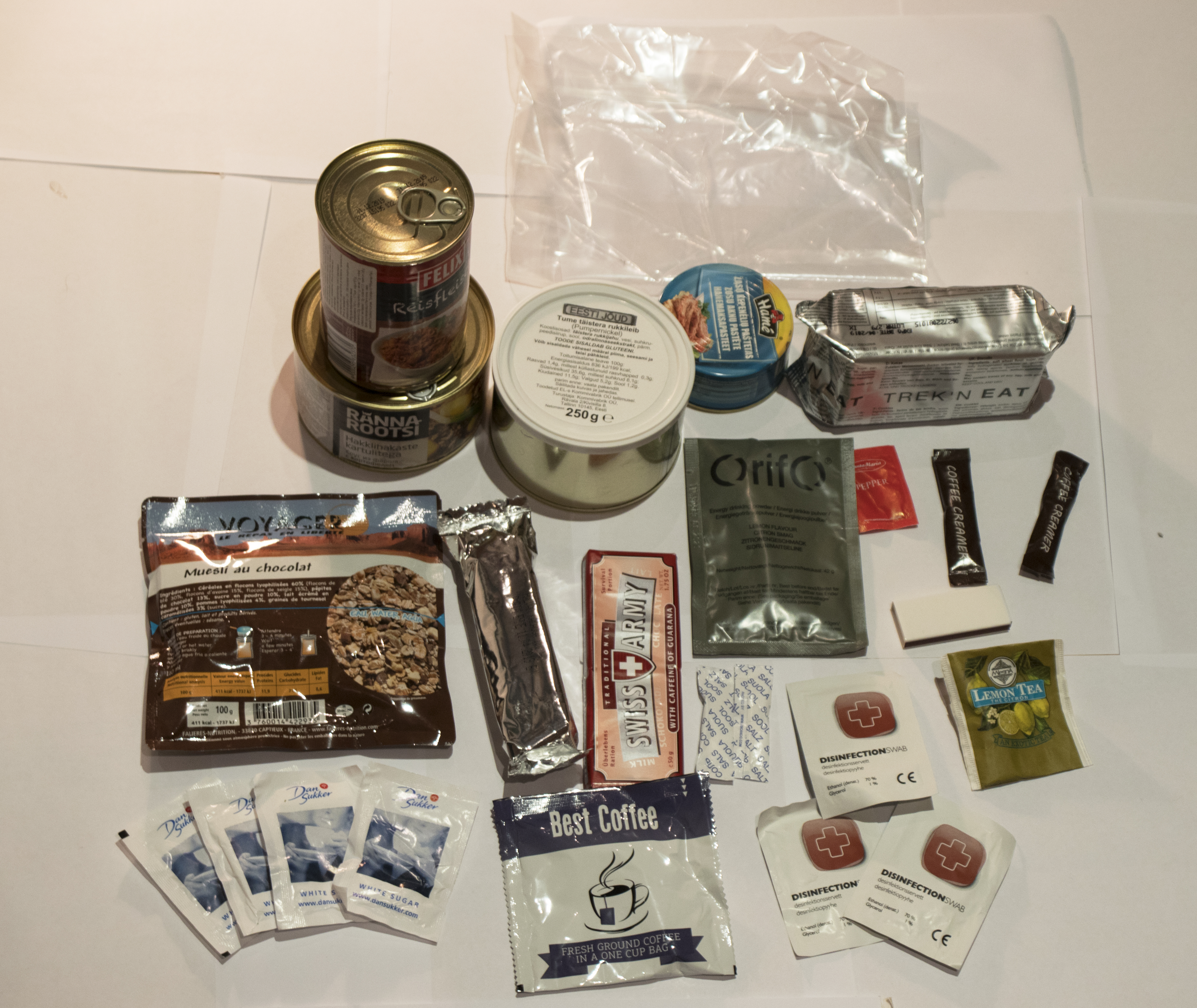
The contents of an Estonian Defence Forces field ration, featuring food in a variety of different packaging

As field rations are intended to last long, the packaging they are stored in is designed to ensure a long shelf life and prevent spoilage, while also being light and compact enough to be carried without issue. Rations are canned, vacuum-sealed, or freeze-dried foods stored in packages to prevent leakage or spoilage, commonly retort pouches, boxes, or cases. These containers are preferably easy to open anywhere, though some may require specific tools that are issued to soldiers or included in the ration package, such as the American P-38 can opener or Australian field ration eating device. Some, but not all, ration packages may be biodegradable or compostable.

NATO categorizes ration packaging under three types:

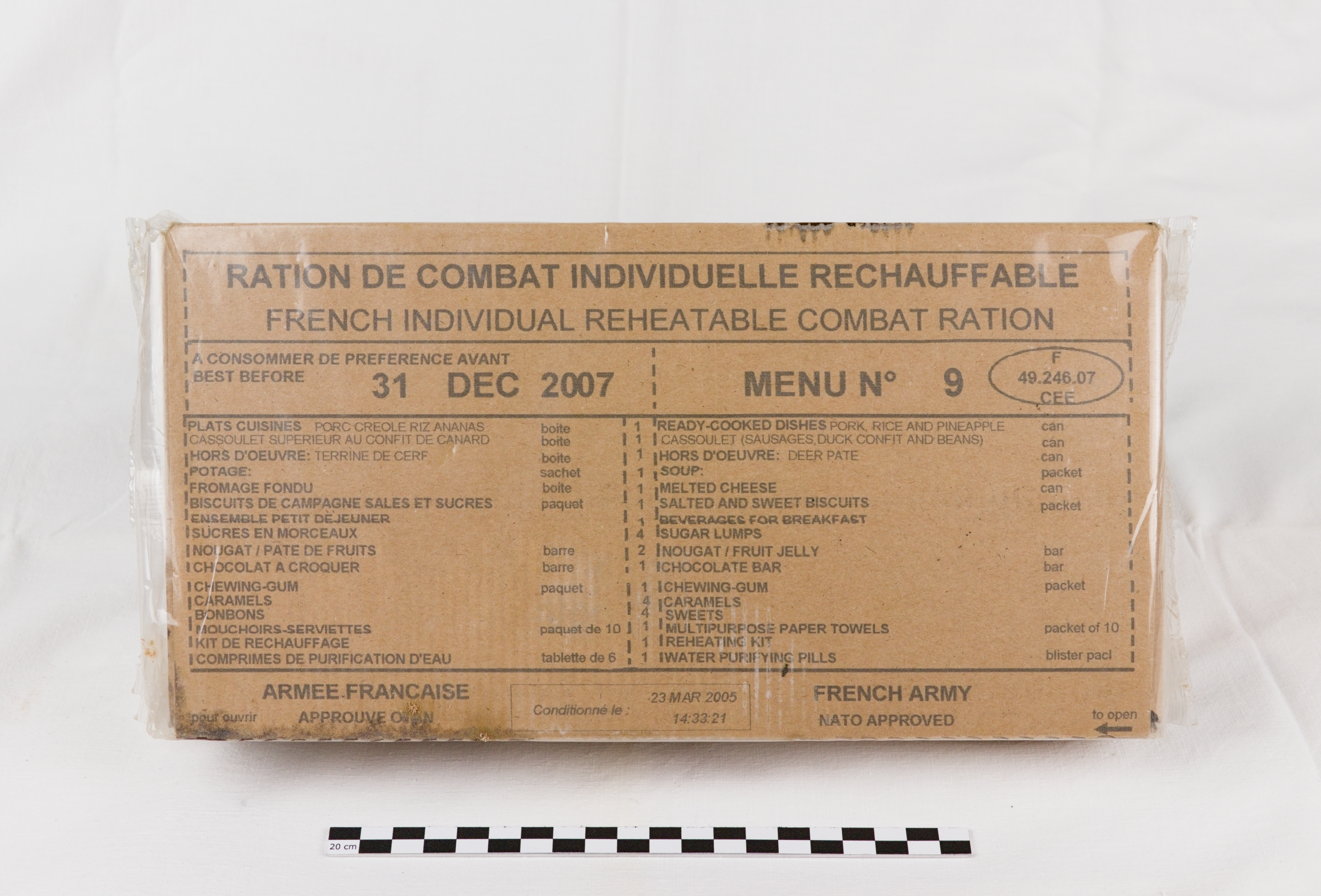
French individual reheatable combat ration, menu n°9. It is a secondary packaging.

- Primary packaging, which is in contact with or contains the food itself (e.g. a can containing food)
- Secondary packaging, which contains and groups several primary packages (e.g. a retort pouch containing food packages)
- Tertiary packaging, which contains and groups several secondary packages for storage, shipping, handling, and distribution (e.g. a box containing several rations for distribution)

== Nutrition ==
NATO bases the nutritional content requirement on a reference soldier weighing 79 kg (174 lb), who on normal operations would have an energy expenditure of approximately 3,600 kcal per day. For combat operations, energy expenditure is estimated to be 4,900 kcal per day; however, this is seen to be a worst-case scenario.

NATO standard for operational individual rations (AMedP-1.11) (General Purpose Individual Operational Ration)
| Minimum Nutrient Content Standards | | Additional Nutrient Content Recommendations | |
| Nutrient | Value | Nutrient | Value |
|---|---|---|---|
| Energy | 3,600 kcal (15,070 kJ) | Total fiber | 30 g |
| Carbohydrate | 404–584 g | Riboflavin | 1.3 mg |
| Protein | 118–185 g | Niacin | 16 mg |
| Fat | 54–140 g | Pantothenic acid | 6 mg |
| Vitamin A | 900 μg | Biotin | 30 μg |
| Thiamin | 1.2 mg | Vitamin E | 10 mg |
| Vitamin B_{6} | 1.3 mg | Vitamin K | 70 μg |
| Vitamin B_{12} | 2.4 μg | Choline | 550 mg |
| Folate | 400 μg | Phosphorus | 1,000 mg |
| Vitamin C | 45 mg | Iodine | 150 μg |
| Vitamin D | 5 μg | Selenium | 55 μg |
| Calcium | 1000 mg | Molybdenum | 45 μg |
| Zinc | 14 mg | Copper | 1.8 mg |
| Iron | 8 mg | Chromium | 35 μg |
| Magnesium | 410 mg | Manganese | 5.5 mg |
| Potassium | 3,800 mg | Fluoride | 4 mg |
| Sodium | 2,300–12,000 mg | | |

== Heating ==
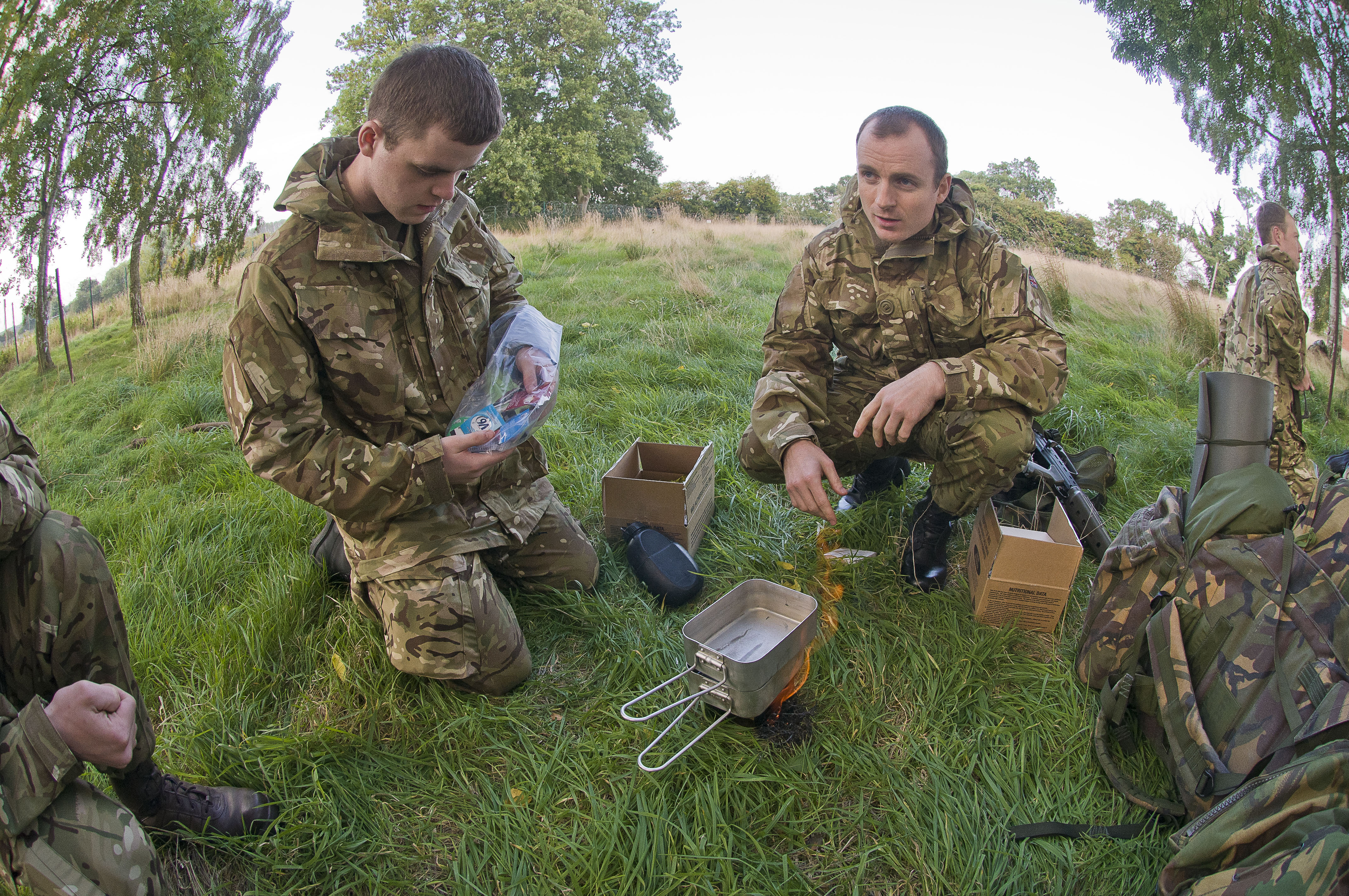
British Army Reservists cooking their field rations using a hexamine stove

Field rations can be eaten at any temperature, but are preferably heated or cooked. However, as the use of cooking appliances or fire may be unavailable or tactically unwise, smokeless solid fuel and a portable stove are typically included in rations to heat meals. Hexamine fuel tablets have traditionally been preferred, though gelatinized ethanol is also sometimes used. Some modern field rations use a flameless ration heater instead of fuel tablets.

NATO standardization states that, while main courses and entrées must be consumable without heating, main course components and hot beverages should be provided with a heater, with such items intended to be heated to a minimum temperature of 62 °C from an ambient temperature of 20 °C within 12 minutes.

== Shelf life ==
The shelf life of rations depends on the type and purpose, including how long the ration is intended to be used or kept until logistics and steady food supplies can reach the front lines. Per NATO standardization, the shelf life of a field ration from the time of delivery must be at least 24 months at a storage temperature of 25 °C; individual rations are designed to be used for a period of 30 days, after which fresh food should be given and medical screening should be conducted for nutritional deficiencies.

== History ==
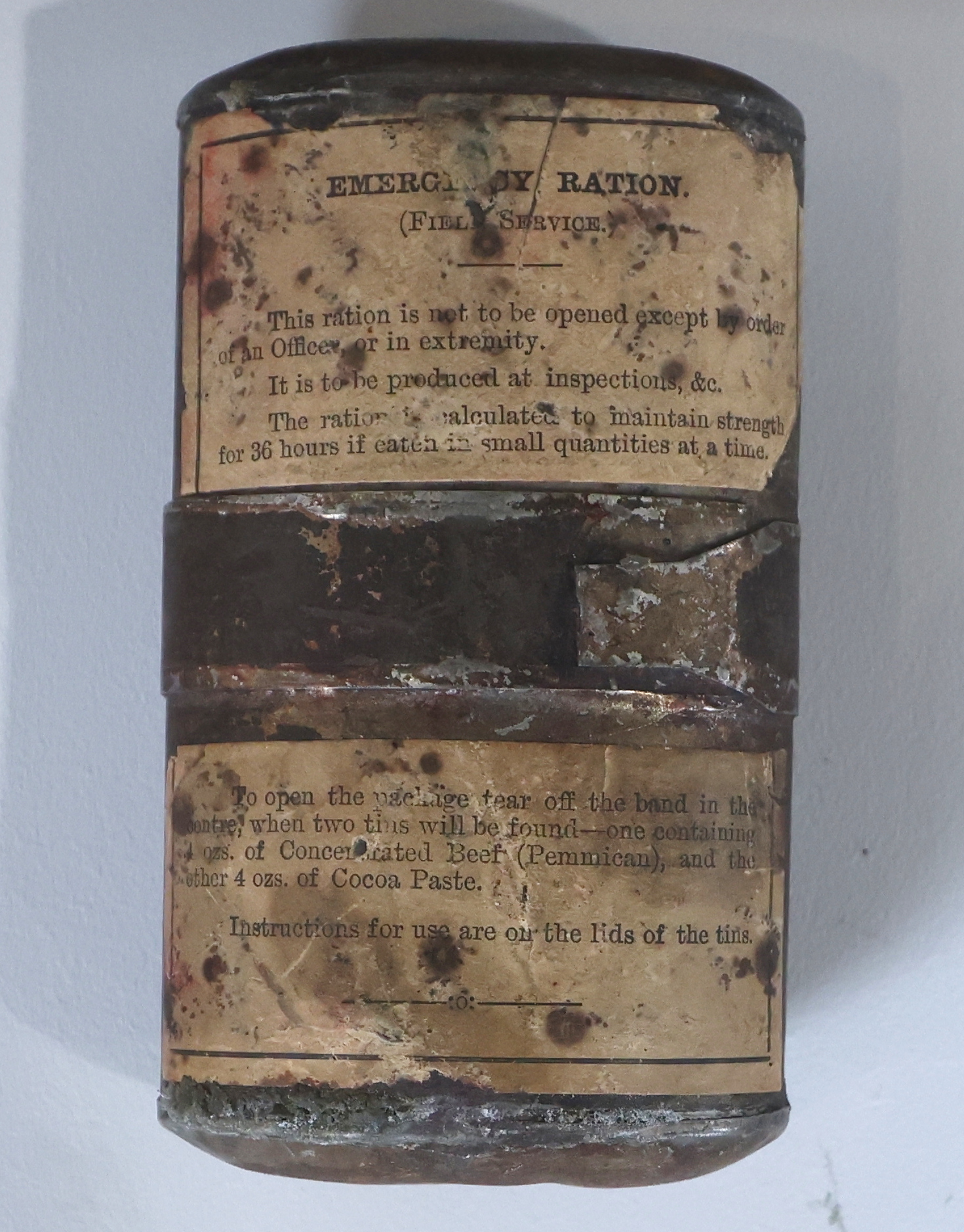
A British ration from the Second Boer War, consisting of beef pemmican and compressed cocoa powder in an early tin can

Military rations have existed since the beginnings of organized warfare. Some form of military food distribution and ration system has existed in practically every region and recorded era in history. However, for the most part, food actually brought into the field with military forces was uncommon; most of what could be considered "field rations" were, until around the early modern period, stable ingredients (such as grains), easily or already preserved foods, food soldiers brought with them, and livestock. As most reliable food preservation methods did not exist, military food at the time focused more on foods that could keep and transit well, such as hardtack, rather than foods that were nutritious. Modern field rations took recognizable forms with the inventions of airtight food preservation, tin cans, and pasteurization in the 19th century. Canned and preserved rations became standard in both World War I and World War II, with modern ration configurations being developed and becoming standard during and after the Cold War.

== By region ==
As of the 21st century, the vast majority of the world's militaries issue their own field rations, with different varieties of food based on national and cultural considerations. Many use 20th century-style packaging such as cans, boxes, and vacuum-sealed packaging, though some newer rations use retort pouch-based packaging.

== See also ==
- History of military nutrition in the United States
- Meal, Ready-to-Eat
- Military nutrition
