= Global Alliance Against Hunger and Poverty =

International treaty against hunger and poverty

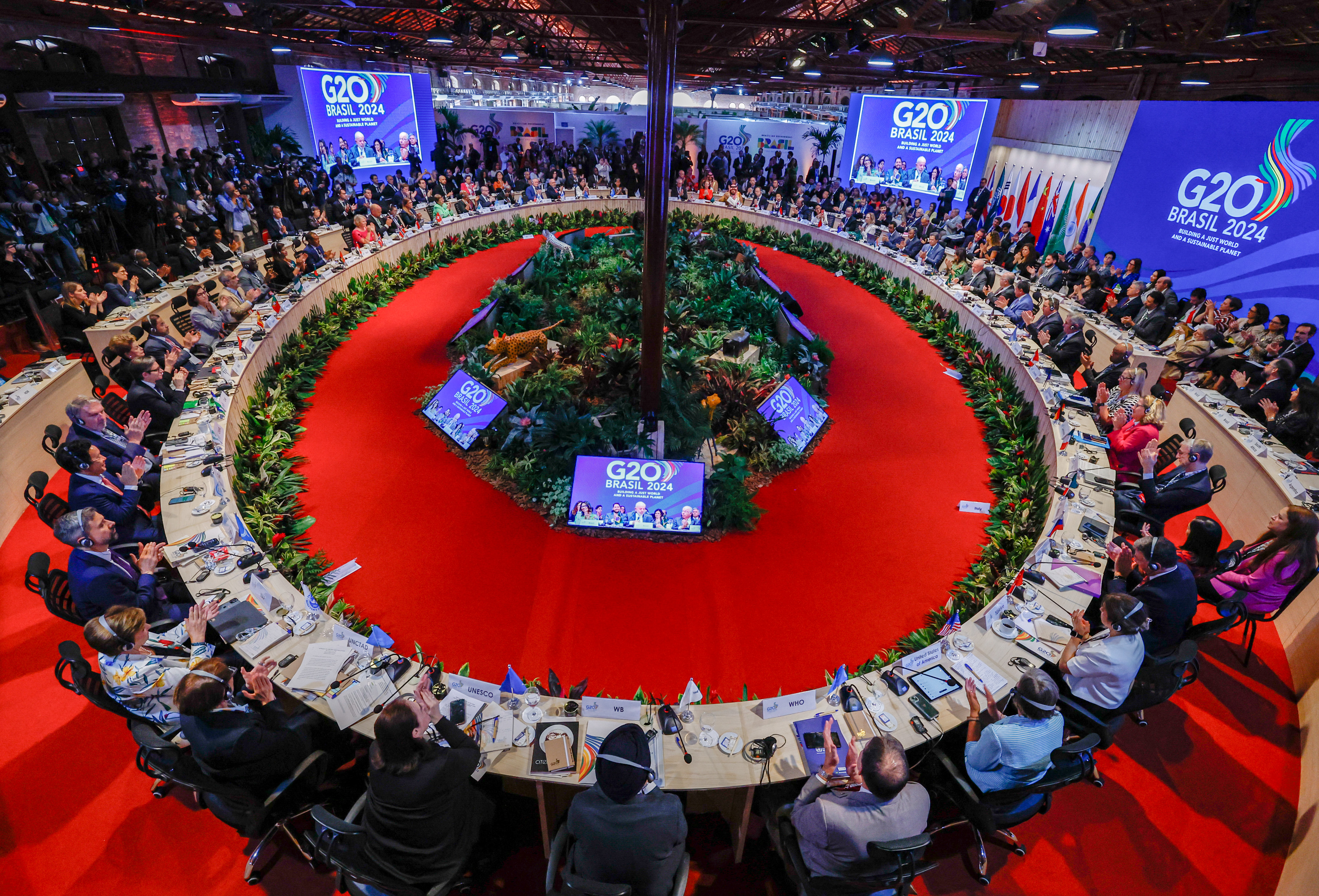
- Diplomatic conference in Rio de Janeiro that drafted the treaty
- Drafted: 24 July 2024
- Signed: 18 November 2024
- Location: Rio de Janeiro, Brazil
- Parties: 104 countries, 53 foundations, 30 international organizations, 14 international financial institutions
- Depositary: Federal government of Brazil
- Languages: Portuguese, English
- Website: www.globalallianceagainsthungerandpoverty.org

The Global Alliance Against Hunger and Poverty is a multilateral treaty that was drafted by the Federal Government of Brazil. Brazil acts as depository. The draft was adopted at a diplomatic conference in Rio de Janeiro on 24 July 2024 by the G20 countries and international organizations. The document was ratified on 18 November 2024 by 88 countries and other international organizations during the 2024 G20 leaders summit in Rio de Janeiro. As of October 2025, 104 countries, 53 foundations, 30 international organizations and 14 international financial institutions already become parties of the alliance.

In 2025 the treaty was expanded to cultivate firm support in the Caribbean region. Adding support of the Caribbean Community (CARICOM), Caribbean Development Bank and several sovereign states in the region.

== Treaty ==
The project was defined as a priority goal of the 2024 Brazilian presidency of the G20.

=== Background ===
In 2023, according to Food and Agriculture Organization's annual State of Food Security and Nutrition in the World (SOFI) report, released on 24 July 2024, more than 730 million people worldwide faced hunger in 2023, and more than 2.3 billion were moderately or severely food insecure. According to World Food Programme, if current trends continue, about 582 million people will be chronically undernourished in 2030, half of them in the African continent.

=== Goals ===
The treaty goals are to support and accelerate efforts to eradicate hunger and poverty, while reducing inequalities together with governments, organizations, financial institutions and think tanks, aimed at supporting the implementation of the new policies, depending on the reality and possibilities of the members.

=== Administrative staff and costs ===
The draft defines that Brazil, the depositary of the proposal, will bear half of the alliance's costs until 2030, with two offices, in Brasília and Rome. These offices will be responsible for connecting regions around the world in need with countries and entities willing to finance and provide technical assistance to local projects.

== Board of directors ==
As of 17 October 2025, these are the representatives that will attend the board of GAAHP.

| Region | Member | Office |
|---|---|---|
| Brazil | Wellington Dias | Co-Chairpersons |
| Spain | Eva Granados | Co-Chairpersons |
| China | Li Xin | Vice-Chairpersons |
| India | Rajib Sen | Vice-Chairpersons |
| Kenya | Dr. Lynett Ochuma | Vice-Chairpersons |
| Norway | Even Stormoen | Vice-Chairpersons |
| Portugal | Pedro Oliveira | Vice-Chairpersons |
| United Kingdom | Melinda Bohannon | Vice-Chairpersons |
| Bangladesh | Mohammad Masud Rana Chowdhury | Board of Champions |
| Egypt | Sherif Kamel | Board of Champions |
| Ethiopia | Efa Muleta Boru | Board of Champions |
| European Union | Sandra Bartelt | Board of Champions |
| Germany | Ariane Hildebrandt | Board of Champions |
| Mexico | Alejandra del Moral Vela | Board of Champions |
| Rwanda | Patrick Karangwa | Board of Champions |
| South Africa | Lebogang Botsheleng | Board of Champions |
| United Arab Emirates | Rashed AI Hemeiri | Board of Champions |

== See also ==
- World Food Programme
- Food and Agriculture Organization
- UNICEF
- Global Alliance for Improved Nutrition
