= Nutrition International (organization) =

Nonprofit organization

Nutrition International (formerly Micronutrient Initiative)
- Founded: 1992
- Founder: International Development Research Centre
- Purpose: Healthcare, education, nutrition
- Location: Ottawa, Ontario
- Region served: Worldwide
- Revenue: $42,586,795 (2016) [USD]
- Employees: 76 head office, 256 worldwide
- Website: www.nutritionintl.org

Nutrition International, formerly the Micronutrient Initiative (MI), is an international not for profit agency based in Canada that works to eliminate vitamin and mineral deficiencies in developing countries. Although often only required by the body in very small amounts, vitamin and minerals – also known as micronutrients – support an array of critical biological functions including growth, immune function and eye function, as well as foetal development of the brain, the nervous system, and the skeletal system. Micronutrient deficiency is a form of malnutrition and is a recognized health problem in many developing countries. Globally, more than two billion people live with vitamin and mineral deficiencies.

== History ==
In 1990, leaders attending the World Summit for Children set the goal of virtually eliminating micronutrient deficiencies. In 1992, Micronutrient Initiative was established as a secretariat within the International Development Research Centre (IDRC), based in Ottawa, Ontario, Canada, to support progress toward that goal. In 1993 IDRC recruited an executive director for the secretariat and transferred 2–3 of its staff to the new organization. Venkatesh Mannar took over in June 1994 as the executive director. Until 2000, MI was governed by a steering committee composed of the Canadian International Development Agency (CIDA), the IDRC, UNICEF, The World Bank, and USAID. In 2000, MI became an independent not-for-profit organization. Joel Spicer became president in February 2014. In 2017, the organization formally rebranded to Nutrition International to more accurately reflect their expanding scope, reach, and impact.

== Work ==
The organization advocates for, and provides funding and technical assistance for salt iodisation, the distribution of multi-micronutrient powders, the fortification of staple foods such as wheat flour with vitamin A, iron and folic acid, and dietary supplementation with vitamin A, iron, zinc, and folic acid. Since 1997, with funding support from the Government of Canada, Nutrition International has provided more than eight billion doses of vitamin A for use by UNICEF and national governments.

Nutrition International is credited with playing a pioneering role in engaging corporations and trade associations at both the global and national level in partnerships to improve nutrition.

== Organization ==
The staff of Nutrition International includes scientists, nutritionists, and policy and development experts. In addition to its headquarters in Ottawa, the organization has offices in Ethiopia, Kenya, Nigeria, Senegal, Afghanistan, Bangladesh, India, Indonesia, the Philippines and Pakistan.

== Publications ==
- Annual Report 2012–2013
- Investing in the future: a united call to action on vitamin and mineral deficiencies, Micronutrient Initiative, Flour Fortification Initiative, GAIN, USAID, The World Bank, UNICEF, 2008 uture.pdf
- Best Practice Paper: Micronutrient Supplements for Child Survival (Vitamin A and Zinc), Sue Horton, France Begin, Alison Greig & Anand Lakshman, Copenhagen Consensus Center
- Practice Paper: Micronutrient Fortification (Iron and Salt Iodization), Sue Horton, Venkatesh Mannar & Annie Wesley, Copenhagen Consensus Center
- Solution in a Pinch: The Micronutrient Initiative’s Double Fortified Salt strategy tackles two problems in one go, The Micronutrient Initiative
- Li, YO; Diosady, LL; Wesley, AS (2009). "Iron in vitro bioavailability and iodine storage stability in double-fortified salt". Food and Nutrition Bulletin. 30 (4): 327–35. doi:10.1177/156482650903000403. PMID 20496622.
- Johnson, QW; Wesley, AS (2010). "Miller's best/enhanced practices for flour fortification at the flour mill". Food and Nutrition Bulletin. 31 (1 Suppl): S75–85. doi:10.1177/15648265100311S107. PMID 20629354.
- Li, Yao O.; Diosady, Levente L.; Wesley, Annie S. (2010). "Iodine stability in iodized salt dual fortified with microencapsulated ferrous fumarate made by an extrusion-based encapsulation process". Journal of Food Engineering. 99 (2): 232. doi:10.1016/j.jfoodeng.2010.03.007.
