= Humanitarian daily ration =

Air-dropped food ration for disasters

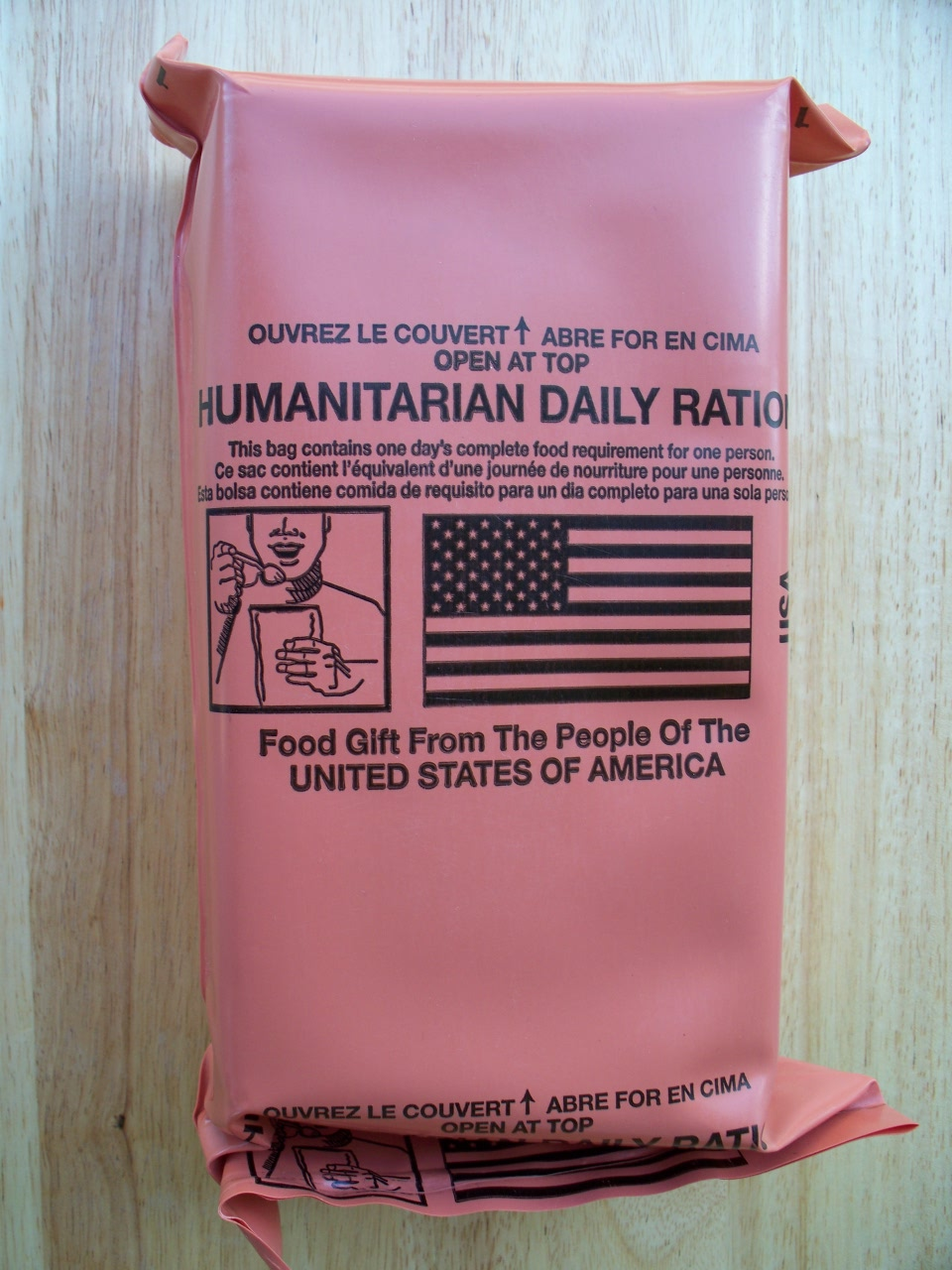
A modern humanitarian daily ration

Humanitarian daily rations (HDRs, "humrats") are food rations manufactured in the United States intended to be supplied to civilians and other non-military personnel in humanitarian crises. Each is intended to serve as a single person's full daily food supply, and contains somewhat over 2,200 calories (9,200 J). They have shelf-lives of about 3 years, and their contents are designed to be acceptable to a variety of religious and ethnic groups. The meals cost approximately one-fifth of the cost of a Meal, Ready-to-Eat (MRE), or US$4.70 in 2012. The rations were first used in Bosnia in 1993 as part of Operation Provide Promise.

The meals are designed to be able to survive being air-dropped without a parachute. This is safer for refugees than parachuting large pallets of rations, and prevents meal hoarding by those able to seize a single, large delivery.

HDRs are made available through organizations such as The Salvation Army to aid victims of poverty in the United States, and were distributed during Hurricane Katrina, Hurricane Rita and Hurricane Helene to victims of the disasters by the Federal Emergency Management Agency (FEMA).

== Background ==
Before the HDR was made available, the United States provided military Meal, Ready-to-Eat (MREs) to famine victims. Aid agencies complained that the MREs were too high in protein, indigestible, and violated religious taboos. In some cases, famine victims went into shock (see refeeding syndrome) after eating large MRE meals. By the time of the creation of the HDR, the Department of Defense had almost depleted its stock of MREs in the post–Gulf War period, having distributed 53 million MREs between 1990 and 1993. The end of the Cold War caused reductions in military funding, prompting the DoD to rethink its approach on aid. Furthermore, MRE producers found the profit in producing MRE "marginal" and wanted to expand to foreign and civilian markets. The HDR provided a solution to all these problems: it is safe to provide to famine victims, cheap enough to distribute broadly, and provides a large potential market to contractors.

== Packaging and distribution ==
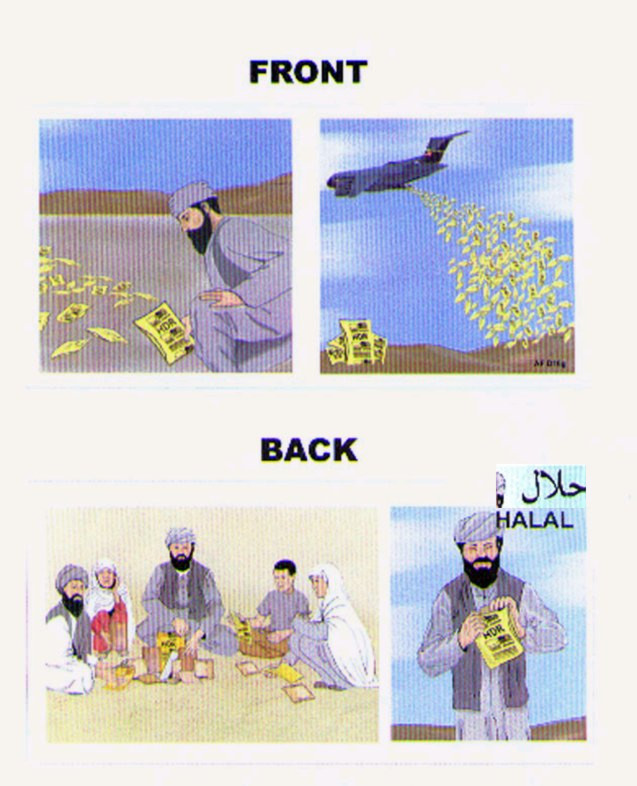
A leaflet, dropped in Afghanistan, announcing a program to drop humanitarian daily rations

The HDR packages are delivered in cases of packages. Each contains a small selection of food items based on predetermined menus, and an accessory pack containing red pepper, pepper, salt, sugar, spoon, matches, an alcohol-free moist towelette, and a napkin.

HDRs are typically air-dropped into the disaster area on large pallets. From the time they were created and used in 1993 until November 2001, HDRs were packaged with a bright yellow outer plastic covering. This choice of color proved to be problematic in areas of the world where cluster bombs were being used, as the bombs were the same shade of yellow. Recipients of the rations sometimes confused the ration package for undetonated cluster bombs, often spotting the bright color from a distance and making an incorrect assumption. This prompted the United States Federal Government to reissue the packages with a deep salmon pink outer covering to distinguish them from the bombs. This color has been used in the HDR manufacturing process ever since. Later packages were covered in salmon colored foil.

HDRs produced in the United States are manufactured by the same companies that produce MREs designed for the United States Armed Forces. Like MREs, the food components are designed so they can be consumed without requiring additional preparation, including cooking. They do not include flameless ration heaters, which are found in MREs.

== Typical contents ==
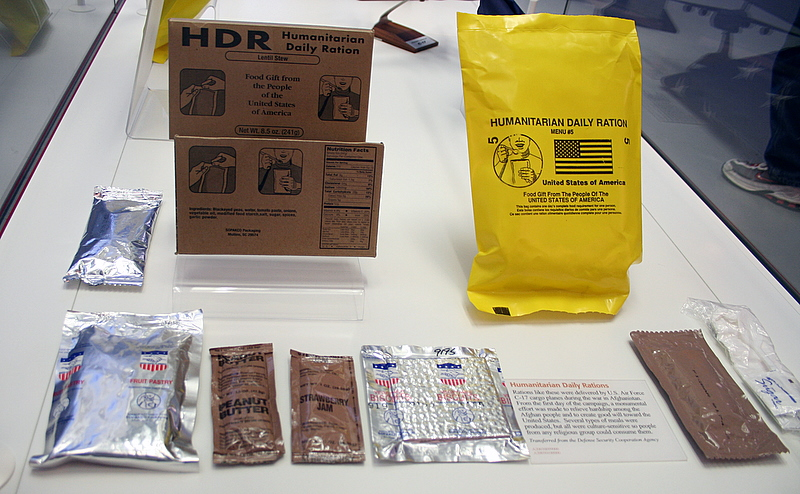
A humanitarian daily ration, in 1993–2001 yellow packaging, and typical contents on display at the National Air and Space Museum

There are five menus of HDR. Each menu contains three sub-menus, printed as list-of-content A, B, and C on the packet. Each HDR packet randomly contains two of the sub-menus.

- Main entrée, two of:
  - Lentil or barley stew
  - Yellow or herb rice
  - Red beans and rice
  - Beans and rice with tomato sauce
  - Peas in tomato sauce
  - Beans with potatoes
- Shortbread
- Fig bar
- Vegetable crackers
- Peanut butter (replaced by sunflower butter as of 2021)
- Strawberry jam
- Fruit pastry (much like a Pop-tart)
- Accessory Pack containing:
  - Book of matches (unprinted)
  - Salt, pepper, and sugar packets
  - Packet of crushed red pepper
  - Moist towelette (alcohol-free)
  - Paper napkin
  - Plastic spoon

== Specifications ==
Specifications per package
Shelf life	36 months at 80 °F (27 °C)
Weight	30 ounces (850 g)
Calories	≥ 2,200 calories (9,200 kJ)
Nutrition	/ Mass (grams) / As calorie%; Protein / 55-70 / 10-13; Fat / 67-73 / 27-30; Carbohydrates / ≥ 345 / ≥ 60; For micronutrients, see full Technical Data.
Prohibited contents	The HDR is designed to "provide the widest possible acceptance from the variety of potential consumers with diverse religious and dietary restrictions from around the world".: Contains no animal products, except a limited amount of dairy products, below the limit that would cause a problem for a person with lactose intolerance.; Any alcohol or alcohol-based ingredients are also banned.
Infant component	All rations contain a fruit paste, or pudding, suitable for feeding to infants
Utensils	All rations contain a spoon and a paper towel moistened with a non-toxic, non-alcoholic cleanser

== Deployments ==
In Bosnia, 1993, HDRs saw their first use in Operation Provide Promise, which delivered "hundreds of thousands of HDR's [sic]". By 2003, at least 12.4 million HDRs had been distributed.

List of HDR deployments
Year	Count	Location	Intended recipient	Distributor
1993	?	Bosnia	Civilian	French and US aircraft, airdrop
1993	0	India	Earthquake victims	None; rejected by Indian government because "not needed"
1994	?	DR Congo	Rwandan refugees	US military, airdrop
1995	118,000	Cambodia	Khmer Rouge defectors and displaced persons	Cambodian Red Cross, changed to Royal Cambodian Armed Forces due to theft
1995–1996	530,000	Chechnya	Civilians recovering from the First Chechen War	World Food Program (WFP)
1997	50,000	Somalia	Victims of Juba valley flooding	Concern Worldwide (NGO), contracted by UNICEF
1998	200,000	Fiji	Schoolchildren under prolonged drought	Fiji Red Cross
1999–2000	30,000	Kosovo	Civilians under Serbian blockade	International Rescue Committee (airdrop); the WFP had ~700,000 in stockpile for when land route clears
1999	60,000	Guinea	Sierra Leone refugees	WFP, UNICEF, UNHCR and several NGOs
1999–2000	300,000	East Timor	Civilians (refugee flows, flooding, ethnic violence)	WFP, Australian Defence Force
2000	~40,000	Eritrea	Internally displaced persons	WFP
2001	2,440,920	Afghanistan	Civilians	US military (number from 2003 source)
2001	?	Guinea	Refugees from Nongoa region	NGOs, via the WFP
2010	?	Haiti	Earthquake victims	WFP

=== United States program in Afghanistan ===
On October 15, 2001, the United States announced a humanitarian daily ration for Afghanistan.

On October 24, 2001, Rear Admiral John Dickson Stufflebeem announced fears that the Taliban planned to poison American food aid. Stufflebeem also said that since the program started on October 7, 2001 the United States had dropped 785,000 rations.

== See also ==
- BP-5 Compact Food
