= The Voyage of the Mimi =

1984 American educational television series

- Episode 1 opening sequence
- Genre: Educational
- Created by: Bank Street College of Education
- Written by: Richard Hendrick
- Directed by: D'Arcy Marsh
- Composer: Jeff Lass
- Country of origin: United States
- Original language: English
- No. of episodes: 13

Production
- Executive producer: Samuel Y. Gibbon Jr.
- Producers: Jeffrey Nelson; John Borden
- Cinematography: D'Arcy Marsh
- Editor: Dick Bartlett
- Production company: Peace River Films

Original release
- Network: PBS
- Release: 1984 – 1984

Related
- The Second Voyage of the Mimi

The Voyage of the Mimi is a thirteen-episode American educational television program depicting the crew of the ship Mimi exploring the ocean and taking a census of humpback whales. The series aired on PBS (Public Broadcasting Service) and was created by the Bank Street College of Education in 1984 to teach middle-schoolers about science and mathematics in an interesting and interactive way, where every lesson related to real world applications. Its budget was 3.65 million dollars with 2.65 million dollars provided by the United States Department of Education and an addition 1 million dollars provided by Holt, Rinehart and Winston.

Each video segment has accompanying student and teacher handouts or worksheets. Four software modules are available that covered topics and skills in navigation and map reading, computer literacy and programming, the elements of ecosystems, and the natural environment of whales.

The series was later released on VHS and as a LaserDisc collection. In August 2014, the series was released in digital form via iTunes U.

== Episodes ==
Each episode consists of two fifteen-minute segments: the fictional story of the voyage of the Mimi, then an expedition that reveals the science behind the storyline explored in the episode.

The first segment of each episode follows a serialized tale of scientists taking a census of humpback whales off the coast of Massachusetts. Captain Clement Tyler Granville, the owner of the sailboat Mimi, is hired by scientist Anne Abrams and her colleague Ramon Rojas to make the census. Anne's Graduate Research Assistant is Sally Ruth Cochran. In addition, the two scientists each invite a high school student (Arthur Spencer and Rachel Fairbanks) to take part in the study. Finally, Captain Granville's identically named grandson comes visiting for the summer in order to give his mother a break during her pregnancy.

Each second segment is a standalone exploration of one of the scientific principles touched on in the serialized tale. For example, there is an episode where the plot is about obtaining drinkable water, and over the course of the episode, the viewer is also given lessons about condensation, heat, and the three states of matter.

In these segments, an actor portraying one of the young people in the series, usually Ben Affleck, Mark Graham, or Mary Tanner, comes out of character and interviews a real, in many cases well-known, scientist about his or her work. These scientists include oceanographer Sylvia Earle, geologist Kim Kastens, zoologist Katharine Payne, Greg Watson of the New Alchemy Institute, and physicist Ted Taylor.

In addition, two actors in the series, Judy Pratt, a deaf student at Gallaudet University, and Peter Marston, a scientist at M.I.T., and real life owner of the Mimi, come out of character in interviews with Mary Tanner and Ben Affleck at their respective workplaces.

Episode Number	Episode Name	Expedition Title	Location/Individual
1	All Aboard	Planet Ocean	New England Aquarium
2	Setting Sail	Whale Watch	Provincetown, Massachusetts
3	On the Shoals	Mapping the Blue Part	Lamont–Doherty Earth Observatory
4	Counting Whales	Whale Bones	National Museum of Natural History
5	Going Fishing	Scraping the Bottom	Woods Hole Oceanographic Institution
6	Home Movies	Songs in the Sea	Katy Payne
7	Fastening On	Hands Full of Words	Gallaudet University, Washington, DC
8	Tracking the Whale	World's Worst Weather	Mount Washington, New Hampshire
9	Shipwrecked	Goose Bumps	Doriot Climatic Chambers, Natick, MA
10	Making Dew	Water, Water, Everywhere	Greenport, New York
11	The Feast	A New Alchemy	New Alchemy Institute, Falmouth, MA
12	Rolling Home	Boat Shop	Kennebunk River, Maine
13	Separate Ways	A Sailor and a Scientist	MIT Plasma Science and Fusion Center

== Cast ==
Cast:

- Peter G. Marston as Captain Clement Tyler Granville, C.T.'s grandfather - In real life, Marston was a scientist at Massachusetts Institute of Technology during the production of the program and also the owner of the actual Mimi at the time.
- Ben Affleck as Clement Tyler 'C.T.' Granville
- Edwin De Asis as Ramon Rojas
- Victoria Gadsden as Anne Abrams
- Mark Graham as Arthur Spencer
- Judy Pratt as Sally Ruth Cochran
- Mary Tanner as Rachel Fairbanks

Film Crew:

- D'Arcy Marsh, Director and Cinematographer
- Barbara Hanania, Assistant Cinematographer
- Roger Haydock, Gaffer
- Eric Taylor, Sound

== Location ==
The Voyage of the Mimi was shot in Gloucester, Massachusetts with some scenes being shot on Dyer Island, Maine. It marked Ben Affleck's television debut role.

== Sequel ==
A second series was produced in 1988, The Second Voyage of the Mimi, in which the two Granvilles, along with other archaeologists, searched for a lost Mayan city and uncovered a conspiracy along the way. Both series emphasized equal opportunity in math and science with a diverse cast, including race, gender, and disability status, and incorporated an instructional strategy wherein the fictionalized adventure would catch the interest of students for the initial part of the learning process. A third series, which would have been about the Mississippi River, including the river's biology and history, was planned but was not made due to an inability to obtain funding.

== The real Mimi ==
=== Beginnings ===
The Mimi was a French-built sailboat that was 72 feet (22 meters) in length, originally built in 1934 to function as a deep-hulled cargo barge. She was built in northwest France in the region of Brittany, on the coast of the Mer d'Iroise (the Iroise Sea). Mimi was a type of vessel known as a "Gabare d'Iroise," where "Gabare" translates as "cargo barge" and "Iroise" refers to the region in which she was constructed.

Mimi was initially used as a cargo ship in the rough waters of the North Sea, and was thus built to withstand serious maritime conditions. Because Mimi was a "gabare," she was also built with a shallow draft. This combination of strength and ability to operate in shallow waters allowed Mimi to be used both in the open sea and the extensive canal system in Europe at that time.

She was converted to a fishing trawler for tunafish.

=== Nazi commandeer, sinking and salvage ===
In 1942, the Germans seized the Mimi for the purpose of transporting munitions and supplies to military outposts in the region of the Brittany coast. As the Germans retreated, Mimi was not destroyed by retreating Nazi forces, but rather left tied to a tree on a mudflat.

After the war the Mimi was sunk, and remained so until the 1960s when a Frenchman and his family bought it and converted it from a trawler to a sailboat with a ketch rig.

During the 1970s, someone sailed the ship across the Atlantic Ocean to New England.

=== Television career ===
By 1984, the Mimi had a new owner, Peter Marston. The boat was kept moored in Gloucester, Massachusetts, throughout the filming of the series and thereafter. In addition to its role in "The Voyage of the Mimi," which began in 1984, the boat was used from the late 1980s through the 1990s to teach schoolchildren using the Mimi curriculum. Each school year, the Mimi sailed from New England to the Gulf of Mexico and back, stopping at pre-arranged ports of call to meet with students in grades 4 through 7, and their teachers. At each port, "Mimifests" were held, which included various activities and presentations about marine life, seamanship, and navigation. It went from city to city and acted as a tourist attraction in places such as Salem, Massachusetts, Boston, and other cities.

In 1988, Peter Marston and other freelance musicians produced a cassette, Sea Songs from the Mimi Crew, of old-time sea songs self-published under the name "The Barn School" based in Gloucester, Massachusetts. Other souvenirs were also available from the sailing vessel Mimi such as T-shirts and buttons reading "I was on board the Mimi". The souvenirs are no longer manufactured, and are even difficult to find within the online resale market.

=== Beginning of the end ===
Marston retained ownership of the vessel until 1998, when the boat was sold to new owners Captain George G. Story of Gloucester, Massachusetts, his brother Captain Alan M. Story of Deltona, Florida, and Spiro "Steve" Cocotas, also from Gloucester. They operated the vessel as Three Mates Inc. for several years, bringing the boat to as many as 28 cities along the east coast.

After years of ownership under Three Mates Inc., Mimi was repossessed for financial reasons and sold at public auction in Massachusetts. Michael Spurgeon developed a plan to resurrect the Mimi, and the vessel was subsequently purchased with venture capital provided by Spurgeon's employer, Capt. Greg Muzzy, a Boston-area entrepreneur who owns and operates the "Liberty Fleet of Tall Ships". Mimi was sailed from Gloucester to the Mystic River in Boston, where she was kept docked at various marinas in East Boston and Chelsea.

Spurgeon's intention was to rehabilitate the ship and possibly court a Discovery Channel special about Mimi's story. After spending approximately $100,000 on infrastructural investments on the ship, including a complete rebuild of the stern and diesel engine, the ship became too costly to continue work on.

In 2008, it was discovered that a homeless man had been living aboard the ship while docked at the marina, and he was promptly kicked out. In an act of revenge, the man returned and removed one of several plugs in the belly of the ship, allowing her to rapidly fill with water. Mimi sank while at port, effectively ruining all electronics aboard the ship as well as seriously damaging the recently rebuilt engine. A significant amount of damage occurred above the keel of the ship due to freshwater clams colonizing the wood while she was underwater, rendering restoration nearly impossible.

She was floated back to the surface by a recovery team two weeks later, and sat disused after that.

=== Attempted revival and final disposal ===
In the summer of 2010, two recent graduates of the University of Vermont who had been fans of The Voyage of the Mimi stumbled upon the Mimi at port and mounted an effort to save the ship, which had fallen into a state of disrepair. Their efforts ultimately proved unsuccessful, given among other factors the high cost that would be required to save the ship and the Mimi's limited historical value, so the Mimi was scrapped in July 2011.
