= The Second Voyage of the Mimi =

Television series

The Second Voyage of the Mimi is a 12-episode American educational television program depicting a fictional crew of a sailboat named the Mimi exploring Mayan ruins in Southern Mexico. Along the way, they learn about ancient civilization and also attempt to foil the plans of looters who steal the artifacts from the ancient sites. This series is a sequel to The Voyage of the Mimi, produced in 1984, in which the Granvilles rented their boat and services to zoologists studying the humpback whale in the waters off Massachusetts.

The series aired on PBS and was created by the Bank Street College of Education in 1988 to teach middle-schoolers about science and social studies.

In each episode, viewers are taught something scientific relating to plot events in the previous episode of the show. For example, an episode's plot would be about deciphering Mayan writing, and the viewer also receives information about how the Maya wrote various words and numbers.

== Cast ==
The Second Voyage of the Mimi saw a young Ben Affleck return as C.T. Granville, and Peter G. Marston as his grandfather Captain Granville. Marston was a scientist at Massachusetts Institute of Technology during the production of the program and used to own the actual ship, the Mimi.

Main Cast Listing:

- Ben Affleck as Clement Tyler "C.T." Granville
- Peter G. Marston as Captain Clement Tyler Granville
- Martha Hill as Pepper Thornton, an expert scuba diver
- Roger Cudney as Pepper's former employer, Harvey Westerman
- Hector Tellez as Pedro, an employee of Westerman's
- Inaki Carrion as Victor Cobos, an archeologist
- Cheryl Lynn Bruce as Terry Gibbs, another archeologist who works with Victor
- Carla Douglin as Quiché Gibbs, Terry Gibbs' daughter
- Enrique Lucero as Tomás Segovia, the man in charge of archeological sites in that part of Mexico
- Patricia Ancira as Rosa Segovia, Tomas Segovia's daughter, also a skilled diver

== Episodes ==
Each episode consists of two 15-minute segments.

The first segment of each episode follows the serialized tale of scientists studying the ancient Maya and getting involved with thwarting site looters. The two scientists are Victor Cobos, a Mexican man of Maya descent, and Terry Gibbs, an African-American woman. Terry's husband is revealed to have been killed by site looters eight years prior. Terry's daughter, Quiché, has grown up with archeology and can already read Maya writing. They hire the Granvilles in Quintana Roo, Mexico, near Tulum, to help them study the routes of ancient Maya ships. The Granvilles in turn hire Pepper Thornton, the daughter of one of Captain Granville's old sailing buddies, because she is an expert diver. Previously, Pepper worked for Harvey Westerman, a skinflint tour operator, guiding tourists on dives through then reefs.

Each second segment is a standalone exploration of one of the scientific principles touched on in the serialized tale. In these second segments, one of the child actors (Ben Affleck or Carla Douglin) comes out of character and interviews real, in many cases well-known, scientists abouts their work. These scientists include archeologists Bill Fash, Peter Reynolds and David Stuart, and rain forest ecologist Nalini Nadkarni. Additionally, Martha Hill, a silver medalist in the Winter Paralympics, comes out of character in an interview with Ben Affleck at the beginning of the information segment titled "Expedition 1 If I can Do This".

| Episode Number | Episode Name | Expedition Name |
|---|---|---|
| 1 | A Charter to the Past - Tulum | If I Can Do This! - Jackson Hole |
| 2 | A Tomb in the Jungle - Palenque | Sweating It Out - Doriot Climatic Chambers |
| 3 | A Light in the Dark | As the Earth Turns - Royal Observatory, Greenwich |
| 4 | The Underworld | The Incredible Shrinking Head! - North American Hyperbaric Center - City Island, Bronx |
| 5 | A Stone Puzzle | Feeling the Pressure - North American Hyperbaric Center - City Island, Bronx |
| 6 | Cracking the Code | Written in Stone - Copán, Honduras |
| 7 | The Quest Begins | The Ancient Farm |
| 8 | A Road To Danger | Venom: A Scorpion Tale - Alejandro Alagón, MD, PhD |
| 9 | A Friendly Village | Curandera - Mexico City |
| 10 | Discoveries | Up a Tree - Costa Rica - Nalini Nadkarni |
| 11 | Found and Lost | In the Canopy - Monteverde Cloud Forest Reserve |
| 12 | The Fate of a King | One Stone at a Time - Cathedral of St. John the Divine |
