= AMRL =

AMRL may refer to:

- Armored Medical Research Laboratory, U.S. Army
- AASHTO Materials Reference Laboratory, part of the American Association of State Highway and Transportation Officials
- Aeronautical & Maritime Research Laboratory, part of the Australian Defence Science and Technology Group
