= History of military nutrition in the United States =

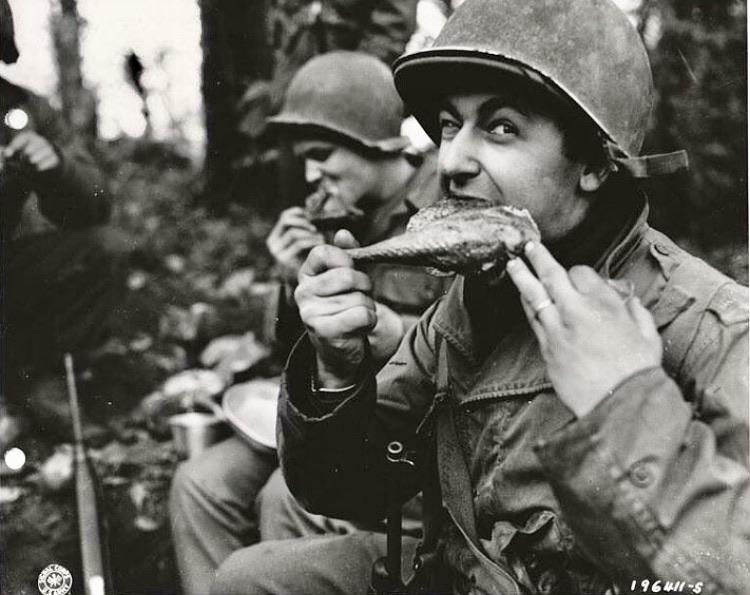
A United States Army soldier eating turkey on Thanksgiving during the Siegfried Line campaign, 1944

The history of military nutrition in the United States can be roughly divided into seven historical eras, from the founding of the country to the present day, based on advances in food research technology and methodologies for the improvement of the overall health and nutritional status of U.S. military service members. Through the research and guidance of medical and military professionals, rations and packaging have been consistently and dramatically improved.

== General history ==
The first formal institution for U.S. military nutrition research was created in 1917, when the Surgeon-General's office established a Food Division for "safeguarding the nutritional interests of the Army." Currently, the U.S. military nutrition research is presided over by the DoD Combat Feeding and Research Program (CFREP), providing a research, technology and engineering base for all combat feeding systems. The Army is the executive agent for the Combat Research and Engineering Board (CFREB; formerly known as the Food and Nutrition Research and Engineering Board). Chaired by the office of the director, defense research and engineering, the CFREB includes representatives from Army Navy, Air Force, Marine Corps and the Defense Logistics Agency.

The Military Nutrition Division at the U.S. Army Research Institute of Environmental Medicine (USARIEM) has been at the forefront of Military Nutrition Research since 1986, and addresses physical, physiological and nutritional requirements of modern military personnel.

== Eras ==
=== 1775–1917 ===
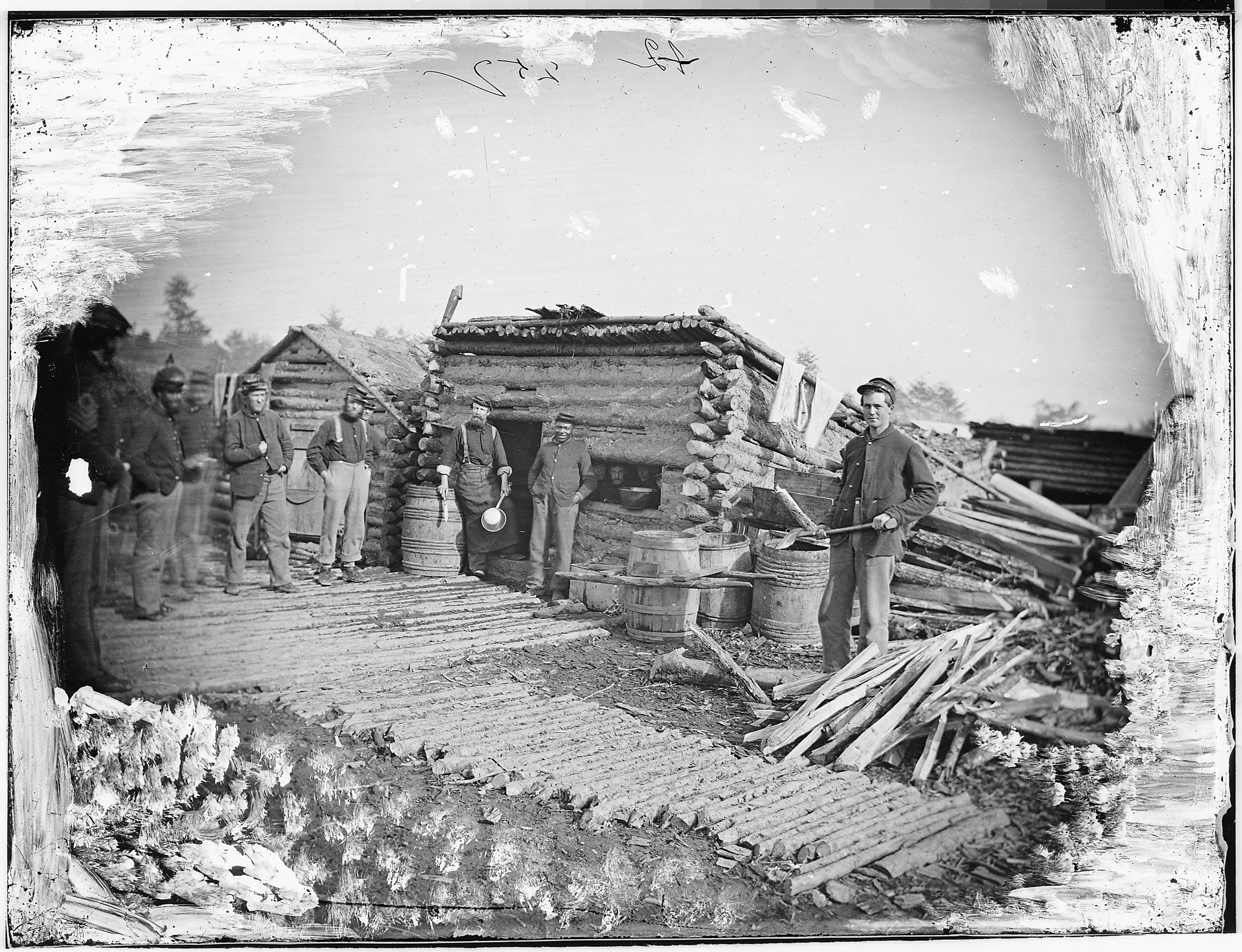
The camp kitchen of the Union Army 6th New York Heavy Artillery Regiment near Brandy Station, Virginia, 1864

In 1775, the Continental Congress stipulated that all enlisted persons of the Continental Army should receive peas, beans, or vegetables and one pint of milk per man in addition to their provision of meat and bread. For the time, this was a significant recognition of the need to include fresh food in the military diet. As food preservation and refrigeration techniques had not been perfected at the time (late 18th century), perishables were rarely delivered in edible condition to soldiers in the field. Without fresh fruits and vegetables, many soldiers suffered death or illness by such diseases as scurvy. As a result, the overall health and morale of American soldiers suffered.

Aware of the situation, General George Washington wrote a letter to Congress suggesting new personnel be hired to correct issues in the Commissary Department. Congress then directed the Board of War to supply sauerkraut, vegetables, vinegar, beer and cider to troops.

A few decades later, in response to a 12,000 franc award offered by Napoleon Bonaparte for the creation of a method to preserve food for armies, Nicholas Appert developed a method to preserve food in airtight bottles. Samples of Appert's preserved foods were sent to sea with Napoleon's men and the food remained fresh for several months. Ten years later, Pierre Durand, a British merchant, patented a similar method using tin-coated canisters, and by 1813, the British Army and Navy were supplied with food preserved in tins.

During the American Civil War, conditions prevented adequate supply and delivery of all ration components to troops. Typhoid, diarrhea, and dysentery, easily spread by contamination of water and food supplies, were widespread, and fatalities caused by these diseases were common.

In 1861, the Army of Virginia published Directions for Cooking by Troops in Camp and Hospital, an Army camp cooking manual written by Florence Nightingale. The recipes emphasized meat and milk for protein and whole grains, fruits, and vegetables for carbohydrates. The first US Family Food Guide (1916) was published 35 years later, with essentially similar recommendations.

In 1861, John Ordronaux's Hints on the Preservation of Health in the Armies was published containing the first known dietary guidelines for soldiers, identifying priorities of an effective military diet.

After the Civil War, the 1892 ration was developed, providing for fresh meat, fish and vegetables. Although advances had been made in food processing, preservation, storage and refrigeration techniques, food often spoiled over long distances or in warm climates, as these techniques had not been perfected. During the Spanish–American War, many soldiers suffered serious illness as the result of rotten or fermented food. Also in 1892, Captain Charles Woodruff conducted the first military nutrition survey, and earned the title "foremost student of the diet of the American soldier". Through his research, he observed gradual improvement in the quality of Army rations and noted the need for further research and development to ensure the continuation of this trend.

While rations continued to improve, broad distribution of perishable foods did not occur until World War I, when technological advances made it possible to supply camps with fresh meats, eggs, dairy products and vegetables. While overseas, American soldiers consumed the generally adequate Pershing garrison rations, which lacked dairy and vegetable products. Problems such as these were overcome later with the development of the "New Army Ration".

=== 1917–1941 ===
Facing food shortages in both military and civilian populations during World War I, it was important to address reports of food wastage at military training camps. The Division of Food and Nutrition of the Medical Department, U.S. Army (established in 1918 by the War Department) instructed that nutritional surveys should be conducted to assess food requirements and economy. Findings showed that garrison rations were providing an excess of food, were nutritionally unbalanced and had a high fat content. Based on these findings, a new "training ration" was developed to avoid waste.

The first issue of the Journal of Nutrition was published in 1928 by the American Institute of Nutrition (AIN). AIN was the first independent scientific society for researchers in the field of nutrition. It was cofounded by an Army nutrition officer, John R. Murlin.

While military nutrition research came to a stop between World War I and World War II, the League of Nations established the Commission on Nutrition to make detailed recommendations based on sound scientific principles of nutrition. The Commission's Mixed Committee on the Problem of Nutrition published its final report, emphasizing the importance of foods such as green leafy vegetables, fruit and milk.

=== 1941–1953 ===
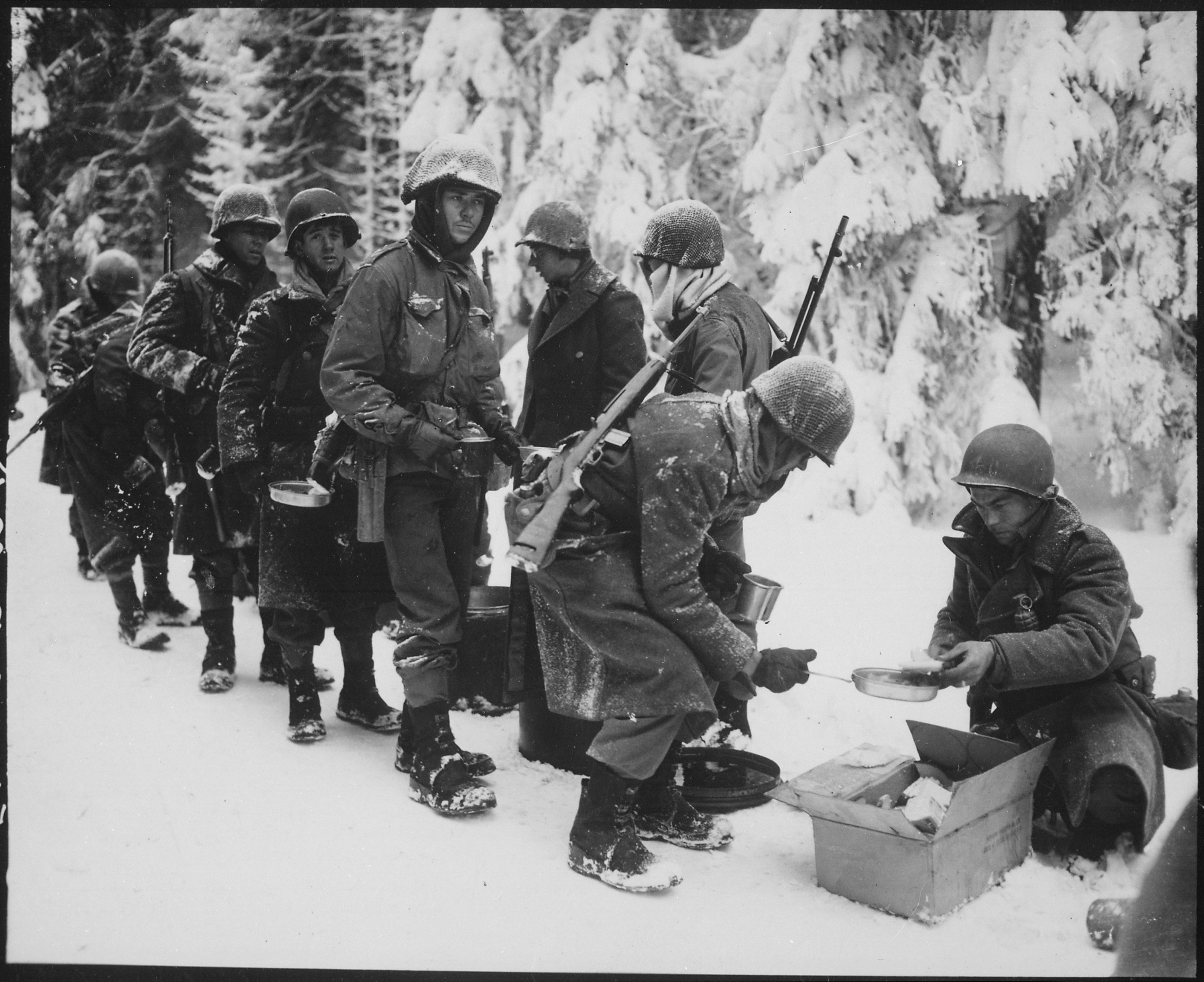
Soldiers of the U.S. Army 37th Infantry Division being served food near La Roche-en-Ardenne, Belgium in 1945

In response to an observation of poor nutritional status among enlisting men, the National Academy of Sciences and the National Research Council created a force that defines the minimum need and safety margin for nutrient intake. Using available data, the task force specified a tentative set of allowances, intended to address the nutritional needs of civilians and military personnel. These allowances eventually became the Food and Nutrition Board's Recommended Dietary Allowances.

The Medical Nutrition Laboratory (formerly the Food and Nutrition Laboratory, founded in 1942) along with the Medical Nutrition Laboratory of the Quartermaster Food and Container Institute developed and subsequently improved the individual D-, K-, C-, and emergency rations. By June 1945, the Army had 157 nutrition officers. Between 1941 and 1946, more than 30 field ration surveys were conducted to assess health, performance and nutritional status of troops in different environments. In 1949, Congress authorized the construction of a new Quartermaster research facility in Natick, Massachusetts. After several name changes, the facility would eventually be known as the U.S. Army Natick Soldier Research Development and Engineering Center.

=== 1953–1974 ===
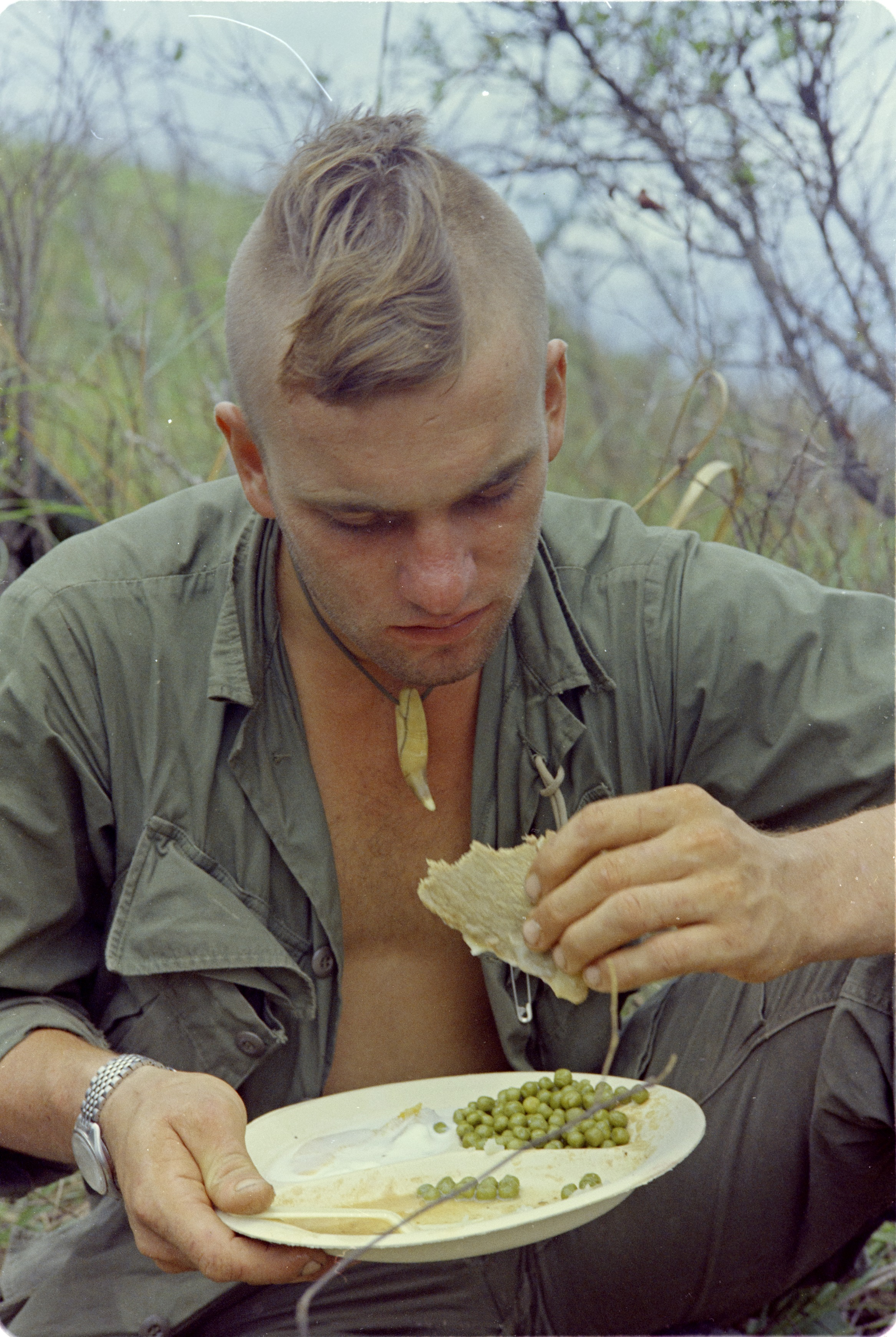
A soldier with the U.S. Army 101st Airborne Division eating his first hot meal in several days during the Vietnam War in 1967

In 1958, the year the Meal, Combat, Individual ration was introduced, the Army's Medical Nutrition Laboratory in Chicago, Illinois, and the Research and Development Department of Fitzsimons General Hospital in Aurora, Colorado, were combined to form the U.S. Army Medical Research and Nutrition Laboratory (USAMRNL). This institution quickly became known as the nation's leading laboratory for human nutrition research and conducted broad and extensive studies. In 1973, the USAMRNL moved to San Francisco and became the Letterman Army Institute of Research (LAIR). Meanwhile, in 1955, the Interdepartmental Committee on Nutrition for National Defense (ICNND) was established to address nutritional problems. After reorganization in 1967, the ICNND published a Ten State Nutrition Survey, exploring issues such as serious hunger, malnutrition and related health concerns. The findings of this report spurred the creation of the Food Stamp program (1974), nutrition programs for the elderly, the Women, Infants and Children (WIC) supplemental nutrition program (1972), the United States Department of Agriculture school breakfast program (permanently authorized in 1975), military dietary reform, and the establishment of NIH-funded Nutrition Research Centers.

=== 1974–1980 ===
The Letterman Army Institute of Research (LAIR) was at the forefront of Military Nutrition Research and conducted studies in various areas of medicine, optics, toxicology and nutrition throughout the latter half of the 1970s. Nutrition research targeted the development of new methodologies for the measurement of nutrient intake, identification of contaminants in food, assessment of the nutritional adequacy of the soldier's diet, and assessment of feeding system changes at selected military dining facilities. Scientists also conducted studies exploring the specific roles and mechanisms of nutrients such as vitamin A, vitamin C, carbohydrates, thiamin, iron and several others. Although driven primarily by military concerns, scientists at LAIR and its predecessor labs also contributed essential knowledge to the general understanding of nutrition as it applies to the human body. Among other things, they established requirement recommendations for water, vitamins, and minerals and provided insight on the effects of calorie deprivation.

In the late 1970s, a series of Army management decisions and congressional directives threatened to abolish the nutrition research program at LAIR. Dr. Allan L. Forbes argued strongly for the continuation of nutrition research at LAIR, noting "it would be tragic in the extreme to see dissolution of the finest clinical nutrition research facility we have." The Army Nutrition Research Program was suspended in 1980 after Army and Congressional priority decisions. All assets from the Army's military nutrition program were transferred to the USDA's Western Human Nutrition Research Center in Davis, California.

=== 1980–1986 ===
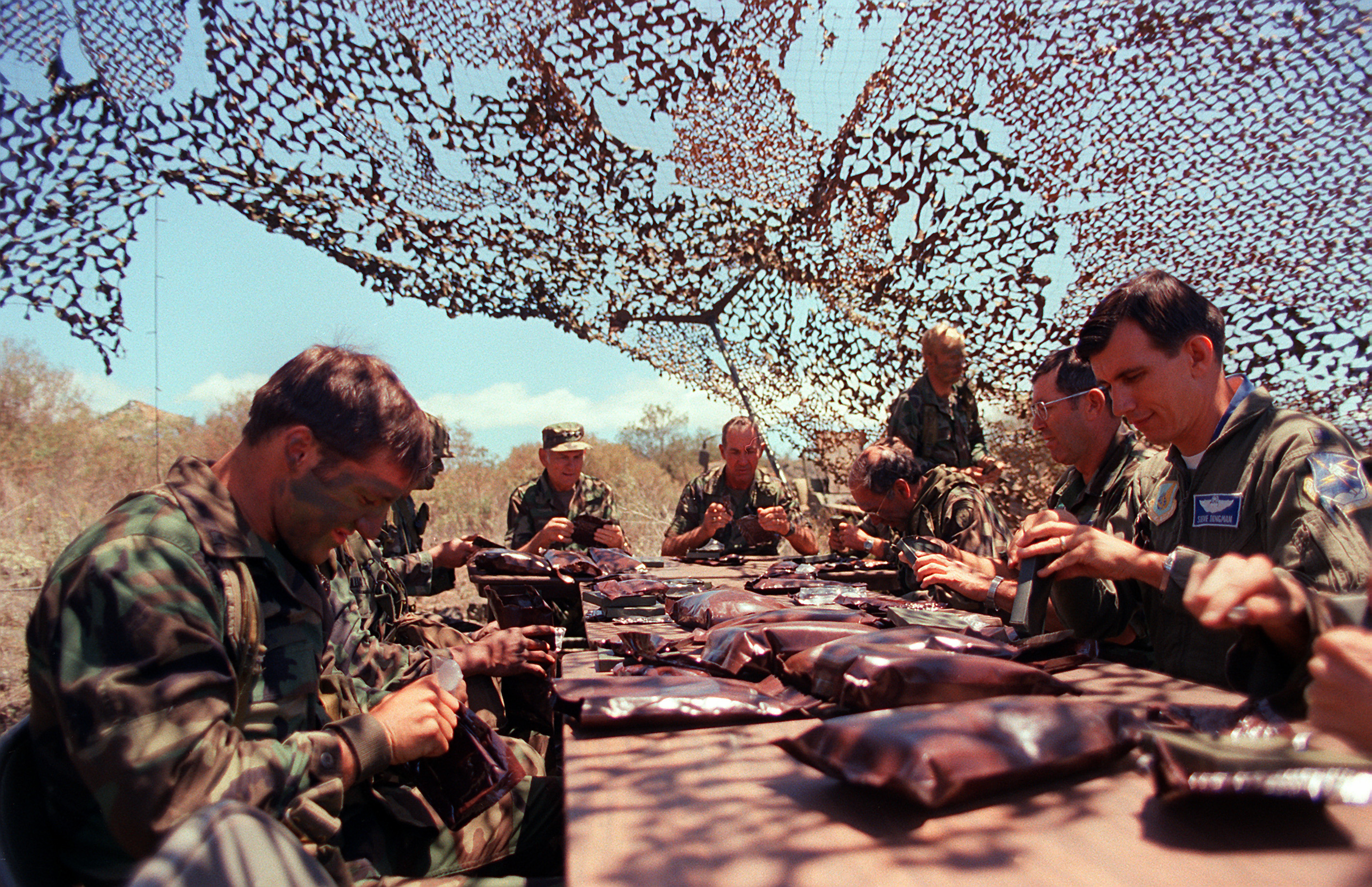
U.S. Army officials in Hawaii testing then-experimental Meal, Ready-to-Eat rations in 1983

Although the Army Research Program had been suspended, the Department of Defense continued to conduct nutrition research. During the early 1980s, some military nutrition studies continued at the Naval Health Research Center, the Naval Submarine Medical Research Laboratory, the Food Engineering Laboratory at the Natick Research and Development Laboratories, the Army Institute of Surgical Research, the Army Medical Research Institute of Infectious Diseases, and the Walter Reed Army Institute of Research. After the National Research Council's Advisory Board on Military Personnel Supplies (ABMPS) observed that insufficient attention was paid to nutrition by armed services food programs, funding was granted to establish a Food and Nutrition Board (FNB) Committee on Military Nutrition Research (CMNR). Since its creation in 1982, the CMNR has published more than 50 reports containing analysis, guidance and recommendations to the Department of Defense on nutrition-related priorities.

During the 1980s, new feeding systems were developed, including the Meal, Ready-to-Eat (MRE) and T-rations. MREs are complete meals in flexible pouches that replaced the less adequate C-ration. The heat-and-serve tray-pack T-ration was developed to provide the option of a hot meal when cooks were unavailable. In 1983, field trials began to test the adequacy of the MRE ration for long-term subsistence, leading to concerns about weight loss. Following these trials, a new military nutrition research division known as the Nutrition Task Force was established at the U.S. Army Research Institute of Environmental Medicine. One of the Nutrition Task Force's first objectives was to complete an intensive field trial of rations to test ration acceptance and intake over extended periods of time. The second half of the 1980s saw continued investment in military nutrition research and in 1986, the Nutrition Task Force became the Military Nutrition Division.

=== 1986–present ===
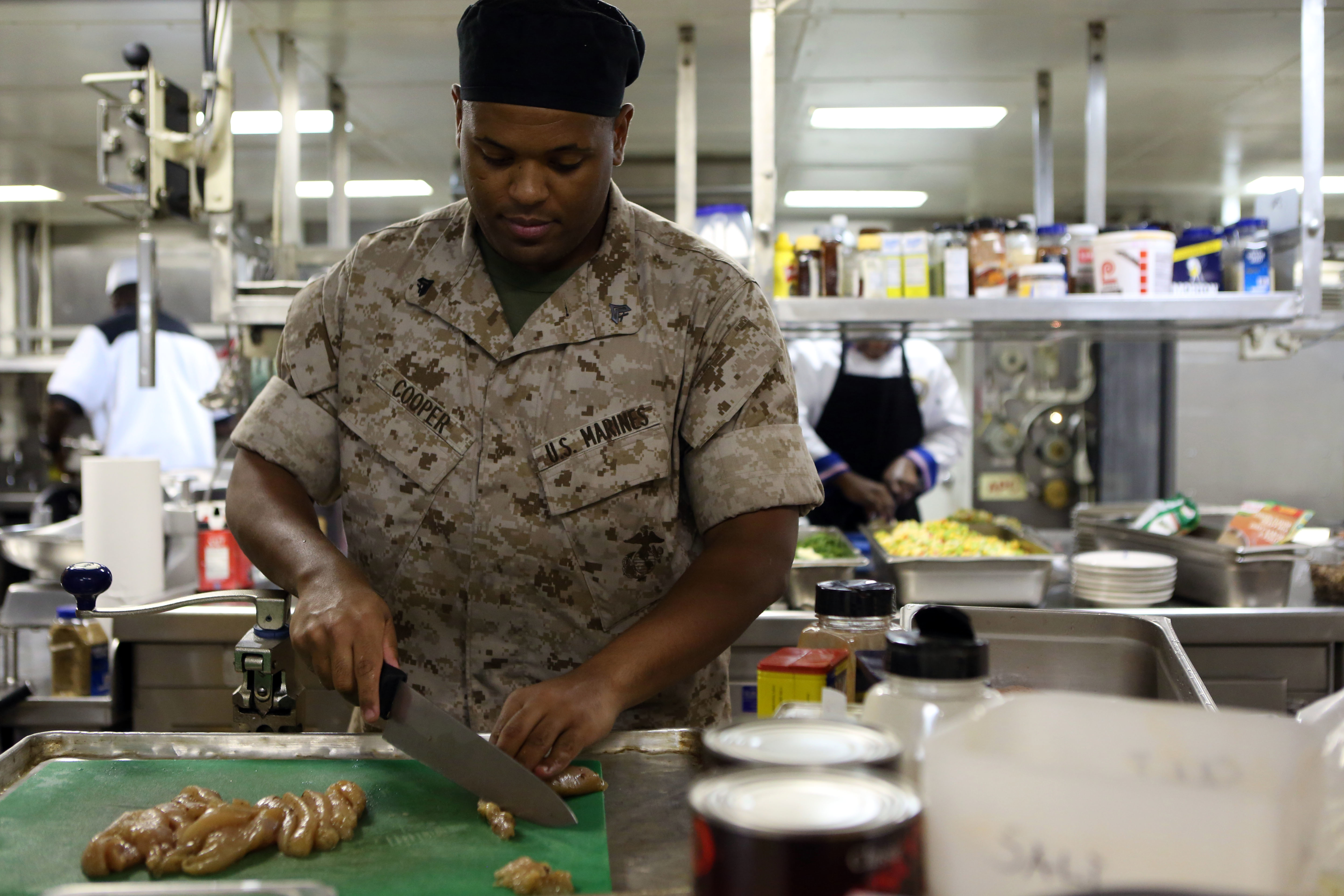
A cook of the U.S. Marines 24th Marine Expeditionary Unit preparing fresh meals aboard the USS Iwo Jima (LHD-7)

In 1986, the U.S. Army retook the lead in basic and applied military nutrition science, presided over by the Department of Defense Combat Feeding and Research Program (CFREP), and providing a research, technology and engineering base for combat feeding systems. Since then, the Military Nutrition Division at the U.S. Army Research Institute of Environmental Medicine (USARIEM) has been at the forefront of physical, physiological, and nutritional requirements research to address the needs of modern military personnel.

The Military Nutrition Division, in collaboration with the Pennington Biomedical Research Center, has made several scientific advances in understanding the energy and nutritional requirements of healthy individuals performing in extreme environments, addressed comprehensive menu modification and enabled the development of improved food composition databases, and developed weight control intervention programs for soldiers. This alliance has also allowed for investigation of performance-enhancing ration components (PERCs), improving human performance by at least 15%, and leading to developments such as the Soldier Fuel energy bar and the ERGO (Energy Rich Glucose Optimized) energy drink.

During the 1990s, several nutrition studies were conducted, including studies on nutritional influences on immune function, nutritional interventions and susceptibility to disease during high-stress training, and the role of energy balance in disease resistance. The latter study directly led to changes in food allowances for U.S. Army Ranger training and other high-intensity programs. In this period, the A-ration, B-ration, and T-ration were replaced by the Unitized Group Ration.

Through modern research, ration and hydration requirements have been defined for soldiers and personnel working in high altitudes and in extreme temperatures. Working alongside scientists at the Pennington Biomedical Research Center, scientists of the Military Nutrition Division at USARIEM continue to improve ration technologies, address nutrition concerns, establish new programs for soldier weight management and otherwise optimize soldier performance through military nutrition research.

== See also ==
- United States military ration
- Foods of the American Civil War
- List of military food topics
