= Force Provider =

Containerized deployable military base

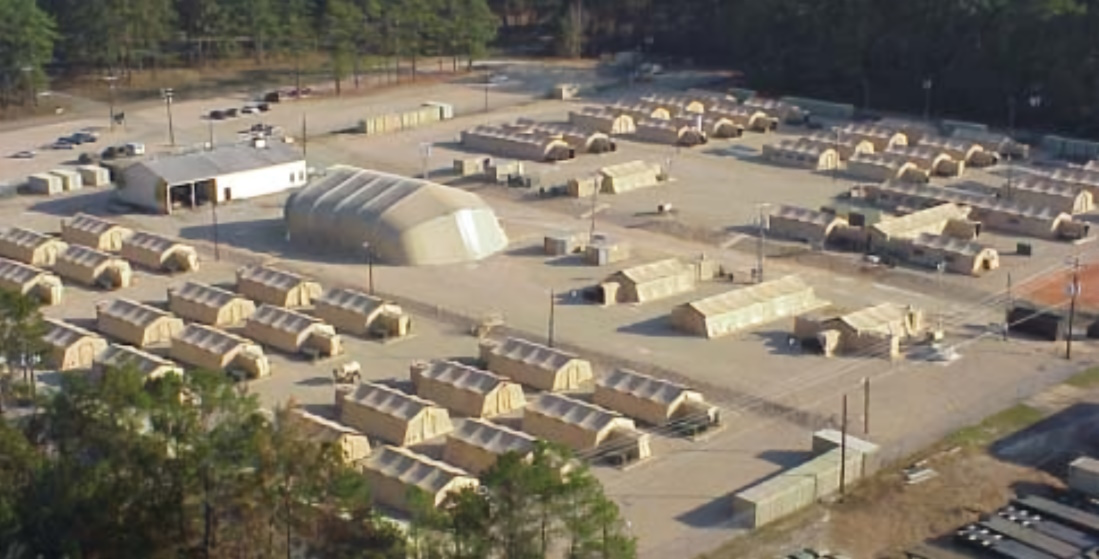
Force Provider module

Force Provider is a deployable base system developed by the United States Army to provide rest and relief facilities for soldiers. Each containerized package provides air conditioned/heated billeting, dining, laundry, latrine and recreational facilities for a battalion-sized force of up to 550 soldiers and the 50 personnel required to operate it. Based around the use of TEMPER tents, it includes the capability to store and distribute 80,000 gallons of water, 40,000 gallons of fuel, and generate 1.1 megawatts of continuous power. It takes on average three to four days to prepare a Force Provider camp site, typically 10 acres of land, then five to six days to set it up and make the camp operational. Six packages can be combined to support a brigade-size force of 3,300 soldiers. Although its primary mission is to support front-line soldiers, Force Provider can be utilized for other missions such as humanitarian aid and disaster relief.

== History ==
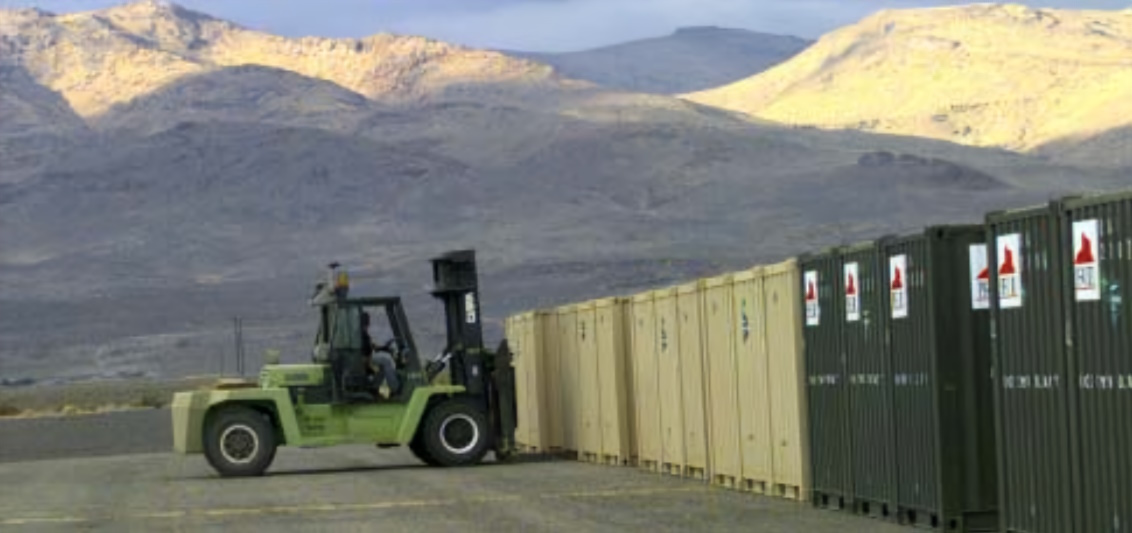
Force Provider containers are prepared for transfer from Sierra Army Depot, California

Development of Force Provider began after the Gulf War, where Army soldiers were provided outdated tents and makeshift facilities with minimal comforts, especially in comparison to the Air Force's modern Harvest Falcon system. The intention was to rotate soldiers out of front-line positions to spend up to a week at a Force Provider complex. Amenities would include private hot showers; field laundry service; field kitchen with cook-prepared hot meals; and (depending on circumstances) morale and recreation services such as a movie theater, post office, barber, or outdoor sports.

The system underwent accelerated testing and development from 1991 to 1994, with an expected delivery of the first two modules by December 1996. Six Quartermaster Force Provider companies were planned, each company consisting of six platoons which were each responsible for setting up and operating one Force Provider module. However, in order to support Task Force Eagle's deployment to Bosnia and Herzegovina, interim support packages were created out of existing Army stock and staffed by civilian contractors. Despite some setbacks, the deployment of these packages was considered largely successful in providing warm, sanitary living and recreational facilities for more than 5,000 personnel.

By 2000, five Quartermaster companies had been designated as Force Provider units: the 488th Quartermaster Company (Force Provider) in active service, and the 216th, 542d, 691st, and 802d companies in the Army Reserve. At full strength a company would have six platoons, each capable of operating one Force Provider package.

== Components ==
As of 2010, each Force Provider package was stored in 71 TRICON containers and consisted of the following items as standard. Add-ons included cold-weather modification system, prime-power modification system, electric kitchen, and shower water reuse system.

- Eight latrine systems
- Eight shower systems
- Four kitchen systems
- Four refrigerated containers
- Batch laundry system
- 26 60-kilowatt tactical quiet generators
- 26 modular personnel tents
- Four 400,000 BTU water heaters
- Four fuel distribution systems
- Two wastewater evacuation tank/trailers
- 26 mobile electric power distribution systems
- 56 environmental control units
- Eight diesel engine-driven air compressors (17 cubic feet/min)
