= Armed Forces Recipe Service =

The Armed Forces Recipe Service is a compendium of high-volume foodservice recipes written and updated regularly by the United States Department of Defense Natick Laboratories and used by military cooks and by institutional and catering operations. It originated in 1969 as a consolidation of the cooking manuals of the four main services and is based on previous military publications dating back to the first standardization efforts in the US Army in 1896. Recipes are based primarily on American cookery, with the addition of specialized items such as vegetarian, kosher and halal recipes to meet more specialized needs of those being served. The Service database is now distributed by the Joint Culinary Center of Excellence, a division of the US Army Quartermaster School based in Fort Gregg-Adams, Virginia.

Each recipe card has a standardized format; each recipe is calibrated to feed 100 people, with a basic nutritional analysis across the top of the card. Traditionally available primarily in print format, the AFRS database is also available electronically.
