= Foods of the American Civil War =

U.S. military rations and civilian food during the American Civil War

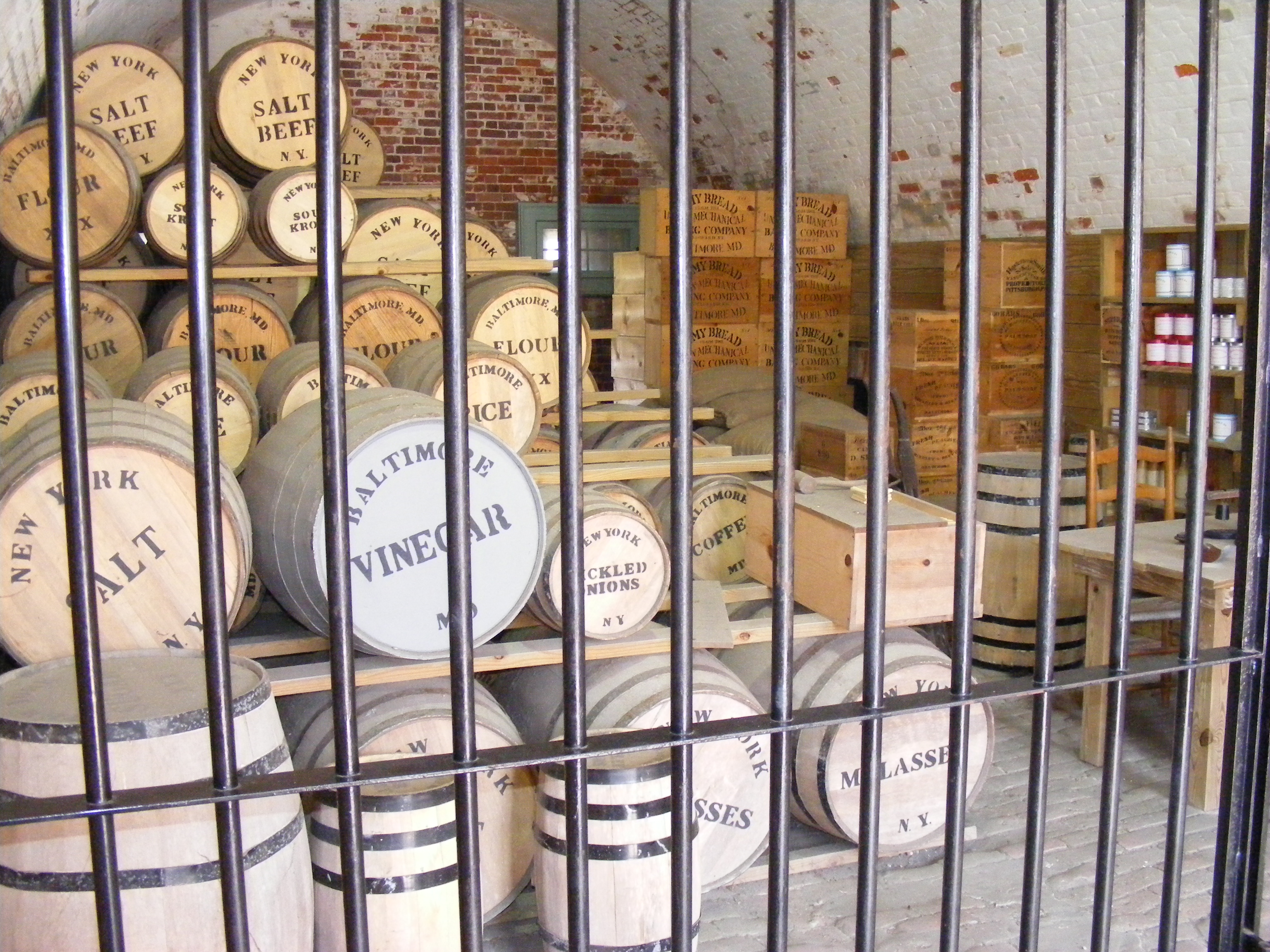
Re-creation of a ration storage room at Fort Macon State Park, NC.

Foods of the American Civil War were the provisions during the American Civil War with which both the Union and Confederate armies struggled to keep their soldiers provisioned adequately.

== Northern rations ==
According to the Revised United States Army Regulations of 1861, the daily rations for an enlisted Union soldier included:

- 12 ounces of pork or bacon; or 1 pound 4 ounces of fresh or salt beef
- 1 pound 6 ounces of soft bread or flour; or 1 pound 4 ounces of cornmeal; or 1 pound of hard bread (hardtack).

These were supplemented per 100 rations with:

- 15 pounds of beans or peas
- 10 pounds of rice or hominy
- 10 pounds of green coffee; or 8 pounds of roasted (or roasted and ground) coffee beans; or 1 pound 8 ounces of tea
- 15 pounds of sugar
- 4 quarts of vinegar
- 1 pound 4 ounces of adamantine or star candles
- 4 pounds of soap
- 3 pounds 12 ounces of salt
- 4 ounces of pepper
- 30 pounds of potatoes
- 1 quart of molasses

The fresh potatoes, beans, peas, rice or hominy could be substituted with desiccated compressed potatoes or mixed vegetables. In 1862 the ration was increased with more dried vegetables. When on the march, the "short" ration consisted of 1 pound of hardtack, 3/4 pound of salt pork or 1/4 pound of fresh meat, 1 ounce of coffee, 3 ounces of sugar, and salt. Soldiers were issued three to eight marching rations which were carried in their haversack or by their unit's baggage train.

Gail Borden's invention of condensed milk was very helpful for the Union army. Soldiers would also regularly drink coffee, however it was not always entirely coffee beans. Dandelion root served as a supplement or ersatz good when coffee beans were scarce. Dandelion root was widely available and caffeine-free, tasting about the same as coffee.

== Southern rations ==
The official ration for soldiers of the Confederate States army was supposed to be similar as that for the Union, with slightly less meat, coffee, vinegar, and salt but more sugar. In practice the ration was rarely issued in full and Confederate soldiers were often required to live off the land; during the Maryland campaign Confederate soldiers subsisted largely off of green corn and apples picked from the fields. Cornbread was a staple of their daily diet, although it was considered coarse, dry and largely tasteless to such extent that they appreciated hardtack captured from Union forces. The peanut, while popular among both sides of the conflict, was often the only thing left to eat in the last years of the war as the Union blockade took hold. Coffee in particular was sorely missed by Confederate soldiers, who often made do without or used a substitute. While a variety of materials were tried – including corn kernels, dried apples, and acorns – the best equivalent was found to be wild chicory root. Whenever possible, Confederates on picket duty would trade scarce Southern tobacco for coffee with their Union counterparts.

== Logistics ==
The Civil War required complex logistics in order to feed the massive numbers of soldiers in the Union and Confederate armies. The task could fall to the respective national governments or on the individual states that recruited, raised, and equipped the regiments and batteries.

=== Union Army ===
In the Union Army, the Subsistence Department was in charge of the purchase, storage and distribution of food rations and related items. It was headed by the Commissary General of Subsistence, who answered directly to the Secretary of War. At the start of the war this was George Gibson but he died shortly thereafter in September 1861. He was succeeded by Joseph Pannell Taylor who served until his own death in June 1864, whereupon Amos Beebe Eaton served through the end of the war.

Like the other supply departments during the war, the Subsistence Department operated independently and with little centralized coordination during the war, although as the Quartermaster Department was responsible for transporting all supplies there was necessarily cooperation between the two. The Subsistence Department maintained depots in major cities and producing areas; officers in charge at these locations were responsible for buying food in bulk and repackaging for delivery to field units. Beef cattle were contracted for delivery at specific points and herds were driven behind armies in the field.

Field units were assigned commissary personnel to oversee the requisition, accounting for and distribution of rations to their respective units. Each regiment was assigned a lieutenant as a regimental quartermaster/commissary and a commissary sergeant, although in Volunteer cavalry regiments the quartermaster/commissary role was split between two lieutenants; each brigade was assigned a captain as assistant commissary of subsistence; each division had a commissary of subsistence as part of the commander's staff, although the role was not legally authorized until 3 March 1865 with a temporary rank of major; each corps was authorized a lieutenant colonel as Chief Commissary of Subsistence following the Militia Act of 1862; and each field army was authorized a colonel as Chief Commissary of Subsistence in 1865. Unit commissary officers requisitioned rations, which were picked up by the unit's wagon train from the nearest subsistence depot or railhead and delivered to the troops.

At the regimental level and lower, commissary personal were selected from within the unit, while staff positions at higher formations were in theory filled by officers from the Subsistence Department. There were not enough Regular officers to fulfil these positions however, so Volunteer officers were appointed to the role: by April 1865 there were 535 commissaries of subsistence of Volunteers, bringing the total number within the Department to 564. Even still, manpower shortages often required staff officers to take on multiple roles or line officers to act in their place; otherwise the positions were left empty.

Additionally, beyond the commissary sergeant, no other enlisted personnel were assigned specifically help commissary officers keep their units fed. Civilian clerks and laborers were hired to work at the main office in Washington and at the depots set up across the country. In the field, units either hired civilian workers or reassigned line soldiers to carry out these tasks. Civilians were often unreliable however, while reassigning soldiers to non-combat duty decreased the fighting power on their units. One alternative source of workers was the country's African American population, in particular the large number of "contraband" or freed slaves. Many Black workers proved to be more reliable and did a better job than their white counterparts.

=== Confederate Army ===
The Confederate army had a similar Commissary General of Subsistence, who for most of the war was Col. Lucius B. Northrop. However, the lack of coordination, plus infighting, created a situation that was worse in the Southern bureau system than in the North. It was further hampered by having to be created from scratch with a serious lack of experienced personnel. Likewise a lack of assigned support personnel required the use of hired civilians, reassigned soldiers or the requisition of slaves to distribute rations to the soldiers. While the use of slave labor was often necessary, it was considered onerous (to the slaveowner), and the reassignment of these workers from other essential chores negatively affected overall economic activity in the South.

The Confederate Army's food situation was sufficiently dire that the potential to capture Union food supplies was a key consideration for Southern generals, especially when planning raids and other offensive action. Confederate generals also had to contend with their own hungry soldiers seizing enemy foodstuffs on their own volition whenever they had the opportunity, which on several occasions distracted from or disrupted more pressing and/or time-sensitive battlefield objectives. Moreover, the long-term strategic value of capturing meat in particular, including most famously the capture of thousands of cattle in the Beefsteak Raid of September 1864, was undermined by the Confederate Army's inability to secure either the hay or grain needed to feed large herds of swine or cattle or the salt needed to preserve meat after slaughter.

== Food preparation and nutrition ==
When issued in full the standard ration, while filling, was deficient by modern nutritional standards. In order to prevent scurvy small quantities of onions, dried apples or peaches, pickles or sauerkraut were sometimes issued. It was often necessary for soldiers to supplement their diets on their own. Soldiers could obtain a greater variety of foods by foraging and/or raiding; receiving food packages from their families; or purchasing from sutlers.

However once the rations were delivered, there were no trained cooks assigned to prepare food for the troops. Soldiers were responsible for their own cooking, whether in small "mess" groups or with each company assigning soldiers to mess duty. As was often the case, improper food preparation was a major factor in disease and discomfort among the soldiers.

The US Congress partially addressed this issue with the Act of March 3, 1863, which mandated one to two "head-cooks" per company and the enlistment of two African-American "under-cooks" per head-cook. Head-cooks were chosen from among the company's soldiers and rotated on a ten-day basis, allowing for each man to learn the role while avoiding the more frequent changeover which had caused issues early in the war. The under-cooks meanwhile were enlisted on a permanent basis, ensuring the food was properly cooked in a consistent manner. Their pay was $10 per month (minus $3 for clothing) plus one daily ration.

One common dish prepared by Civil War soldiers was Skillygalee, hardtack soaked in water and fried in fat. The Confederate army would fry bacon and add in some water with cornmeal to make "coosh," often prepared when the army would have little time to make meals during marches.

Food often became infested with insects, especially rice or grain weevils. When soft bread was so infected, soldiers often had little recourse. However one trick with hardtack was to break it apart in a pot of coffee, drowning any infesting weevils and skimming their bodies off the top.

Beyond the battlefield, the scarcity of food was felt far more sharply in the South, a result of the success of Union blockades. Northern cookbooks of the period barely make mention of the war. In the few Southern cookbooks published during and shortly after, the fact of shortages is inescapable.

== See also ==
- History of military nutrition in the United States
- List of military food topics
