= United States Army Research Institute of Environmental Medicine =

U.S. Army Research Institute of Environmental Medicine
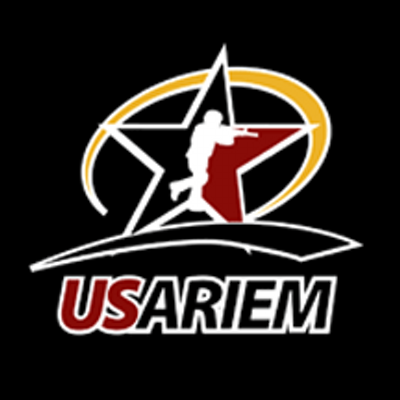
- The USARIEM logo
- Active: 1961–present
- Country: United States of America
- Branch: United States Army
- Type: Medical R&D Command
- Role: Military medical research and development
- Garrison/HQ: U.S. Army Soldier Systems Center, Natick, Massachusetts, US

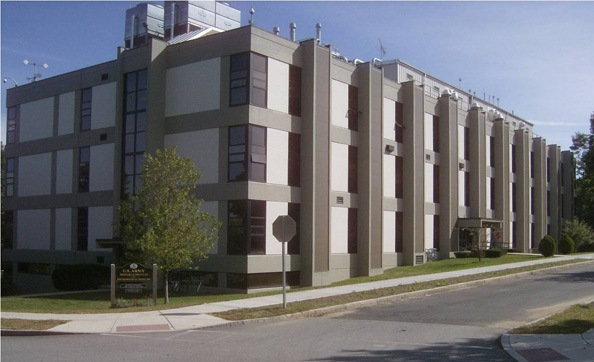
The U.S. Army Research Institute of Environmental Medicine, Natick, Massachusetts, USA.

The U.S. Army Research Institute of Environmental Medicine (USARIEM) is the U.S Army’s main institution and facility for military environmental medicine and exercise physiology research. It is located at Natick, Massachusetts, within the U.S. Army Soldier Systems Center (SSC) installation, but is a subordinate lab of the U.S. Army Medical Research and Materiel Command (USAMRMC), headquartered at Fort Detrick, Maryland, U.S.

== Mission ==
USARIEM’s Mission Statement mandates that the Institute:

Provide solutions to enhance Warfighter health and performance through medical research.

The institute has four divisions, each relating to military human performance as it relates to the environment — Biophysical and Biomedical Modeling, Military Nutrition, Military Performance, and Thermal and Mountain Medicine. Research in the divisions focuses on three elements: the servicemember (acclimation; body size; gender; race; age; health; hydration; nutrition; fitness; and sleep status), the environment (temperature; wind; humidity; and altitude), and the mission (work — intensity, duration, and type; clothing and equipment; and medications).

Research on the effect of environmental pollutants on military personnel is not part of USARIEM's mission, but is within the purview of the U.S. Army Center for Environmental Health Research at Fort Detrick, Maryland.

== History ==
USARIEM traces its institutional lineage back to 1927 and the Harvard Fatigue Laboratory. That facility fostered two institutions that ultimately merged. The first was the Climatic Research Laboratory in Lawrence, MA (1943–54), which relocated to Natick in 1954 under the new name of the Environmental Protection Research Division (EPRD) of the U.S. Army’s Quartermaster Research and Engineering Command. The second was the Armored Medical Research Laboratory (AMRL) at Fort Knox, KY (1942–61) elements of which joined with the EPRD in 1961 to constitute the present USARIEM facility and organization.

== Products and capabilities ==
USARIEM’s basic and applied research capabilities are focused upon biomedical evaluations, health hazard assessments, countermeasures development and a rapid response to a diverse range of environmental threats and problems. Products include individual soldier equipment and rations; guidelines pertaining to training policy and preventive medicine; and performance monitoring strategies and predictive algorithms.

== Research Divisions ==
Research divisions within USARIEM consist of Biophysics and Biomedical Modeling (which develops wearable biosensors and biomedical models to simulate effects of heat, cold, high altitude, hydration, nutritional status and clothing systems and equipment)[], Military Performance (which researches performance enhancements [physical, cognitive, behavioral, psychomotor] in military occupational tasks), Military Nutrition (which researches nutritional issues, including new rations, affecting service members), and Thermal and Mountain Medicine (which researches physical and cognitive work capabilities and medical problems associated with military operations at high terrestrial altitude or temperature extremes).

== Facilities ==
USARIEM maintains several unique or highly specialized facilities:

- Hypobaric Chamber Facility or HCF (altitude chambers)
  - Two Class D chambers (man-rated) rarefied air atmosphere, non-oxygen enriched
    - Large Study Chamber: internal volume of 2000 cu. ft. (floor area 200 sq. ft.)
    - Small Study Chamber: internal volume of 1100 cu. ft. (floor area 108 sq. ft.)
  - Environmentally controlled (altitude, temperature, humidity) & connected by an airlock
    - Simulates altitudes of 800-225 Torr (sea level to 9000 m)
    - Temperatures from -32 °C to 43 °C
    - Relative humidity (Rh) between 20-80% (dew point dependent)
  - 23,656 simulated altitude exposures of human volunteers over 33 years of studies
- 13 Environmental Chambers
  - Temperatures from -10 °C to 50 °C
- 5 Biophysical Evaluation Chambers
  - Temperatures from -10 °C to 50 °C
- Biomechanics Laboratory
- Water Immersion Laboratory
  - Temperatures from 5 °C to 45 °C
- Human Exercise Physiology Laboratory
- Human/Animal Physiology Laboratory
- Psychology Laboratory
- Electron Microscopy Laboratory
- Animal Housing and Care Facility
  - Association for Assessment and Accreditation of Laboratory Animal Care International (AAALAC) Accredited
- Doriot Climatic Chamber Complex
  - Temperatures from -57 °C to 74 °C
- Laser and Flow Cytometry

Off site:

- United States Army Pike’s Peak Research Laboratory
  - Located in Colorado at 4,300 m

== List of USARIEM commanders ==
Number	Tenure	Commander
1	1961–1962	CPT Robert J. T. Joy, MD
2	1962–1965	LTC William H. Hall, MD
3	1965–1971	COL James E. Hansen, MD
4	1971–1976	COL LeeRoy G. Jones, MD
5	1976–1980	COL Harry G. Dangerfield, MD
6	1980–1982	COL Eliot J. Pearlman, MD
7	1982–1984	COL Ernest M. Irons Jr., MD
8	1984–1986	COL Brendon E. Joyce, MD
9	1986–1989	COL David D. Schnakenberg, PhD
10	1989–1990	COL Joseph C. Denniston, DVM
11	1990–1994	COL Gerald P. Krueger, PhD
12	1994–1997	COL Joel T. Hiatt, MS
13	1997–2000	COL David M. Penetar, PhD
14	2000–2003	COL John P. Obusek, PT, PhD
15	2003–2006	COL Karl E. Friedl, PhD
16	2006-2008	COL Beau J. Freund, PhD
17	2008-2010	COL Kevin Keenan, M.D., M.P.H.
18	2010-2012	COL Gaston P. Bathalon, RD, PhD
19	2012–2014	COL Deborah L. Whitmer, D.V.M.
20	2014-2016	COL Thomas G. Eccles III, M.D.
21	2016–2018	COL Raymond Phua, tDPT
22	2018–2020	COL Sean S. O'Neil, PhD
23	2020-2022	COL Troy Morton, D.P.M.
24	2022–present	COL Michael I. Cohen, DO

== See also ==
- History of military nutrition in the United States
