= Nalini Nadkarni =

American ecologist

Nalini Moreshwar Nadkarni
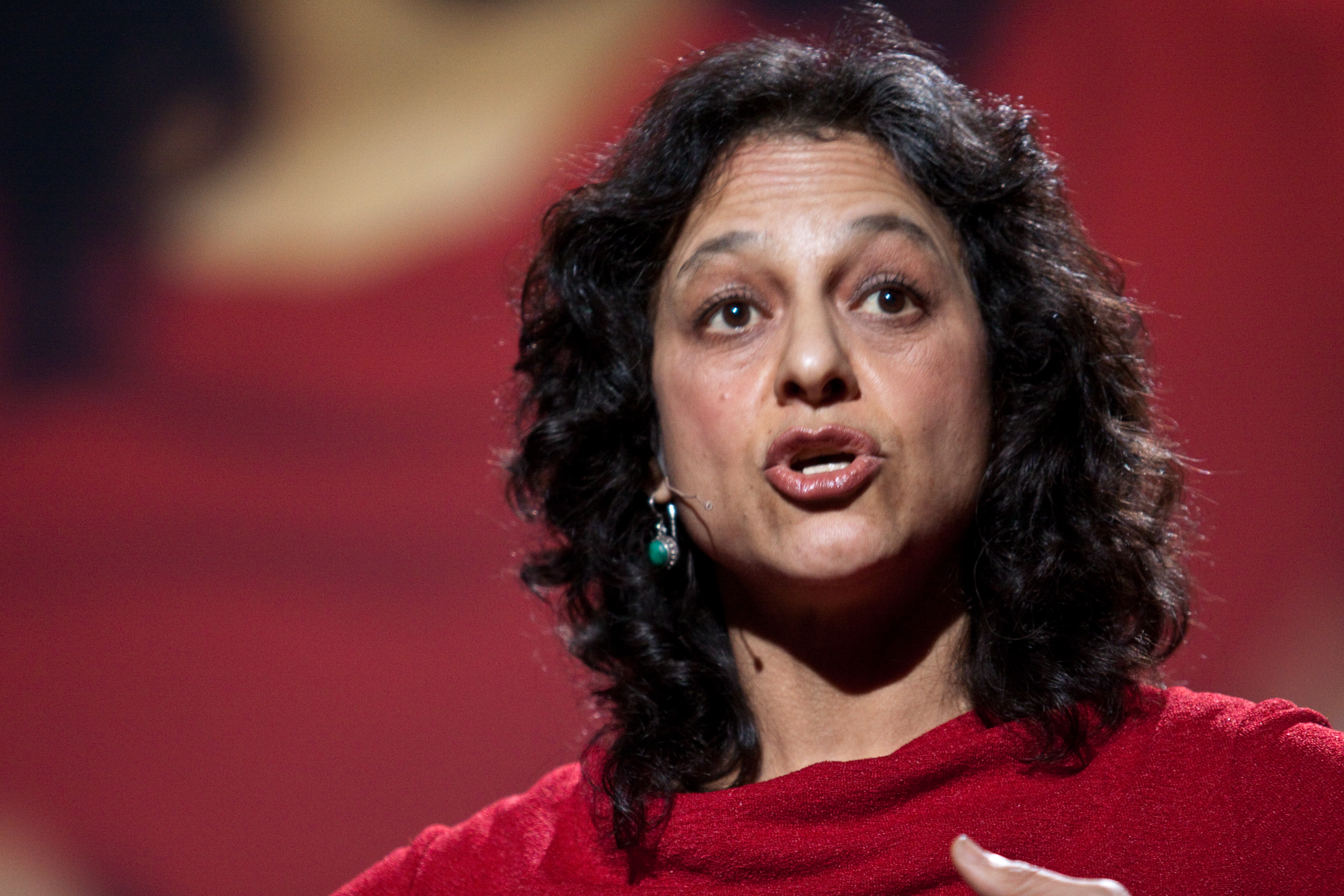
- Nadkarni in 2009
- Born: October 13, 1954 (age 72); Bethesda, Maryland, US
- Education: Brown University (BS), University of Washington (PhD)
- Occupation: Forest ecologist

Nalini Nadkarni (born October 13, 1954) is an American forest ecologist who pioneered the study of Costa Rican rain forest canopies. Using mountain climbing equipment to make her ascent, Nadkarni first took an inventory of the canopy in 1981, followed by two more inventories in 1984.

== First years ==
Nadkarni was born in Bethesda, Maryland on October 13, 1954, where she grew up. Her father was Hindu, and her mother was orthodox Jewish.

== Career ==
Nadkarni's interest was first drawn to rainforest ecology due to the contradiction offered by its plant life. There was a great abundance and variety of plant life within the rain forest despite its nutrient poor soil, and her goal was to discover how the plant life was sustained. Her studies within the canopy revealed that the epiphytes, which are non-parasitic plants such as orchids and ferns that live on the branches and trunks of other plants, were trapping organic material beneath their root system. This organic material eventually formed a nutrient rich mat, and trees in the rain forest had developed aerial roots, stemming from their trunks and branches, in order to absorb these nutrients as well. The aerial roots growing into the mats aided the rain forest trees by providing the nourishment that they did not receive from the nutrient poor soil.

Nadkarni and her work in the Costa Rican rain forest were featured in the 1988 PBS series, The Second Voyage of the Mimi, starring a young Ben Affleck. She maintains an interest in public outreach, and her work was highlighted on the web page of the National Science Foundation. She is the author of Between Earth and Sky: Our Intimate Connections to Trees and has delivered TED Talks on Conserving the Canopy and Life Science in Prison. She also wrote some text (foreword and quotes) for a book for young explorers entitled, Kingfisher Voyages: Rain Forest, published in 2006. Her work has included developing moss growing techniques with prisoners, as well as bringing artists, like musician and biologist Duke G. Brady, into the forest canopy to write and perform.

She is a professor emerita of the School of Biological Sciences at the University of Utah.

In November 2019, Mattel introduced a new Barbie doll, based on Nadkarni and called "Explorer Barbie".

== Personal life ==
Nadkarni attended Brown University for her undergraduate degree, where she double majored in biology and modern dance. After graduation, she worked as a field biologist in Papua New Guinea, and then moved to Paris to practice with a dance troupe there. Having tried out both career paths, she made the decision to focus on biology and entered the University of Washington, where she earned her Ph.D. She has written over 140 scientific papers in 42 peer-reviewed journals, including Science, Nature, Ecology, Oecologia, Ecopsychology, and Frontiers in Ecology and the Environment. Her scientific honors include the AAAS Award for Public Engagement, the National Science Foundation Public Service Award, the Archie Carr Medal for Conservation, and the William Julius Wilson Award for Achievement in Social Justice. She has given invited and endowed public lectures and keynote presentations around the world.

She was a faculty member at The Evergreen State College for 20 years, and in 2011, joined the University of Utah as a professor of Biology and Director of the Center for Science and Mathematics Education.

She is married to myrmecologist Jack Longino, who is also a professor at the University of Utah. They have two children, August and Rikki.

== Community work ==
Nadkarni is deeply committed to public engagement with science. In 1994, she co-founded the International Canopy Network, a non-profit organization that fosters communication among researchers, educators, and conservationists concerned with forest canopies.

“Part of the scientific enterprise is to disseminate the results of research to other scientists as well as to people outside of academia. However, scientists often receive little training or reward for presenting their results to non-scientists. When they do, most scientists tend to disseminate their information to ‘environmentally aware’ non-scientists via the media or traditional informal science education institutions such as museums and botanical gardens, which are less frequently visited by non-traditional audiences. In 2001, she received a Guggenheim Fellowship to explore the obstacles that scientists face in disseminating their research to non-scientific audiences. Her approach is to directly link my research and conservation messages about forest canopies with activities and objects valued by non-traditional audiences. She has designed and implemented projects to raise awareness and inspire these audiences to learn and care more about science, trees, and nature in general.” -Nalini Nadkarni

She has given two TED talks (Conserving the Canopy and Life Science in Prison) and over 25 endowed lectures around the world.

Dr. Nadkarni's approach to "tapestry thinking" aims to converge different ways of thinking among communities to find common ground.

Her work has been featured in Natural History, Glamour, Playboy, and others, and she has appeared in many television documentaries, including Bill Nye the Science Guy, Good Morning America, National Geographic, and CNN's The Next List.

Nadkarni has pioneered bringing science education, conservation projects, and nature imagery to the incarcerated. In 2003, she co-created the Sustainability in Prison Program in Washington State, and in 2011, created the Initiative to bring Science Programs to the Incarcerated (INSPIRE). These programs bring multiple benefits for inmates, scientists, correctional institutions, and the community.

== Publications ==
Nadkarni has written and published two scholarly books (Forest Canopies and Monteverde: Ecology and Conservation of a Tropical Cloud Forest). She has written a popular book on the relationships between trees and people: Between the Earth and Sky published in 2002. Between the Earth and Sky details her research and findings on trees. Her second book was Voyages: Rain Forest, which was a picture book for children that she wrote with Jinny Johnson in 2006.

== Honors and awards ==
Nadkarni has gained many honors and awards.

- John Simon Guggenheim Fellowship, 2001
- Aldo Leopold Leadership Fellowship, 2004
- University of Miami's Distinguished Visiting Professor Award
- J. Sterling Morton Award from the National Arbor Day Foundation
- Grace Hopper Lifetime Achievement Award
- Public Service Award from the National Science Board, 2010
- AAAS Public Engagement With Science Award, 2011
- Monito del Giardino Prize for Environmental Action, 2012
- Honorary Doctorate of Science from Brown University, 2014
- Time Magazine's Best Inventions of 2014: Blue Room, the prison room that helps inmates relax
- Washington State University, William Julius Wilson Award for the Advancement of Social Justice, 2015
- Elected Fellow of the Ecological Society of America, 2016
- Wings Worldquest, Women of Discovery Awards 2018

== Eponymous species ==
- Procryptocerus nalini Longino & Snelling 2002 - Gliding ant
- Porina nadkarniae Lücking & Merwin 2008 - Epiphytic lichen
