= Peter G. Marston =

American actor (1935–2022)

Peter G. Marston (February 13, 1935 – September 30, 2022) was an American scientist, businessman, actor, and musician. He was chief executive officer of Cambridge Environmental Technology and held a visiting professorship at the Massachusetts Institute of Technology, in the Plasma Science and Fusion Center. Marston also was a member of the Moscow-based International Academy of Electrotechnical Sciences.

== Government service ==
Marston once was head of the United States Department of Energy's National Program for Magnetohydrodynamics and High Energy Physics Technology.

== Television ==
In the early 1980s, Marston became known to American television audiences through his portrayal of Captain Clement Tyler Granville in The Voyage of the Mimi. He also starred in the sequel series The Second Voyage of the Mimi, where a young Ben Affleck portrayed his character's grandson.

== Personal life ==
Marston was born in Boston, Massachusetts and was a graduate of the Massachusetts Maritime Academy. At the time of his death, Marston lived in Ipswich, Massachusetts.
