= Train (military) =

Collection of military transport

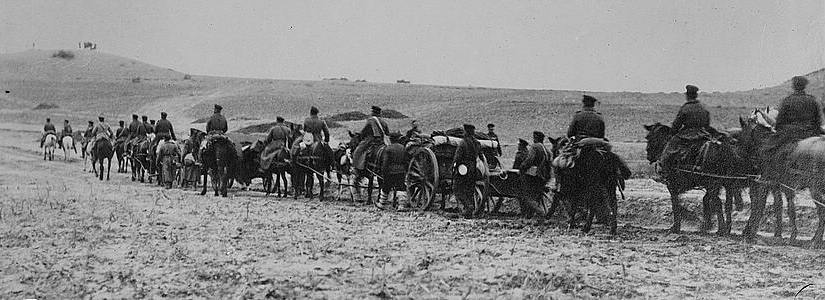
Siege train arriving before Adrianople, Nov. 3, 1912

In military contexts, a train is the logistical transport elements accompanying a military force. Often called a supply train or baggage train, it has the job of providing materiel for their associated combat forces when in the field. When focused on provision of field artillery and its ammunition, it may be termed an artillery train. For sieges, the addition of siege engines to an artillery train was called a siege train. These military terms predate and do not imply a railway train, though railways are often employed for modern logistics and can include armoured trains.

For armies, this historically usually referred to forces employing wagons, horses, mules, oxen, camels, or even elephants. These can still be useful where difficult weather or topography limit use of railways, trucks, sealift, or airlift.

The United States Department of Defense Dictionary of Military and Associated Terms defined the term "train" as:

A service force or group of service elements that provides logistic support, e.g., an organization of naval auxiliary ships or merchant ships or merchant ships attached to a fleet for this purpose; similarly, the vehicles and operating personnel that furnish supply, evacuation, and maintenance services to a land unit.

== History ==
=== Antiquity ===
In the Ancient Macedonian army, restrictions were placed on the size and composition of the baggage train by Philip II of Macedon and his son Alexander the Great. Carts were generally forbidden – with the exception of carrying essential items such as siege engines, tents, plunder or acting as ambulances – because they were considered to impede the army's speed and mobility. Throat-and-girth harnesses of the period would cause choking if too much weight was being pulled, carts were liable to break down, and they could not travel in rough or hilly terrain. Instead, supplies were carried by soldiers, the servants accompanying them, and pack animals. Horses and mules were the primary pack animal in the Macedonian army, each capable of carrying 200 lb (90 kg) (excluding the weight of the pack saddle); after the conquest of Egypt these were supplemented by the use of camels, which could carry 300 lb (140 kg). Neither oxen or ox carts were used as they were slower, had less endurance, and their hooves ill-suited for long distances compared to horses and mules.

The individual Roman legionary carried his possessions and tools on a forked pole across his shoulder when on the march. However tents, equipment and bulk supplies were transported by separate train detachments composed of mules and wagons under the control of camp servants.

=== 18th century ===
==== Russian army ====
In common with most European armies of this period the Russian army relied primarily on the short-term employment of civilian contract drivers to provide transport and supply services. However following reforms in 1760, organised siege train "parks" were raised to furnish wagons and other support for the heavy guns and mortars of siege artillery.

==== American Revolutionary War ====
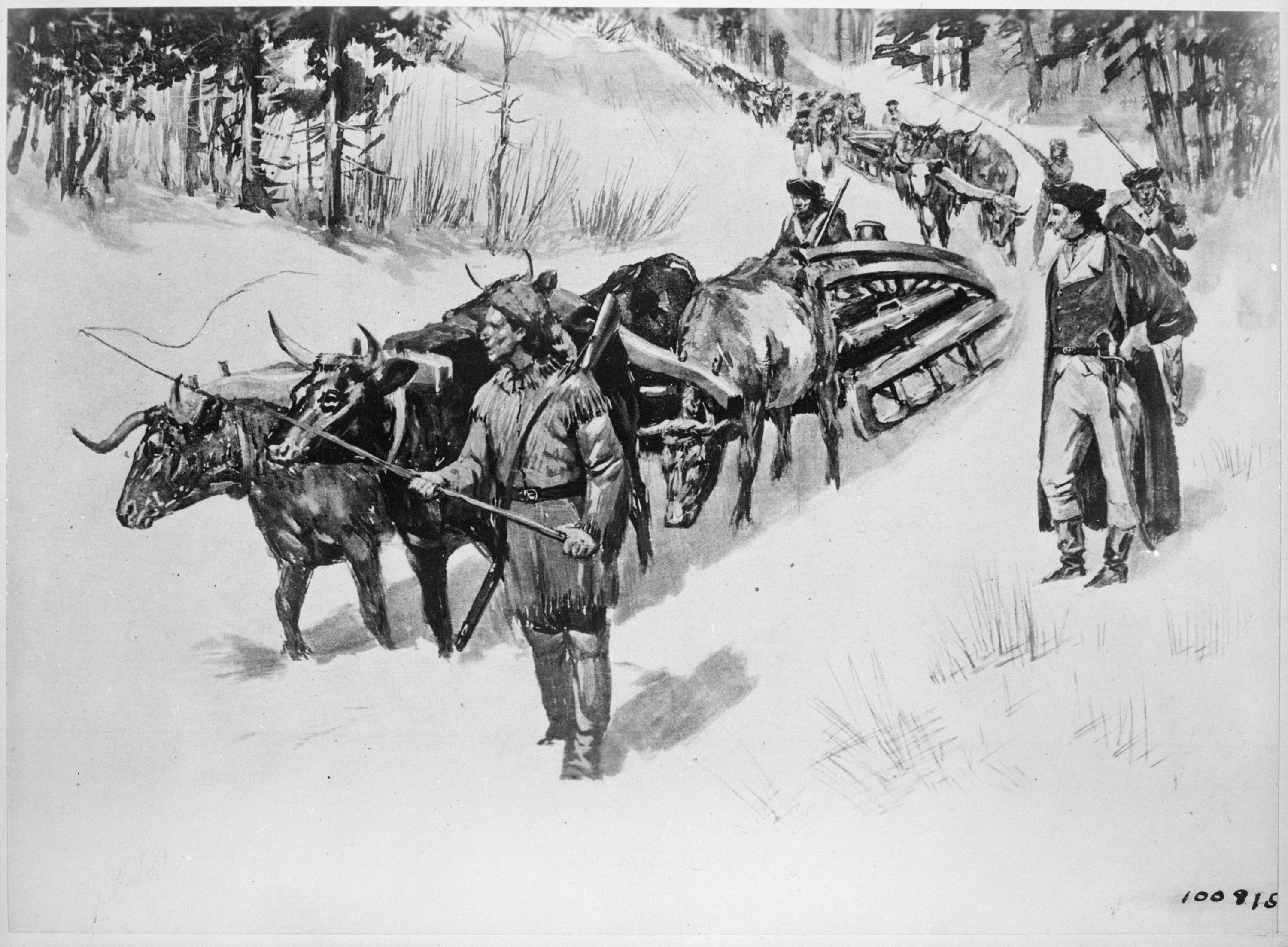
Train for the Siege of Boston, 1775

The Noble train of artillery, also known as the Knox Expedition, has been highlighted as one of the incredible feats of logistics of the American Revolutionary War. From November 17, 1775, to January 25, 1776, Colonel Henry Knox transported 60 tons of artillery and other ordnance from Fort Ticonderoga to the Siege of Boston, a distance of approximately 300 miles (480 km). The arrival of these cannon helped end the siege in an American victory.

Conversely, historian R. Arthur Bowler argues that the failure of General John Burgoyne's Saratoga campaign of 1777 was in particular a result of mismanagement of the baggage train. Although the collection of supplies had begun in January, it was not until early June when the British hurriedly contracted for 400 horses to pull their artillery and 500 two-horse carts with drivers to haul supplies. Although American forces evacuated Fort Ticonderoga on July 6, the wagon train did not start to arrive until mid-July, preventing Burgoyne from making an immediate pursuit. It was early August when Burgoyne finally took possession of Fort Edward on the Hudson River, by which point only 180 of the contracted wagons had arrived. Not until September 13 had sufficient reserves been collected to allow the army to press on, though continued problems with insufficient supplies and horses led to the disastrous Battle of Bennington. Ultimately, Burgoyne erred in assuming he could acquire enough horses and vehicles while moving through hostile territory; diverting too many horses to pulling the army's too-large artillery train; and failing to rein in his officers from appropriating horses and vehicles for personal use.

=== 19th century ===
==== French Army ====
In 1800 a permanent Artillery Train was created, with permanently enlisted and uniformed drivers under military discipline. The success of this corps led to a similar regimental Wagon Train being created by Napoleon in 1806 to provide transport and support services for his Imperial Guard. Wagon Train Battalions were created in 1811 to standardise existing supply arrangements for the army as a whole.

==== British Army ====
Until the mid-nineteenth century the British Army had relied primarily on hired civilian drivers to provide transport services as needed. A Royal Waggon Train had been created in 1802 to ensure logistic support but it had been down-sized after 1815 and disbanded in 1832. The ad-hoc employment of non-disciplined contract workers had clear limitations and during the Crimean War a permanent organisation The Land Transport Corps was created as an integral part of the regular army; to be renamed as The Military Train in 1856 and in 1888 as the Army Service Corps.

==== American Civil War ====
During the American Civil War, both the Union and Confederate armies tried to keep the size of their wagon trains in check to improve the tactical mobility of their forces. This was measured as a ratio of the number of wagons per soldiers, with the idealized number according to Napoleon being of 12.5 wagons per 1,000 soldiers. However, Napoleon benefitted from a densely populated Europe where food was plentiful. In the more sparsely populated South, where armies were more reliant on supply lines, the ratio was between 25 and 35 wagons per 1,000 men (a similar ratio was maintained after the war out on the American frontier). In general, the Confederates managed a lower ratio compared to Union forces, although this was borne out of necessity instead of choice.

A distinction was made between the general supply trains, which carried sustenance, ammunition and forage for the entire force, and an individual unit's baggage train, which carried a ready supply of ammunition, hospital stores, rations, forage and personal effects. While the size of the former varied depending on how many soldiers needed to be supported and was organized by division, restrictions were commonly placed on the latter. For example, prior to the start of the Army of the Potomac's Peninsula campaign, the limit was set at 4 wagons for every army corps headquarters; 3 wagons for every division or brigade headquarters; 6 wagons for every full regiment of infantry; and 3 wagons for every squadron of cavalry or artillery battery. In terms of the general supply train, Rufus Ingalls believed 7 wagons for every 1,000 men was needed to carry rations, forage and other materiel, and another 4 wagons per 1,000 men to carry cartridges.

The standard army wagon in good condition could haul 4,000 lbs of supplies across good roads when pulled by a full team of six mules. However the usual load was 2,400lbs, including forage for the team, or less than 2,000lbs with a 4-mule team. Mules were preferred over horses as they were cheaper, required less forage and had superior endurance. When operating as part of a wagon train, the typical rate of travel was between 12 and 24 miles per day, although the latter was only possible under ideal circumstances and poor conditions could result in much slower travel times. A wagon train could also stretch for many miles: with a 6-mule team and wagon taking up approximately 12 yards of space, a train of 800 wagons moving in single column, at an easy gait and with a normal interval between wagons, occupied 6 to 8 miles of road.

Supply Wagon Ratio during the Civil War
Campaign	per 1,000 Men
Army of the Potomac (1862)	29
Jackson's Valley campaign	7
Army of Northern Virginia (1863)	28
Army of the Potomac (1864)	36
Sherman's March to the Sea	40

== See also ==
- Military supply chain management
- Ammunition train
- Wagon fort
