= Armored Medical Research Laboratory =

U.S. Army medical research facility focusing on issues resulting from armored warfare

The Armored Medical Research Laboratory (AMRL) was a U.S. Army medical research facility maintained at Fort Knox, Kentucky, from 1942 to 1961 to solve environmental problems encountered by soldiers in tanks.

== Mission ==
Ultimately, the mission of the AMRL was expanded to include research on heat acclimation, physical fitness, nutrition, burns and foot disabilities as applied to soldiers.

== Merge ==
Finally, elements of the AMRL merged with the Environmental Protection Research Division (EPRD) of the U.S. Army's Quartermaster Research and Engineering Command in 1961 to constitute what is now the United States Army Research Institute of Environmental Medicine (USARIEM) at Natick, Massachusetts.

== See also ==
- List of former United States Army medical units
