= United States Army Pikes Peak Research Laboratory =

Medical research laboratory in Colorado, United States

Coordinates: 38°50′26″N 105°02′43″W

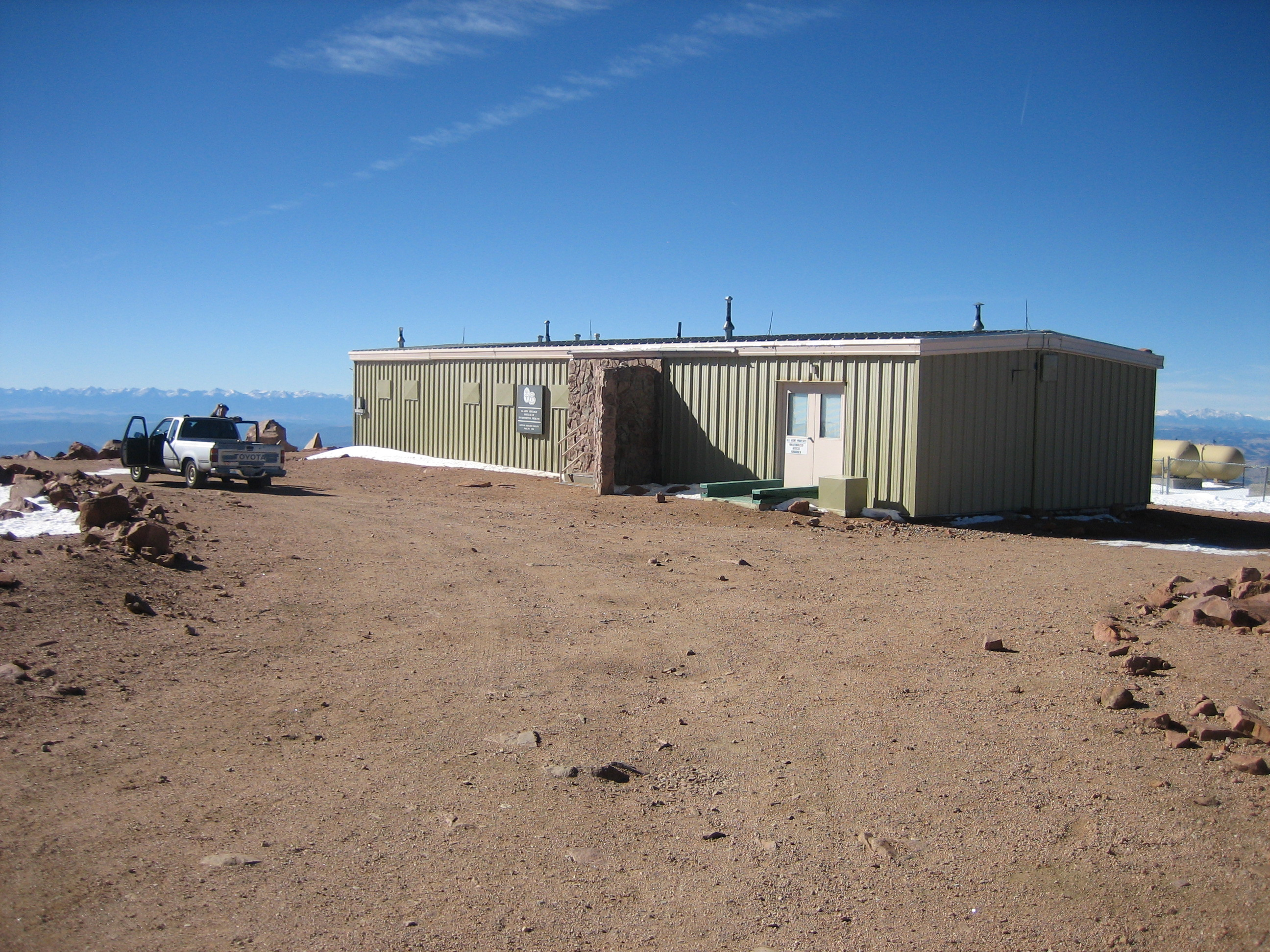
A full view of the lab, on the summit of Pikes Peak

The U.S. Army Pikes Peak Research Laboratory, or simply the "Pikes Peak Lab", is a modern medical research laboratory for the assessment of the impact of high altitude on human physiological and medical parameters of military interest. It is a satellite facility of the U.S. Army Research Institute of Environmental Medicine (USARIEM), located in Natick, Massachusetts. The Pikes Peak Lab is at the summit of Pikes Peak 14,115 feet (4,302 m) in central Colorado, United States. The summit is approximately 5 acres (2.0 ha) of relatively flat, rocky terrain and is directly and easily accessible by automobile via the Pikes Peak Highway.

The lab has been maintained by USARIEM since 1969 and is a building of 2,267 sq ft (210.6 m^{2}). floor space divided into a kitchen and dining/day room, common area bathroom and shower, and common area sleeping quarters accommodating up to 16 research volunteers, a wet laboratory, a research area, and a mechanical room housing steel storage tanks for water and sewage. The building is well insulated and protected from the elements, supplied with electrical power, and heated by natural gas.

Also occupying the summit is the commercially operated lodging, the Summit House, for the 500 to 3000 tourists who come daily to the summit in the summer time by car, cog railway, or trail hiking.

US Forest Service rangers of the Pike National Forest have general administrative oversight of the greater area. The Pikes Peak Lab was renamed the USARIEM Maher Memorial Altitude Laboratory in honor of John T. Maher, Ph.D., director of USARIEM's Altitude Research Division from 1981 to 1983.

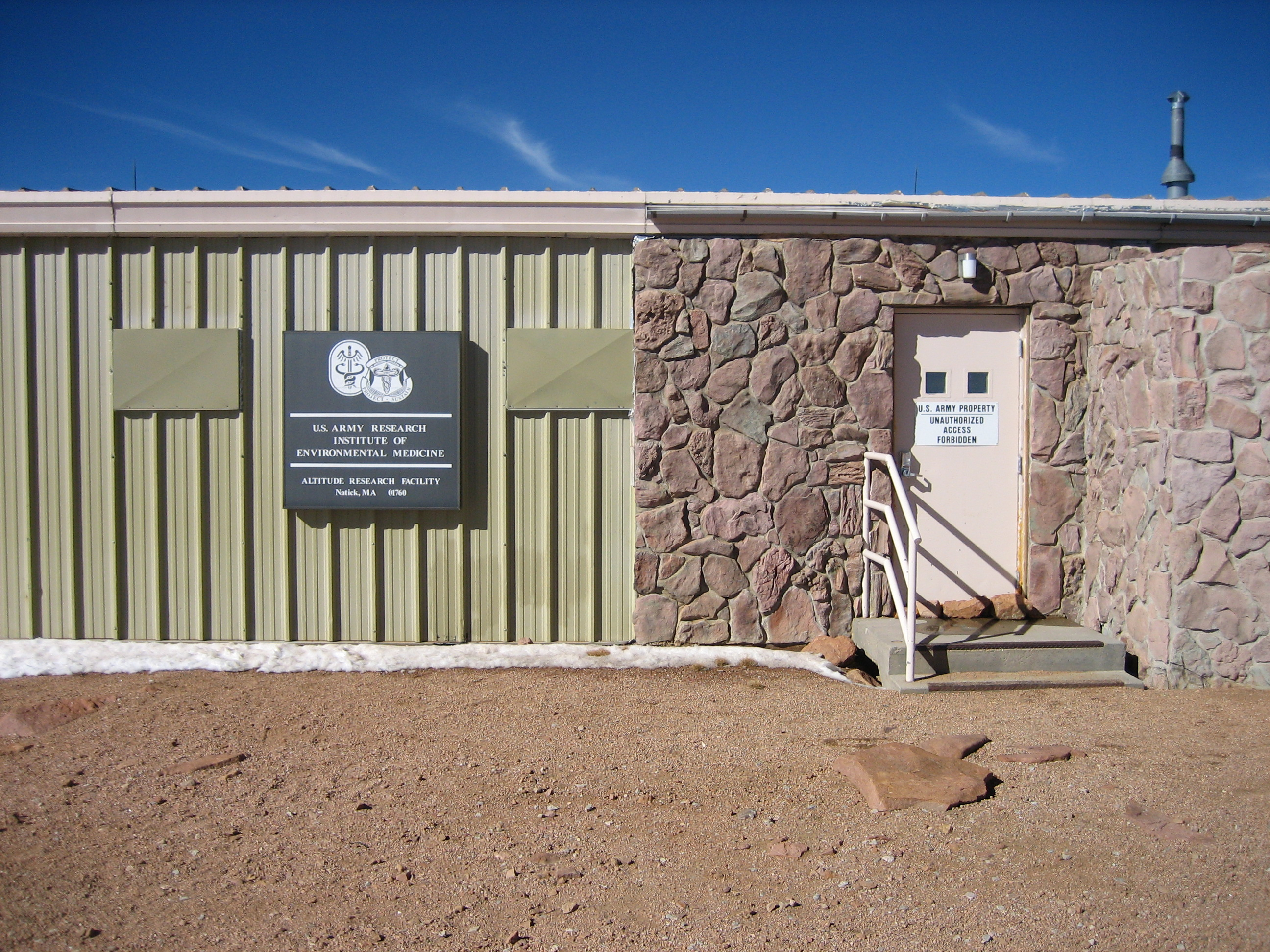
The front door to the Lab

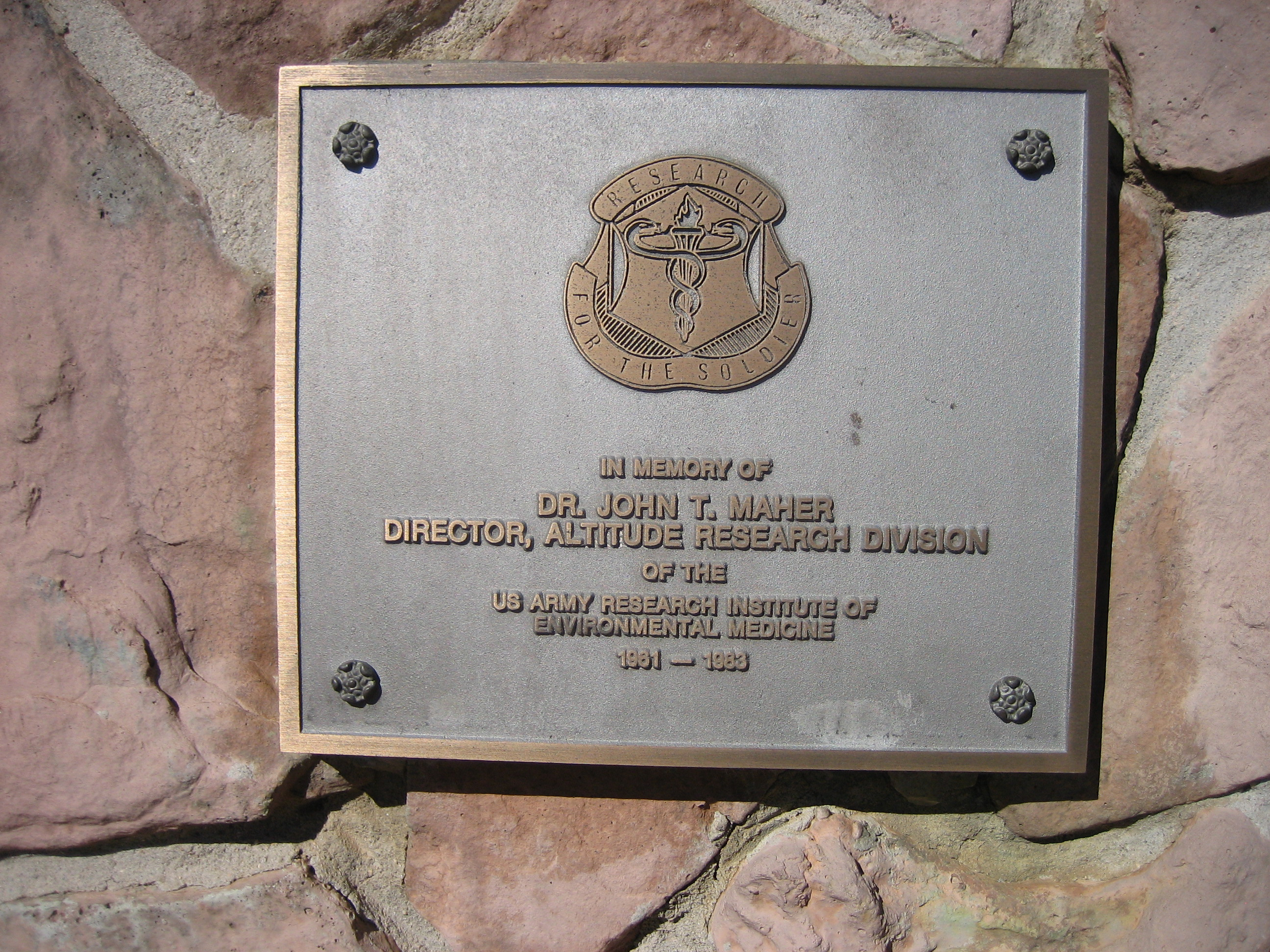
Plaque on the side of the lab
