= Field shower =

Equipment used to provide sanitation and decontamination

A field shower is equipment used to provide sanitation and decontamination facilities to military personnel, equipment and vehicles using various liquids, including water in the field of operations. Usually the showering facility is provided by the combat service support elements or decontamination units to combat units deployed away from permanent properties that offer the facilities, or when combat units have been exposed to hazardous chemicals and need to quickly decontaminate themselves.

== United States Army ==
In the United States Army, the responsibility for deploying field showers lies with the quartermasters. The field shower is also found in the U.S. Army's overseas deployments; for example, a field shower fed by two 2000-litre water blivets was set up in Ramadi, Iraq by the members of the 89th Regimental Chemical Shop.
