= Combat Capabilities Development Command Soldier Center =

United States Army laboratory in Natick, Massachusetts

DEVCOM Soldier Center
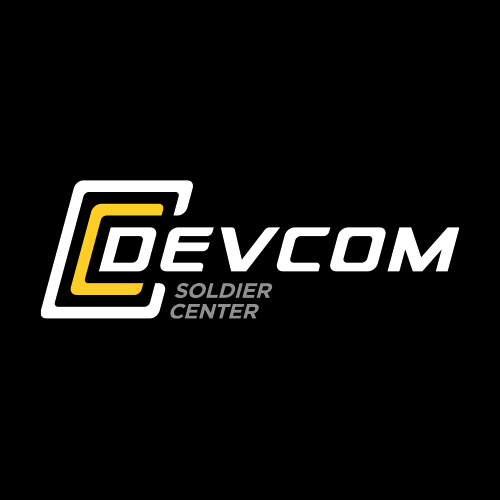
- DEVCOM SC logo
- Active: 1954–present
- Country: United States
- Branch: Army
- Type: Research and development
- Size: 1,017 employees
- Part of: U.S. Army Combat Capabilities Development Command
- Garrison/HQ: Natick, Massachusetts
- Website: DEVCOM Soldier Center official website

Commanders
- Director: Mr. Douglas A. Tamilio
- Deputy Director: Ms. Jaclyn M. Fontecchio

Insignia
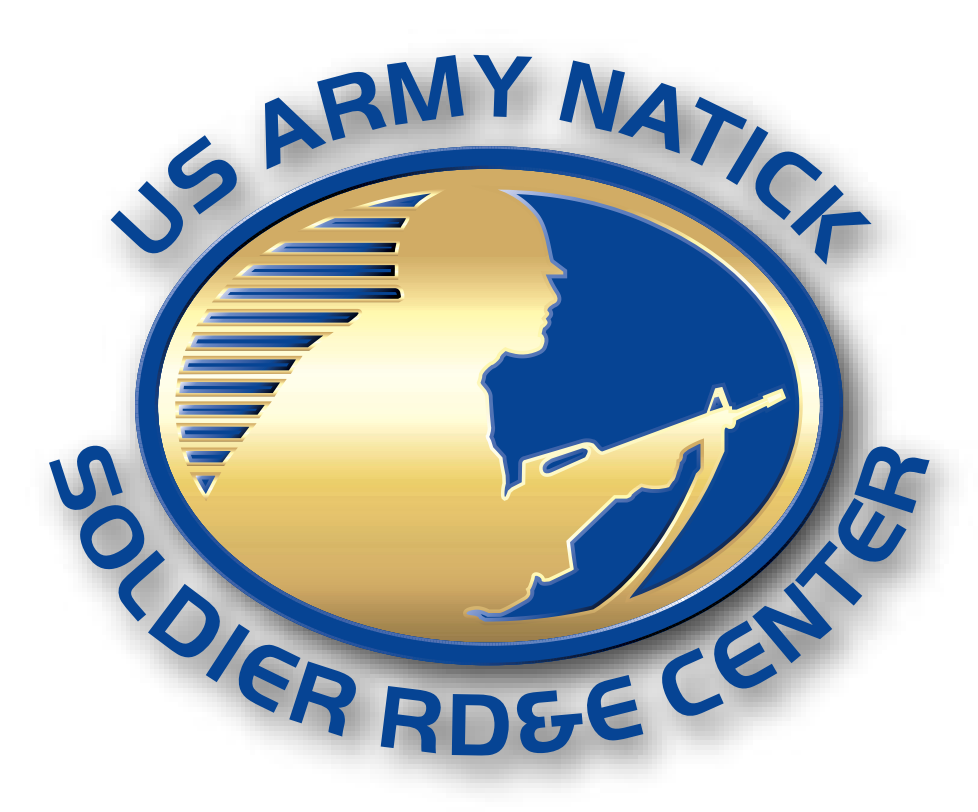
- NSRDEC logo (2007)

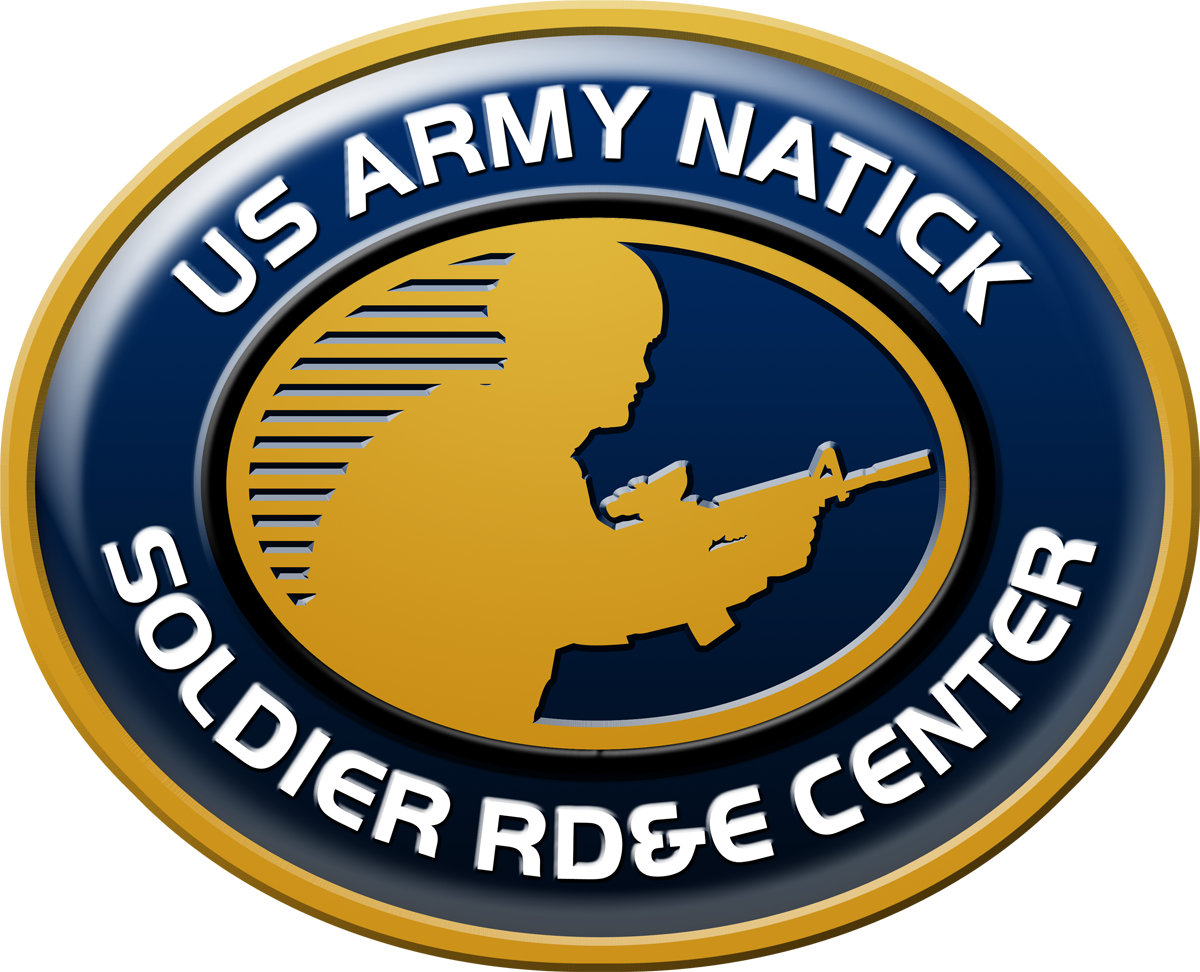
- NSRDEC logo (2014)

The U.S. Army Combat Capabilities Development Command Soldier Center (DEVCOM SC), commonly known as Natick Laboratories, is a military laboratory located in Natick, Massachusetts, tasked with the research and development of food, clothing, shelters, airdrop systems, and other service member support items for the U.S. military. DEVCOM Soldier Center is a tenant of the U.S. Army Natick Soldier Systems Center (NSSC), formerly known as the U.S. Army Soldier Systems Center (SSC). The DEVCOM Soldier Center is a component unit of the U.S. Army Combat Capabilities Development Command (DEVCOM).

== The installation ==
Natick Soldier Systems Center
- Natick, Massachusetts
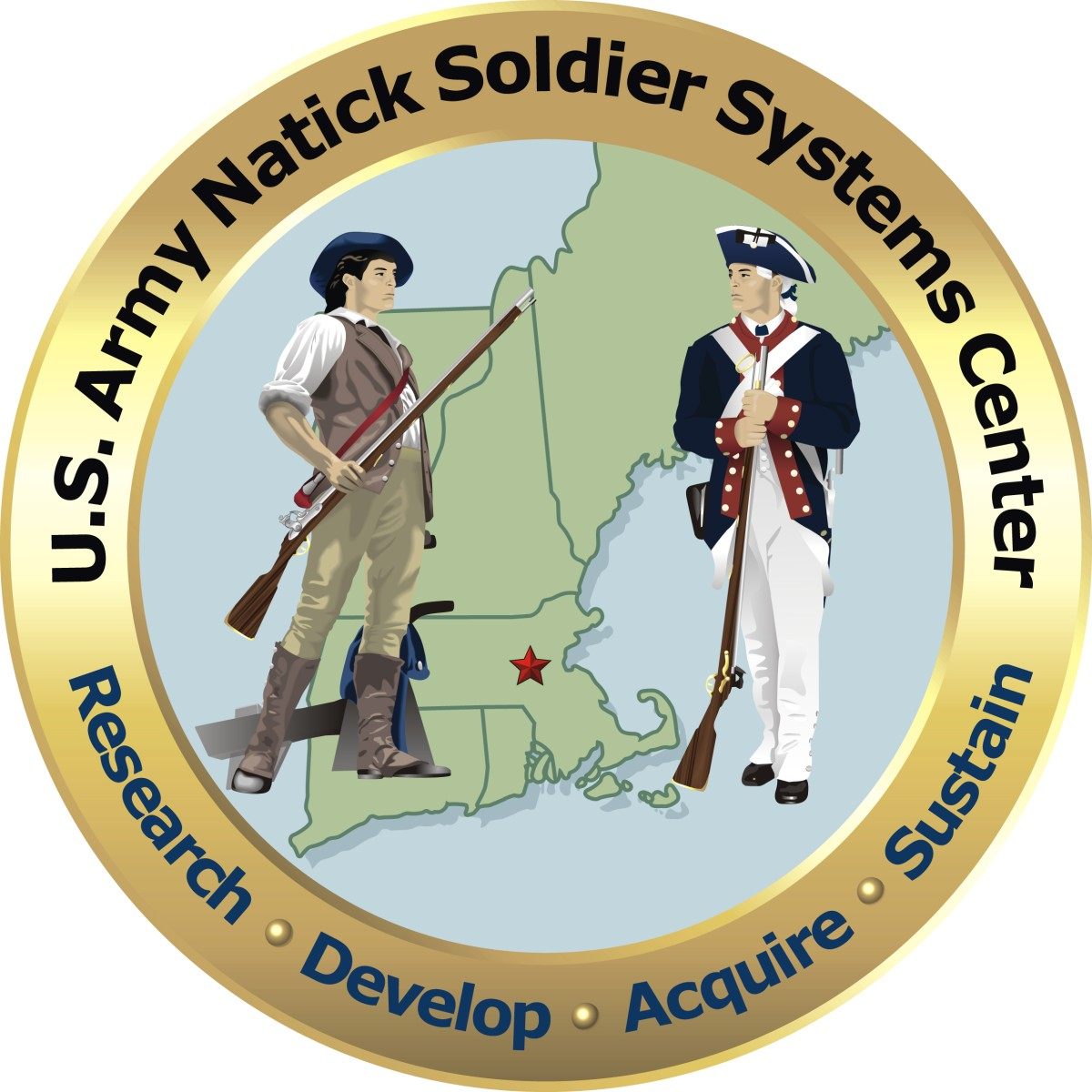
- NSSC emblem

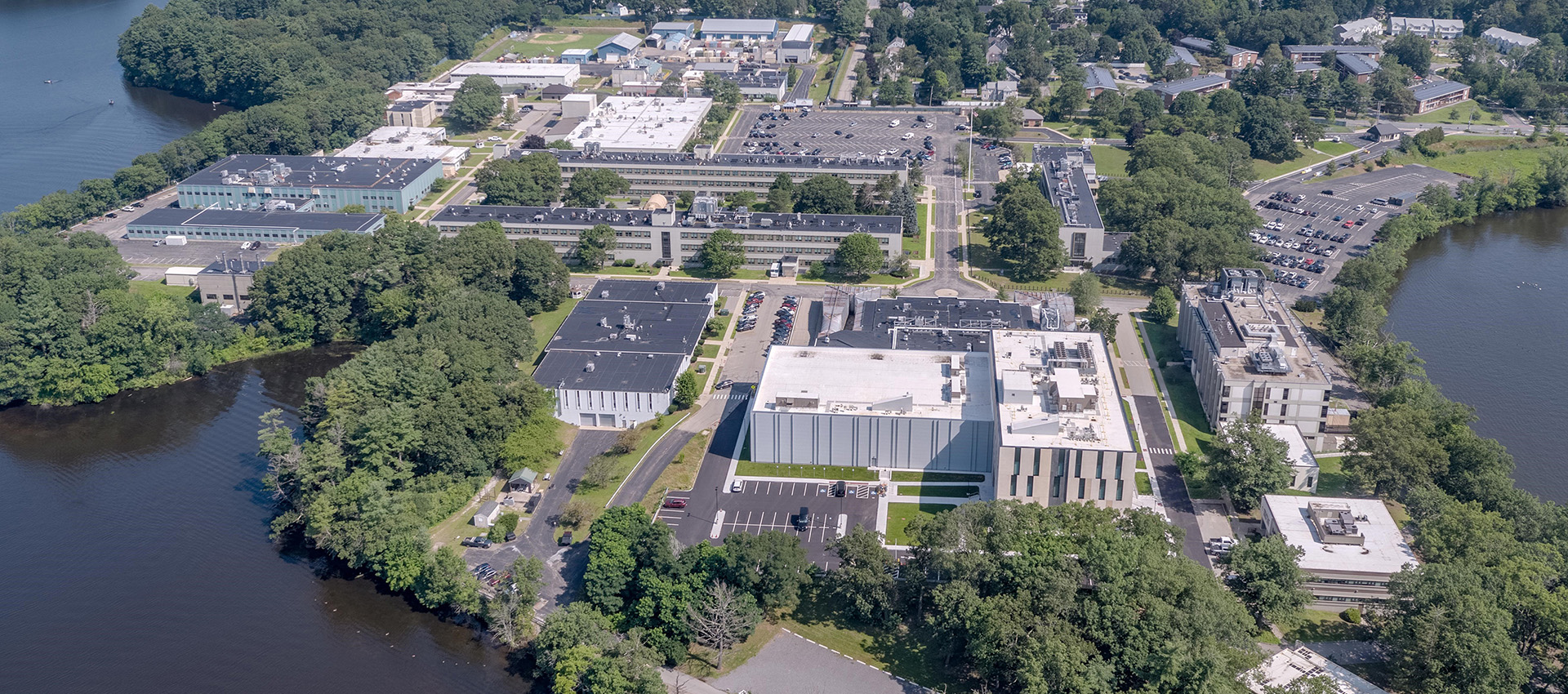
- Natick Soldier Systems Center facilities

Site information
- Type: Research and development
- Owner: United States Army
- Controlled by: U.S. Army Installation Management Command
- Website: Natick Soldier Systems Center official website

Location
- Position in Massachusetts Natick SSC (the United States)
- Coordinates: 42°17′23″N 71°21′43.9128″W

Site history
- Built: 1953; 73 years ago
- In use: 1954–present

Garrison information
- Current commander: BG George C. Hackler (Senior Commander)

Natick Soldier Systems Center occupies 78 acres (320,000 m^{2}) at its main Natick campus and has an additional 46 acres (190,000 m^{2}) in neighboring communities. The main campus is located to the northwest of Natick center and abuts upon Lake Cochituate. The installation includes facilities from all the military services, not just the Army, and is so configured to allow cross-service cooperation and collaboration both within the facility and with the many academic, industrial and governmental institutions in the Greater Boston area.

Employee/tenant numbers total 1,957 (159 military personnel, 1,048 civilians and 750 contractors).

The SSC public relations office reported that the installation’s FY2006 funding totaled approximately $1 billion, and that SSC organizations infused more than $135 million annually into the local economy through installation salaries, utilities, and local contracts.

The installation commander is a United States Army brigadier general, currently Brig. Gen. George C. Hackler. BG Hackler also serves as the deputy commanding general of U.S. Army Combat Capabilities Development Command.

== Mission ==
NSSC includes facilities designed to research and test both materials (textiles, combat rations), advanced technologies and human performance (human research volunteers) under simulated environmental extremes (altitude, heat, cold, wind, etc.). The requirement for improved combat rations has led to groundbreaking developments in the field of food irradiation and freeze-drying techniques. Improved body armor, new military parachuting technology, and enhanced military garments designed for a variety of environments are all ongoing efforts.

== History ==
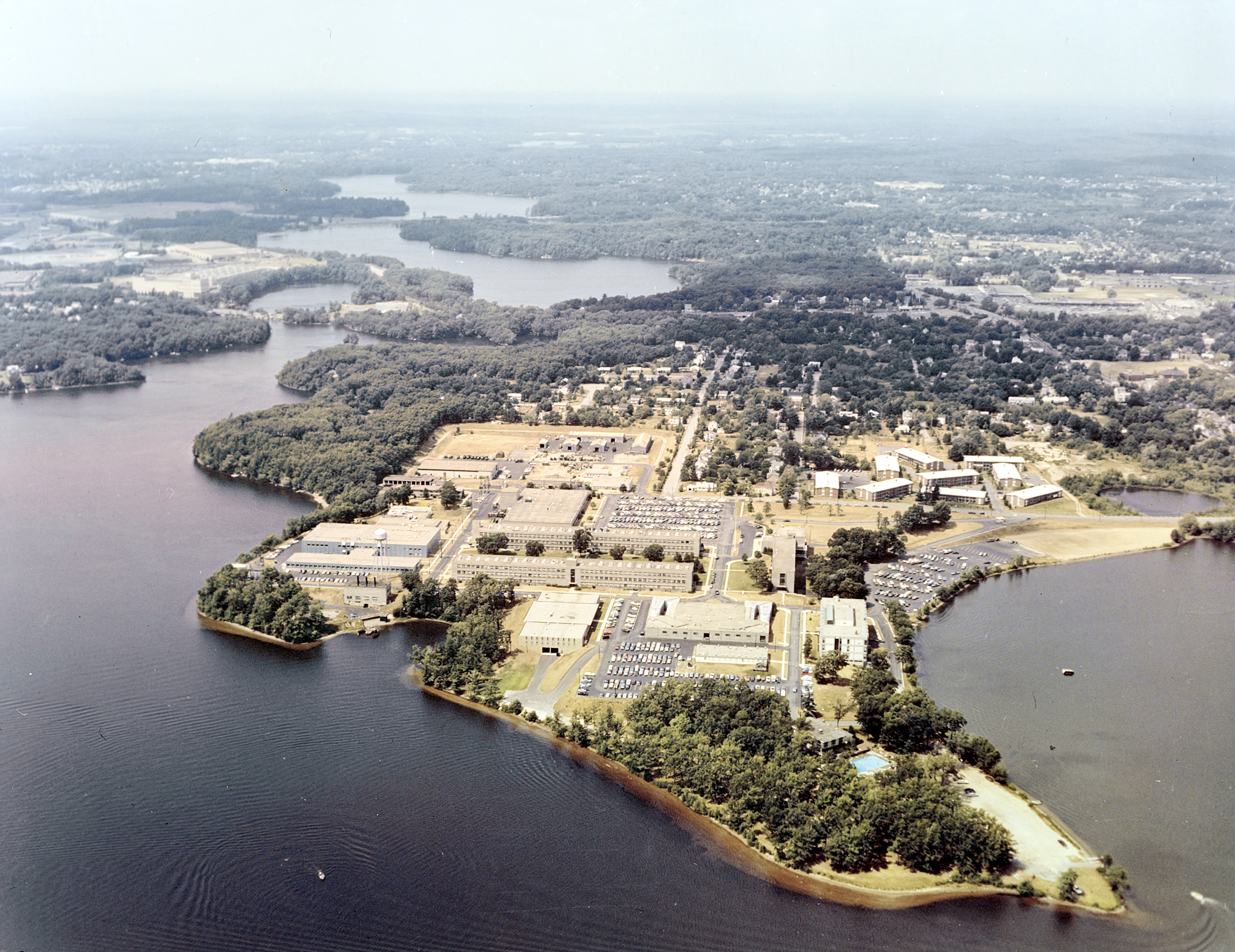
Natick Laboratories on Lake Cochituate, ca. 1960

Following World War II, the Army began to investigate the possibility of establishing a consolidated Quartermaster research and development complex. Distanced locations led to duplications of effort. Quartermaster-type work was then performed at:

- the Office of the Quartermaster General, in Washington, D.C.,
- the Jeffersonville Quartermaster Depot, located in Jeffersonville, Indiana, housed the textile and mechanical shops,
- the Philadelphia Quartermaster Depot, located in Philadelphia, Pennsylvania, housed the Pioneering Research Laboratory and the Chemicals and Plastics and Textile laboratories,
- the Climatic Research Laboratory, in Lawrence, Massachusetts, and
- the Quartermaster Food and Container Institute for the Armed Forces, headquartered in Chicago, Illinois.

The Quartermaster Research Laboratory at Natick, Massachusetts, was authorized by Congress in October 1949. Construction on the laboratory began in November 1952. The ceremonial laying of a cornerstone for the Natick facility happened on 30 May 1953, with Speaker Joseph W. Martin Jr., Sen. Leverett Saltonstall, Sen. John F. Kennedy, and others in attendance.

In October 1953, the Quartermaster Research Laboratory was redesignated as the Quartermaster Research and Development Center (QM R&D Center), and designated a Quartermaster Class II installation. Also in October 1953, the Quartermaster Research and Development Command (QM R&D Command) was established at Natick, Massachusetts. The laboratory, officially known as the Quartermaster R&D Center, was operable by summer 1954.

In January 1957, the QM R&D Command was redesignated as the Quartermaster Research and Engineering Command (QM R&E Command). Around that time, the QM R&D Center was renamed as the Quartermaster Research and Engineering Center (QM R&E Center).

=== 1960s ===
In July 1961, the U.S. Army Research Institute of Environmental Medicine (USARIEM) was activated at the Natick installation.

The Quartermaster R&E Center was placed under the U.S. Army Materiel Command (AMC) in July 1962, and in November that year, was redesignated as the U.S. Army Natick Laboratories. In August 1963, the Quartermaster Food and Container Institute for the Armed Forces (QMFCI) moved to Natick. The Navy Clothing and Textile Research Facility (NCTRF) relocated from Bayonne, New Jersey, to Natick in July 1967.

=== 1970s ===
Natick Laboratories was assigned to the U.S. Army Troop Support Command (TROSCOM) in July 1973. Nearly two years later, in March 1975, Natick Laboratories was renamed as the U.S. Army Natick Development Center and was reassigned to AMC. In January 1976, the NDC became the U.S. Army Natick Research and Development Command (NARADCOM), which remained a reporting unit to the then-renamed AMC, the U.S. Army Materiel Development and Readiness Command (DARCOM).

=== 1980s ===
NARADCOM was redesignated as the U.S. Army Natick Research and Development Laboratories in September 1980. The laboratory was renamed as the U.S. Army Natick Research and Development Center in October 1983, when it was reassigned to TROSCOM.

In 1982, Natick Laboratories surrendered control to Fort Devens of 3,100 acres in the Massachusetts towns of Hudson, Maynard, Stow and Sudbury to become a field training facility. The land was an ordnance supply depot during World War II. After being an Environmental Protection Agency "superfund" cleanup site in the 1990s, it became the Assabet River National Wildlife Refuge.

On 1 October 1986, NRDC was redesignated as the U.S. Army Natick Research, Development and Engineering Center (NRDEC). The new NRDEC accompanied three other then-renamed research, development and engineering centers (RDECs): the Armament RDEC, the Belvoir RDEC, and the Chemical RDEC.

=== 1990s ===
The NRDEC was assigned to the U.S. Army Aviation and Troop Command (ATCOM) in October 1992. (Elements of AMC and TROSCOM merged in July 1992 to form the ATCOM, located in St. Louis, Missouri.)

The U.S. Army Soldier Systems Command (SSCOM) was activated at the Natick installation in November 1994. Elements subsequently established at the Natick installation included the Sustainment and Readiness Directorate (February 1995) and Product Manager, Soldier Support (October 1995). Elements subsequently relocated to Natick included the Clothing and Services Office from Fort Lee, Virginia, (October 1996) and the Product Manager, Force Provider (June 1997). In October 1997, the Sustainment and Readiness Directorate became the SSCOM Integrated Materiel Management Center (IMMC).

In October 1998, the SSCOM merged with the U.S. Army Chemical Biological Defense Command (CBDCOM), forming the U.S. Army Soldier and Biological Chemical Command (SBCCOM). At that time, the installation was renamed as the Soldier Systems Center (SSC). Around that time, the SSCOM IMMC transitioned to become the SBCCOM IMMC, incorporating the mission of managing chemical and biological defense equipment from CBDCOM. Also in October 1998, NRDEC was redesignated as the U.S. Army Natick Soldier Center (NSC).

=== 2000s ===
In January 2002, the Product Manager, Soldier Support was replaced by the Product Manager, Force Sustainment Systems (PM FSS). PM FSS was a part of the Project Manager, Force Projection (PM FP), which was a component of the Program Executive Office, Combat Support and Combat Service Support (PEO CS&CSS). The PM FSS remained at Natick, and incorporated the Product Manager, Force Provider.

When SBCCOM was discontinued in 2003, the command's IMMC was transferred to the U.S. Army Tank-automotive and Armaments Command (TACOM), incorporating the IMMC's mission of managing the Army's soldier equipment and chemical and biological (CB) defense equipment under TACOM.

In June 2003, the NSC was transferred to the newly established U.S. Army Research, Development and Engineering Command (RDECOM). In the late 2000s, the NSC was redesignated as the U.S. Army Natick Soldier Research, Development and Engineering Center (NSRDEC).

In October 2003, the U.S. Army Garrison Natick was established, a component of the U.S. Army Installation Management Agency (IMA). (Later, the IMA transitioned into the U.S. Army Installation Management Command).

=== 2010s ===
On 3 February 2019, NSRDEC was renamed as the U.S. Army CCDC Soldier Center (of Combat Capabilities Development Command). Afterward, the abbreviation gradually transitioned from CCDC Soldier Center to the U.S. Army DEVCOM Soldier Center.

=== 2020s ===
In October 2025, the U.S. Army Futures Command (AFC) and the U.S. Army Training and Doctrine Command (TRADOC) merged, forming the U.S. Army Transformation and Training Command (T2COM), which unified the recruitment, training, and equipment development functions in one command. DEVCOM, previously under AFC, was placed under the U.S. Army Futures and Concepts Command (FCC), a command under T2COM.

DEVCOM Soldier Center's parent headquarters is DEVCOM. The U.S. Army Research Institute of Environmental Medicine (USARIEM), a part of U.S. Army Medical Research and Development Command (MRDC), is also now under FCC.

== Tenant units and facilities ==
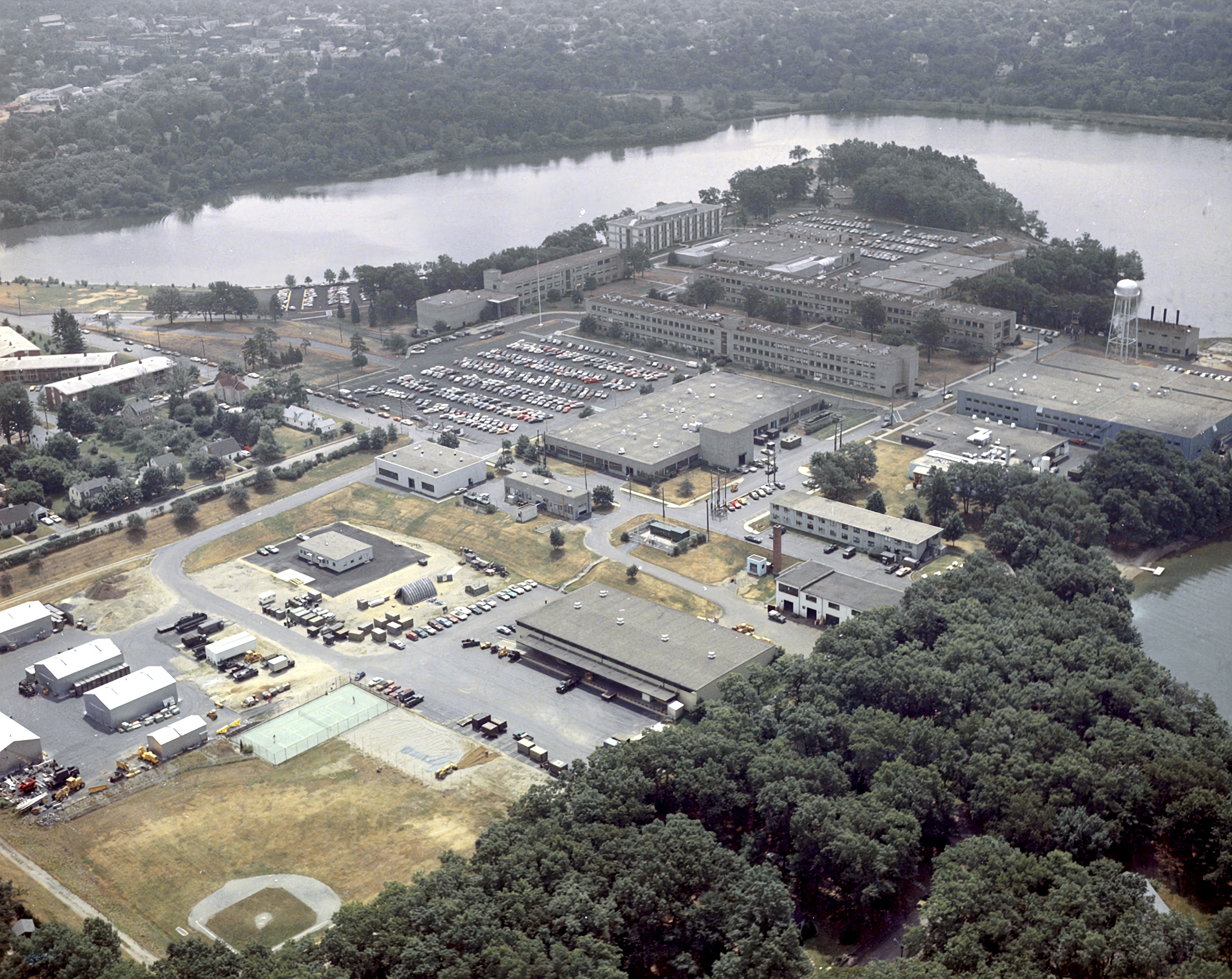
Natick Laboratories view, facing south-east

NSSC hosts several tenant units and facilities. The following lists detail them.

List of tenant centers, offices, and elements:

- U.S. Army DEVCOM Soldier Center, an element of the U.S. Army Combat Capabilities Development Command (DEVCOM)
- U.S. Army Research Institute of Environmental Medicine (USARIEM), a laboratory of the U.S. Army Medical Research and Development Command (MRDC)
- U.S. Army Installation Management Command (IMCOM)
- U.S. Army Integrated Logistics and Support Center (ILSC)
- Coast Guard Clothing Design and Technical Office (CDTO)
- Navy Clothing and Textile Research Facility (NCTRF)
- Elements of PM-Soldier Equipment (part of Program Executive Office, Soldier, with its main facilities located at Fort Belvoir, Virginia)
- U.S. Army Product Manager, Force Sustainment Systems (PM FSS)

Additional services:

- An office of the General Services Administration (GSA)
- An office of the Hanscom Federal Credit Union
- An office of the U.S. Army Health Services Command
- An office of the Defense Automated Printing Service
- An office of the U.S. Army Audit Agency

List of facilities and laboratories:

- The Doriot Climatic Chamber Complex
- Combat Rations Production and Packaging Facility
- 3-D Anthropometrics Laboratory
- Camouflage Evaluation Facility
- Rain Court
- Hydro-Environmental Chamber
- Shade Room
- Fiber Plant
- Thermal and Flame Laboratory
- Military Operations in Urban Environment (MOUT) Lab/Facility

== List of commanding generals ==
No.	Commanding General		Term		
No.	Portrait	Name	Took office	Left office	Duration
As U.S. Army Soldier Systems Command
1	Henry T. Glisson	Brigadier General; Henry T. Glisson	November 1994	May 1996	~1 year, 182 days
As U.S. Army Soldier Systems Center
-	Philip M. Mattox	Brigadier General; Philip M. Mattox	June/July 2000	6 August 2001	~1 year, 31 days
-	James L. Kennon	Brigadier General; James L. Kennon	6 August 2001	9 July 2002	337 days
-	Craig A. Peterson	Brigadier General; Craig A. Peterson	9 July 2002	10 October 2003	1 year, 93 days
-	David J. Bongi	Colonel; David J. Bongi	10 October 2003	7 July 2004	271 days
-	James R. Moran	Brigadier General; James R. Moran	7 July 2004	~25 July 2006	~2 years, 18 days
-	R. Mark Brown	Brigadier General; R. Mark Brown	25 July 2006	21 November 2008	2 years, 119 days
As U.S. Army Natick Soldier Systems Center
-	Peter N. Fuller	Brigadier General; Peter N. Fuller	21 November 2008	27 August 2009	279 days
-	Harold J. Greene	Brigadier General; Harold J. Greene	27 August 2009	10 May 2011	1 year, 256 days
-	John J. McGuiness	Brigadier General; John J. McGuiness	10 May 2011	5 December 2013	2 years, 209 days
-	William E. Cole	Brigadier General; William E. Cole	5 December 2013	24 November 2015	1 year, 354 days
-	Thomas H. Todd III	Brigadier General; Thomas H. Todd III	24 November 2015	5 January 2017	1 year, 42 days
-	Anthony W. Potts	Brigadier General; Anthony W. Potts	5 January 2017	5 January 2018	1 year, 0 days
-	Vincent F. Malone II	Brigadier General; Vincent F. Malone II	5 January 2018	~May 2020	~2 years, 117 days
-	James P. Bienlien	Brigadier General; James P. Bienlien	May 2020	8 June 2021	~1 year, 38 days
-	David C. Trybula	Brigadier General; David C. Trybula	8 June 2021	31 July 2024	3 years, 53 days
-	George C. Hackler	Brigadier General; George C. Hackler	31 July 2024	Incumbent	2 years, 65 days

== Products and systems ==
Natick Labs has developed or is developing the following items or systems:

- Meal, Ready-to-Eat
- Unitized Group Ration
- Irradiated food
- The "instant chapel"
- Bulletproof clothing
- MOLLE load-carriage equipment
- Land Warrior
- Future Soldier
- Future Force Warrior
- Collective Protection Shelters
- Personnel Armor System for Ground Troops
- Interceptor Body Armor
- Quarpel, a water-repellent, water and stain resistant textile treatment

== See also ==
- PEO Soldier, program executive office
- Engineer Research and Development Laboratories (1947–67), a predecessor and coexisting U.S. Army laboratory
- List of military installations in Massachusetts
- Armed Forces Recipe Service (maintained by Natick Labs until 2009)
