= Kim Kastens =

American geophysicist

Kim Anne Kastens
- Born: 1954 (age 71–72); Menlo Park, California
- Education: Yale University; Scripps Institution of Oceanography
- Scientific career
- Workplaces: Lamont–Doherty Earth Observatory; Columbia University
- Thesis: Structural causes and sedimentological effects of "Cobblestone Topography" in the Eastern Mediterranean Sea (1981)

Kim Anne Kastens (born 1954) is an American geophysicist who is a professor at the Lamont–Doherty Earth Observatory. She was awarded the American Geophysical Union Excellence in Earth and Space Science Education Award in 2009 and elected Fellow in 2021.

== Early life and education ==
Kastens was born in Menlo Park, California. She was an undergraduate student at Yale University, where she majored in geology and geophysics. After earning her bachelor's diploma in 1975, Kastens moved to the Scripps Institution of Oceanography, where she completed her doctoral research.

== Research and career ==
Kastens joined the faculty at the Lamont–Doherty Earth Observatory in 1992, and was made Research Professor in 2010. Her work considered marine geology, with a focus on the tectonic and geological evolution of the Mediterranean Sea. She made use of deep sea drilling to understand the growth of the Tyrrhenian Sea, and seafloor mapping to understand deformation across the Mediterranean Ridge.

At Columbia University, Kastens contributed to the development of geoscience education.

== Awards and honors ==
- 2009 American Geophysical Union Excellence in Earth and Space Science Education Award
- 2021 Elected Fellow of the American Geophysical Union

== Selected publications ==
- KIM KASTENS; JEAN MASCLE; CHRISTIAN AUROUX; et al. (July 1988). "ODP Leg 107 in the Tyrrhenian Sea: Insights into passive margin and back-arc basin evolution". Geological Society of America Bulletin. 100 (7): 1140–1156. Bibcode:1988GSAB..100.1140K. doi:10.1130/0016-7606(1988)100<1140:olitts>2.3.co;2. ISSN 0016-7606. Wikidata Q56545011.
- Kastens, Kim A.; CITA, Maria B. (1981-11-01). "Tsunami-induced sediment transport in the abyssal Mediterranean Sea". GSA Bulletin. 92 (11): 845–857. Bibcode:1981GSAB...92..845K. doi:10.1130/0016-7606(1981)92<845:TSTITA>2.0.CO;2. ISSN 0016-7606.
- Kahle, Hans-Gert; Straub, Christian; Reilinger, Robert; McClusky, Simon; King, Robert; Hurst, Kenneth; Veis, George; Kastens, Kim; Cross, Paul (1998-09-15). "The strain rate field in the eastern Mediterranean region, estimated by repeated GPS measurements". Tectonophysics. 294 (3): 237–252. Bibcode:1998Tectp.294..237K. doi:10.1016/S0040-1951(98)00102-4. ISSN 0040-1951.
