= Doriot Climatic Chambers =

Coordinates: 42°17′18″N 71°21′45″W

- The DCC logo
- Active: 1952 – present
- Country: United States
- Allegiance: United States
- Branch: United States Army
- Type: Environmental chamber facility

The Doriot Climatic Chambers (DCCs) are a pair of very large, highly specialized wind tunnels/environmental chambers located at the U.S. Army’s Soldier Systems Center (SSC) in Natick, Massachusetts. Built in 1952, the Chambers are a unique facility, capable of simulating an extreme range of global weather conditions for the testing of both the physical properties of military equipment and the physiology and adaptations of human subjects.

A variety of tenants utilize the DCCs, which are operated by the U.S. Army Research, Development, and Engineering Command (RDECOM).

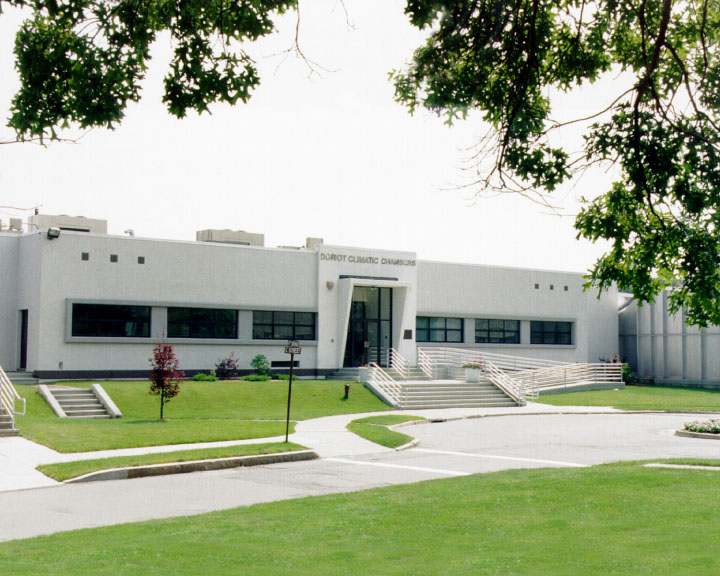
The Doriot Climatic Chambers, Natick, Massachusetts.

== History ==
The DCCs were constructed from 1952 to 1954 at the time of the founding of what is now the U.S. Army Research, Development, and Engineering Command (RDECOM) and Center.

At a rededication ceremony on 24 August 1994, the facility was named for Brigadier General Georges F. Doriot (1899–1987), a French-American who, during World War II, worked with a large staff in the Quartermaster Corps to develop, test and quickly field improved clothing and equipment for the U.S. soldier.

A major renovation was completed in 1996.

== Research ==
=== Users ===
A number of tenants of the SSC utilize the DCCs including USARIEM, the NCTRF, and the USMC.

=== Equipment testing ===
Examples of military equipment evaluated at the DCC include tents, parachutes, heaters, airbeams, medical devices and wild mills. The heat transfer properties of a wide range of new protective military clothing are tested at the DCC. Constant control of temperature (to within +/- 1 °F) is possible with simultaneous control of both wind and humidity. (Other chambers in the world have only two-environmental-parameter capability, making the DCCs unique.) External observer and test monitoring areas have electronic data acquisition systems to record a variety of testing parameters and provide customized plotting, graphing and printouts.

=== Human research ===
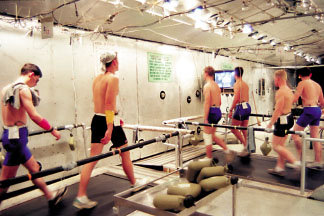
Human volunteers endure treadmill sessions at the Doriot Climatic Chambers.

The DCCs are man-rated for human safety. Human research in the DCC is aimed at the prevention of injuries and the minimizing of performance decrements in order to enhance overall operational effectiveness. The Chambers simulate types of environmental conditions that soldiers may encounter in the course of their real world duties. Soldier (and civilian) volunteers walk or run on treadmills to simulate a variety of work rates at different environmental extremes. Each chamber has two 5-person treadmills that can operate up to 15 mph (24 km/h) at a 12% grade. A facility kitchen prepares meals to test the effects of nutrition on physical performance. The DCCs include a dormitory facility for sleep studies as well as dressing rooms, showers and laundering facilities which support prolonged live-in studies.

== Specifications and capabilities ==
The dimensions of each of the two wind tunnels (Tropic Wind Tunnel and Arctic Wind Tunnel) are 60 by 10 by 15 feet (4.6 m). Equipment scheduled for testing enters the tunnels via 8-foot (2.4 m) high by 10-foot (3.0 m) wide doors. In addition, chambers of 30 by 18 by 14 feet (4.3 m) occupy the area at the back of each tunnel.

=== Tropic Wind Tunnel ===
- −18 to 74 °C (0 to 165 °F)
- 10-90% relative humidity
- Simulated rain up to 4 inches/hour
- Simulated wind up to 40 mph (64 km/h)
- Solar loading capability

=== Arctic Wind Tunnel ===
- −57 to 49 °C (−71 to 120 °F)
- 10-90% relative humidity
- Simulated rain up to 4 inches/hour
- Simulated wind up to 40 mph (64 km/h)
- Solar loading capability

=== Tropic Conditioning Room ===
- Dimensions: 24 by 12 by 10 feet (3.0 m)
- −57.8 to 73.9 °C (−72.0 to 165.0 °F)
- 10-90% relative humidity above 40 °F (4 °C)

=== Arctic Conditioning Room ===
- Dimensions: 24 by 12 by 10 feet (3.0 m)
- −57.8 to 73.9 °C (−72.0 to 165.0 °F)
