= List of awards and nominations received by Ben Affleck =

Ben Affleck awards and nominations
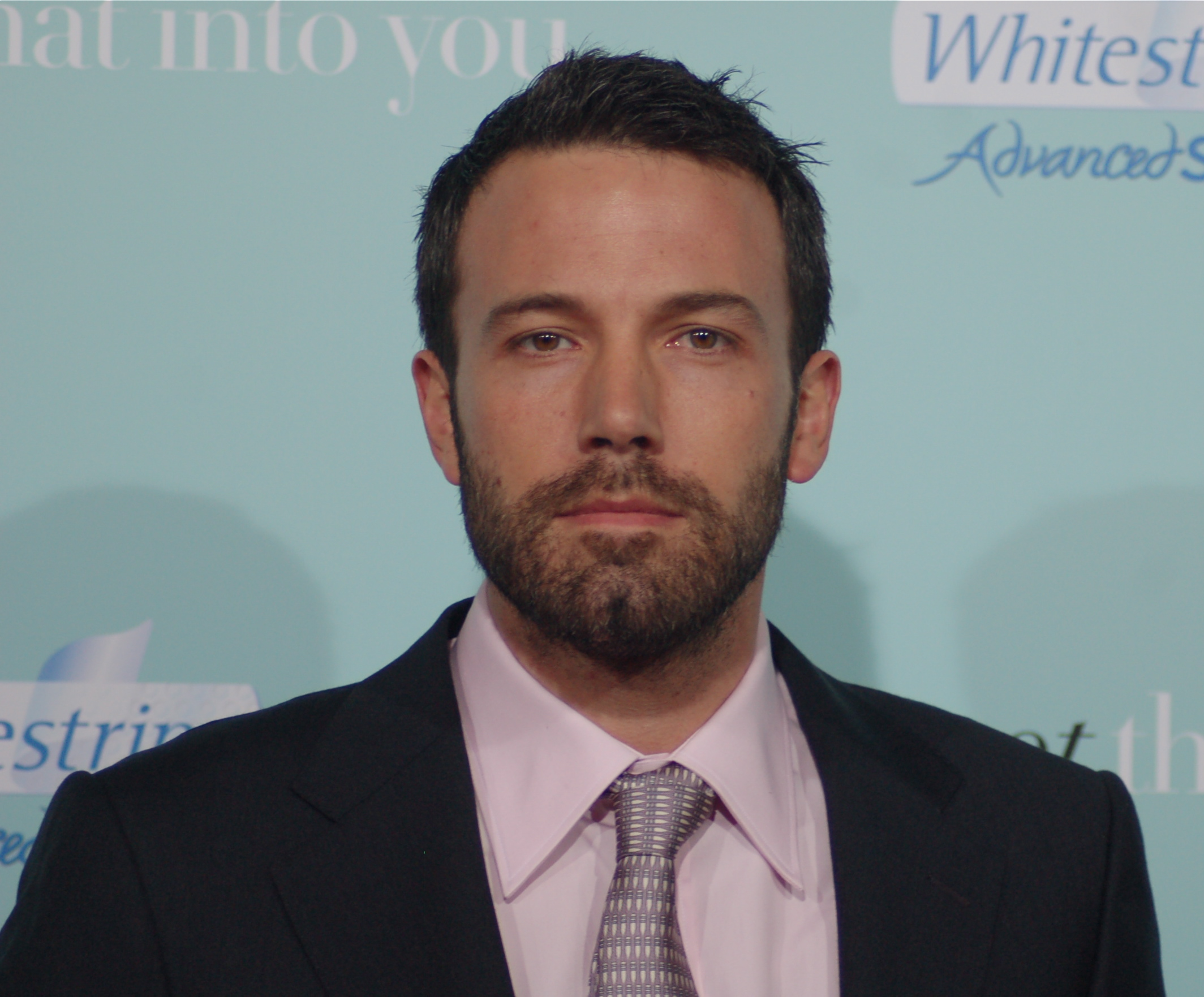
- Affleck at the 2015 San Diego Comic-Con
Awards and nominations
Award	Wins	Nominations
Academy Awards	2	2
BAFTA Awards	2	3
Golden Globe Awards	3	6
Primetime Emmy Awards	0	4
Screen Actors Guild Awards	2	4

Totals (Note: Certain award groups do not simply award one winner. They acknowledge several different recipients, have runners-up, and have third place. Since this is a specific recognition and is different from losing an award, runner-up mentions are considered wins in this award tally. For simplification and to avoid errors, each award in this list has been presumed to have had a prior nomination.)
- Wins: 54
- Nominations: 133

American actor and filmmaker Ben Affleck has received many awards and honors throughout his career. He is the recipient of two Academy Awards, three Golden Globe Awards, two BAFTA Awards, and two Screen Actors Guild Awards. Affleck first gained recognition as a screenwriter for co-writing Good Will Hunting (1997) with Matt Damon, winning both the Academy Award for Best Original Screenplay and the Golden Globe Award for Best Screenplay. As an actor, he garnered a Golden Globe nomination and the Best Actor Award at the Venice Film Festival for his performance in Hollywoodland (2006). The film Argo (2012), which he directed, produced, and starred in, earned considerable acclaim and numerous accolades including the Golden Globe Award for Best Director, BAFTA Award for Best Direction, and Directors Guild of America Award for Outstanding Directing – Feature Film, as well as the Academy Award for Best Picture, BAFTA Award for Best Film, and Golden Globe Award for Best Motion Picture – Drama.

Beginning his career as a child actor, Affleck starred in the PBS educational series The Voyage of the Mimi in 1984 and its sequel in 1988. Following a brief appearance in the coming-of-age film Dazed and Confused (1993), he was cast in his first lead role in the romantic comedy-drama Chasing Amy (1997). The film Good Will Hunting, co-starring and co-written by Affleck and Damon, was released in 1997 to widespread acclaim and won the Golden Globe and Academy Award for Best Original Screenplay. At the age of 25, Affleck became the youngest writer to ever win an Oscar for screenwriting.

Affleck next appeared in a wide range of studio films including the disaster film Armageddon (1998), the period film Shakespeare in Love (1998), the war drama Pearl Harbor (2001), and the thriller film Changing Lanes (2002). In 2003, he suffered a career downturn marked by tabloid notoriety and a string of critical flops and Razzie Awards winners, such as the superhero film Daredevil and the romantic comedy crime film Gigli. He returned to prominence in 2006 with his performance as the former Superman actor George Reeves in the mystery film Hollywoodland. The following year Affleck directed his first feature film, Gone Baby Gone. The neo-noir drama, starring his brother Casey Affleck, received critical praise and various accolades for Best Directorial Debut. His reputation as a filmmaker continued to grow with his subsequent efforts, the crime drama The Town (2010) and the historical drama Argo. In 2014 he starred in the psychological thriller Gone Girl, before taking on the role of Batman in the DC Extended Universe in 2016. Later that year he directed, wrote, and starred in the gangster film Live by Night.

== Major industry awards ==
=== Academy Awards ===
The Academy Awards, also known as The Oscars, is a set of awards given annually by the Academy of Motion Picture Arts and Sciences to recognize excellence in cinematic achievements.

Year	Category	Nominated work	Result	Ref.
1998	Best Original Screenplay (Note: Shared with Matt Damon)	Good Will Hunting	Won	
2013	Best Picture (Note: As producer)	Argo	Won	

=== British Academy Film Awards ===
The British Academy Film Awards or BAFTA Film Awards are given annually by the British Academy of Film and Television Arts to reward outstanding contributions to British and international film.

Year	Category	Nominated work	Result	Ref.
2013	Best Film	Argo	Won	
2013	Best Direction	Argo	Won	
2013	Best Actor in a Leading Role	Argo	Nominated	

=== Golden Globe Awards ===
The Golden Globe Awards are accolades bestowed by the Hollywood Foreign Press Association to recognize distinguished achievements in film and television.

Year	Category	Nominated work	Result	Ref.
1998	Best Screenplay	Good Will Hunting	Won	
2007	Best Supporting Actor – Motion Picture	Hollywoodland	Nominated	
2013	Best Motion Picture – Drama	Argo	Won	
2013	Best Director	Argo	Won	
2022	Best Supporting Actor – Motion Picture	The Tender Bar	Nominated	
2024	Best Motion Picture – Musical or Comedy	Air	Nominated	

=== Primetime Emmy Awards ===
The Primetime Emmy Award is presented by the Academy of Television Arts & Sciences in recognition of excellence in American primetime television programming.

Year	Category	Nominated work	Result	Ref.
2002	Outstanding Reality Program	Project Greenlight	Nominated	
2004	Outstanding Reality Program	Project Greenlight	Nominated	
2005	Outstanding Reality Program	Project Greenlight	Nominated	
2016	Outstanding Unstructured Reality Program	Project Greenlight	Nominated	

=== Sports Emmy Awards ===
The Sports Emmy Awards are bestowed by the National Academy of Television Arts and Sciences in recognition of excellence in American sports television programming.

Year	Category	Nominated work	Result	Ref.
2026	Outstanding Sports Documentary Series	Believers: Boston Red Sox	Nominated	

== Guild awards ==
=== Directors Guild of America Awards ===
The Directors Guild of America Award is given annually by the Directors Guild of America to honor directors for their directorial achievement in film and television.

Year	Category	Nominated work	Result	Ref.
2012	Outstanding Directorial Achievement in Motion Pictures	Argo	Won	

=== Producers Guild of America Awards ===
The Producers Guild of America Award is given annually by the Producers Guild of America to honor the finest producing work in film and television.

Year	Category	Nominated work	Result	Ref.
2012	Best Theatrical Motion Picture	Argo	Won	

=== Screen Actors Guild Awards ===
The Screen Actors Guild Award (also known as the SAG Award) is presented annually by the Screen Actors Guild‐American Federation of Television and Radio Artists to honor outstanding performers in film and television.

Year	Category	Nominated work	Result	Ref.
1998	Outstanding Performance by a Cast in a Motion Picture (Note: Shared with the cast)	Good Will Hunting	Nominated	
1999	Outstanding Performance by a Cast in a Motion Picture	Shakespeare in Love	Won	
2013	Outstanding Performance by a Cast in a Motion Picture	Argo	Won	
2022	Outstanding Performance by a Male Actor in a Supporting Role	The Tender Bar	Nominated	

=== Writers Guild of America Awards ===
The Writers Guild of America Award is given annually by the Writers Guild of America, East and Writers Guild of America, West for outstanding achievements in film, television and media writing.

Year	Category	Nominated work	Result	Ref.
1997	Best Original Screenplay	Good Will Hunting	Nominated	
2010	Best Adapted Screenplay (Note: Shared with Peter Craig and Aaron Stockard)	The Town	Nominated	

== Film festivals' awards ==
=== Amanda Award ===
Established in 1985, the Amanda Award is an award given annually at the Norwegian International Film Festival in Haugesund, Norway.

Year	Category	Nominated work	Result	Ref.
2013	Best Foreign Feature	Argo	Nominated	

=== Palm Springs International Film Festival ===
Founded in 1989, the Palm Springs International Film Festival is a film festival held annually in Palm Springs, California.

Year	Category	Nominated work	Result	Ref.
2011	Chairman's Award	The Town	Won	
2013	Ensemble Performance Award	Argo	Won	

=== Santa Barbara International Film Festival ===
Founded in 1986, the Santa Barbara International Film Festival is a film festival held annually in Santa Barbara, California.

Year	Category	Nominee	Result	Ref.
2013	Modern Master Award	Ben Affleck	Won	

=== Toronto International Film Festival ===
The Toronto International Film Festival (TIFF) is held annually in Toronto as one of the largest film festivals in the world.

Year	Category	Nominated work	Result	Ref.
2012	People's Choice Award	Argo	Runner-up	

=== Venice Film Festival ===
The Venice Film Festival or Venice International Film Festival is the oldest film festival in the world. It was founded in 1932 and held annually in Venice.

Year	Category	Nominated work	Result	Ref.
2006	Volpi Cup for Best Actor	Hollywoodland	Won	

== Other awards and nominations ==
=== American Film Institute Awards ===
The American Film Institute Awards is presented annually by American Film Institute to honors 10 outstanding films and 10 outstanding television programs of the year.

Year	Category	Nominated work	Result	Ref.
2012	Movie of the Year	Argo	Won	

=== AACTA International Awards ===
The AACTA International Awards are presented annually by the Australian Academy of Cinema and Television Arts (AACTA) to recognize film excellence, regardless of geography.

Year	Category	Nominated work	Result	Ref.
2012	Best Direction	Argo	Nominated	
2012	Best Film	Argo	Nominated	

=== César Awards ===
The César Award is the national film award of France supported by the French Ministry of Culture. First awarded in 1976, it is the French equivalent of the Academy Award in the United States.

Year	Category	Nominated work	Result	Ref.
2012	Best Foreign Film	Argo	Won	

=== Golden Raspberry Awards ===
Co-founded by UCLA film graduates and industry veterans John J. B. Wilson and Mo Murphy, the Golden Raspberry Awards (also known as Razzies and Razzie Awards) is an award saluting the worst that Hollywood has to offer each year.

Year	Category	Nominated work	Result	Ref.
1998	Worst Screen Couple Shared with Liv Tyler	Armageddon	Nominated	
2001	Worst Actor	Pearl Harbor	Nominated	
2001	Worst Screen Couple Shared with either Kate Beckinsale or Josh Hartnett	Pearl Harbor	Nominated	
2003	Worst Actor	Daredevil, Gigli and Paycheck	Won	
2003	Worst Screen Couple Shared with Jennifer Lopez	Gigli	Won	
2004	Worst Screen Couple Shared with either Jennifer Lopez or Liv Tyler	Jersey Girl	Nominated	
2004	Worst Actor	Jersey Girl and Surviving Christmas	Nominated	
2009	Worst Actor of the Decade	Daredevil, Gigli, Jersey Girl, Paycheck, Pearl Harbor and Surviving Christmas	Nominated	
2014	Razzie Redeemer Award	From Razzie winner of Gigli to Oscar darling for Argo and Gone Girl	Won	
2016	Worst Actor	Batman v Superman: Dawn of Justice	Nominated	
2016	Worst Screen Combo Shared with Henry Cavill	Batman v Superman: Dawn of Justice	Won	
2021	Worst Supporting Actor	The Last Duel	Nominated	

=== Hollywood Film Awards ===
The Hollywood Film Awards is an American film award ceremony held annually to recognize excellence in the art of cinema and filmmaking.

Year	Category	Nominated work	Result	Ref.
2006	Hollywood Supporting Actor Award	Hollywoodland	Won	
2007	Hollywood Breakthrough Director Award	Gone Baby Gone	Won	
2012	Hollywood Ensemble Cast Award	Argo	Won	

=== Humanitas Prize ===
Founded in 1974, the Humanitas Prize is a prize awarded to film and television writers whose work "affirm the dignity of the human person, probe the meaning of life and enlighten the use of human freedom."

Year	Category	Nominated work	Result	Ref.
1998	Feature Film	Good Will Hunting	Won	

=== Irish Film & Television Awards ===
The Irish Film & Television Awards are presented annually by the Irish Film & Television Academy to honor the best in films and television.

Year	Category	Nominated work	Result	Ref.
2013	Best International Actor	Argo	Nominated	
2013	Best International Film	Argo	Won	

=== Kids' Choice Awards ===
The Kids' Choice Awards is an annual awards show that airs on the Nickelodeon cable channel to honor its viewers' favorite television, film and music acts of the year.

Year	Category	Nominated work	Result	Ref.
2000	Favorite Movie Couple (Note: Shared with Sandra Bullock)	Forces of Nature	Nominated	
2017	Favorite Movie Actor	Batman v Superman: Dawn of Justice	Nominated	
2017	Favorite Butt-Kicker	Batman v Superman: Dawn of Justice	Nominated	
2017	Favorite Frenemies (Note: Shared with Henry Cavill)	Batman v Superman: Dawn of Justice	Nominated	
2018	Favorite Movie Actor	Justice League	Nominated	

=== MTV Movie & TV Awards ===
The MTV Movie & TV Awards is presented annually on MTV to honor the best in film and television, as chosen by a national poll of MTV viewers.

Year	Category	Nominated work	Result	Ref.
1997	Best On-Screen Duo	Good Will Hunting	Nominated	
1998	Best Male Performance	Armageddon	Nominated	
1998	Best On-Screen Duo (Note: Shared with Liv Tyler)	Armageddon	Nominated	
2000	Best Kiss (Note: Shared with Gwyneth Paltrow)	Bounce	Nominated	
2003	Best Kiss	Daredevil	Nominated	
2012	Best Male Performance	Argo	Nominated	

=== National Board of Review ===
Founded in 1909, the National Board of Review honors outstanding cinema as both art and entertainment.

Year	Category	Nominated work	Result	Ref.
1997	Special Achievement in Filmmaking	Good Will Hunting	Won	
2007	Best Directorial Debut	Gone Baby Gone	Won	
2010	Best Cast	The Town	Won	
2010	Top Ten Films	The Town	Won	
2012	Special Achievement in Filmmaking	Argo	Won	
2012	Top Ten Films	Argo	Won	

=== People's Choice Awards ===
The People's Choice Awards is an annual American awards show recognizing the people and the work of popular culture, as voted by the general public.

Year	Category	Nominated work	Result	Ref.
2012	Favorite Dramatic Movie	Argo	Nominated	
2014	Favorite Dramatic Movie Actor	Gone Girl	Nominated	
2016	Favorite Dramatic Movie Actor	The Accountant	Nominated	

=== Robert Awards ===
The Robert Award is a Danish film prize awarded each year by the Danish Film Academy since 1984.

Year	Category	Nominated work	Result	Ref.
2012	Best American Film	Argo	Won	

=== Satellite Awards ===
The Satellite Awards are presented annually by the International Press Academy to honor excellence in the areas of Motion Pictures, Television, Radio, and New Media.

Year	Category	Nominated work	Result	Ref.
1997	Best Original Screenplay	Good Will Hunting	Won	
2010	Best Director	The Town	Nominated	
2010	Best Adapted Screenplay	The Town	Nominated	
2012	Best Director	Argo	Nominated	
2012	Best Film	Argo	Nominated	

=== Saturn Awards ===
The Saturn Award is an award presented annually by the Academy of Science Fiction, Fantasy and Horror Films; its initial focus was to honor and recognize the genres of science fiction, fantasy and horror films, but has since grown to include additional genres, as well as television and home media releases.

Year	Category	Nominated work	Result	Ref.
1998	Best Supporting Actor	Armageddon	Nominated	
2006	Best Supporting Actor	Hollywoodland	Won	

=== Teen Choice Awards ===
The Teen Choice Awards is an annual awards show that airs on Fox to honor its teen viewers' favorite acts in movies, TV, and music.

Year	Category	Nominated work	Result	Ref.
1999	Choice Movie: Actor	Armageddon	Nominated	
2000	Choice Movie: Actor	Reindeer Games	Nominated	
2000	Choice Film: Sleazebag	Boiler Room	Nominated	
2001	Choice Movie: Actor	Pearl Harbor	Won	
2001	Choice Movie: Chemistry (Note: Shared with Kate Beckinsale)	Pearl Harbor	Nominated	
2002	Choice Movie Actor: Action/Drama	Changing Lanes	Nominated	
2003	Choice Movie Actor: Action/Drama	Daredevil	Nominated	
2003	Choice Movie: Chemistry (Note: Shared with Jennifer Garner)	Daredevil	Nominated	
2013	Choice Movie: Drama	Argo	Nominated	
2013	Choice Movie Actor: Drama	Argo	Nominated	
2016	Choice Movie Actor: Sci-Fi/Fantasy	Batman v Superman: Dawn of Justice	Nominated	

=== Various critics' awards ===
Year	Association	Category	Nominated work	Result	Ref.
1997	Boston Society of Film Critics	Best Screenplay	Good Will Hunting	Nominated	
1997	Florida Film Critics Circle	Best Newcomer	Good Will Hunting	Won	
1997	Broadcast Film Critics Association	Best Original Screenplay	Good Will Hunting	Won	
2006	Broadcast Film Critics Association	Best Supporting Actor	Hollywoodland	Nominated	
2007	Austin Film Critics Association	Best First Film	Gone Baby Gone	Won	
2007	Boston Society of Film Critics	Best New Filmmaker	Gone Baby Gone	Won	
2007	Chicago Film Critics Association	Most Promising Director	Gone Baby Gone	Won	
2007	Online Film Critics Society	Best Breakthrough Filmmaker	Gone Baby Gone	Nominated	
2007	Toronto Film Critics Association	Best First Feature	Gone Baby Gone	Runner-up	
2010	Broadcast Film Critics Association	Best Acting Ensemble	The Town	Nominated	
2010	Broadcast Film Critics Association	Best Adapted Screenplay	The Town	Nominated	
2010	San Diego Film Critics Society	Best Adapted Screenplay	The Town	Nominated	
2010	Washington D.C. Area Film Critics Association	Best Ensemble	The Town	Won	
2012	African-American Film Critics Association	Best Director	Argo	Won	
2012	African-American Film Critics Association	Best Picture	Argo	Nominated	
2012	Alliance of Women Film Journalists	Best Director	Argo	Won	
2012	Alliance of Women Film Journalists	Best Picture	Argo	Won	
2012	Austin Film Critics Association	Best Film	Argo	Runner-up	
2012	Chicago Film Critics Association	Best Director	Argo	Nominated	
2012	Chicago Film Critics Association	Best Film	Argo	Nominated	
2012	Broadcast Film Critics Association	Best Acting Ensemble	Argo	Nominated	
2012	Broadcast Film Critics Association	Best Director	Argo	Won	
2012	Broadcast Film Critics Association	Best Picture	Argo	Won	
2012	Dallas–Fort Worth Film Critics Association	Best Director	Argo	Nominated	
2012	Dallas–Fort Worth Film Critics Association	Best Film	Argo	Nominated	
2012	Detroit Film Critics Society	Best Director	Argo	Nominated	
2012	Detroit Film Critics Society	Best Film	Argo	Nominated	
2012	Gay and Lesbian Entertainment Critics Association	Film of the Year	Argo	Nominated	
2012	Florida Film Critics Circle	Best Director	Argo	Won	
2012	Florida Film Critics Circle	Best Film	Argo	Won	
2012	Houston Film Critics Society	Best Director	Argo	Won	
2012	Houston Film Critics Society	Best Picture	Argo	Won	
2012	London Film Critics' Circle	Film of the Year	Argo	Nominated	
2012	New York Film Critics Circle	Best Director	Argo	Nominated	
2012	New York Film Critics Circle	Best Film	Argo	Nominated	
2012	New York Film Critics Online	Best Ensemble	Argo	Nominated	
2012	Online Film Critics Society	Best Director	Argo	Nominated	
2012	Online Film Critics Society	Best Picture	Argo	Won	
2012	San Diego Film Critics Society	Best Director	Argo	Won	
2012	San Diego Film Critics Society	Best Film	Argo	Won	
2012	St. Louis Film Critics Association	Best Director	Argo	Won	
2012	St. Louis Film Critics Association	Best Picture	Argo	Won	
2012	Washington DC Area Film Critics Association	Best Director	Argo	Nominated	
2012	Washington DC Area Film Critics Association	Best Film	Argo	Nominated	
2020	Hollywood Critics Association	Best Actor	The Way Back	Runner-up	
2021	Critics' Choice Movie Awards	Best Actor	The Way Back	Nominated	

== See also ==
- Ben Affleck filmography
- Ben Affleck's unrealized projects
