= List of accolades received by Argo (2012 film) =

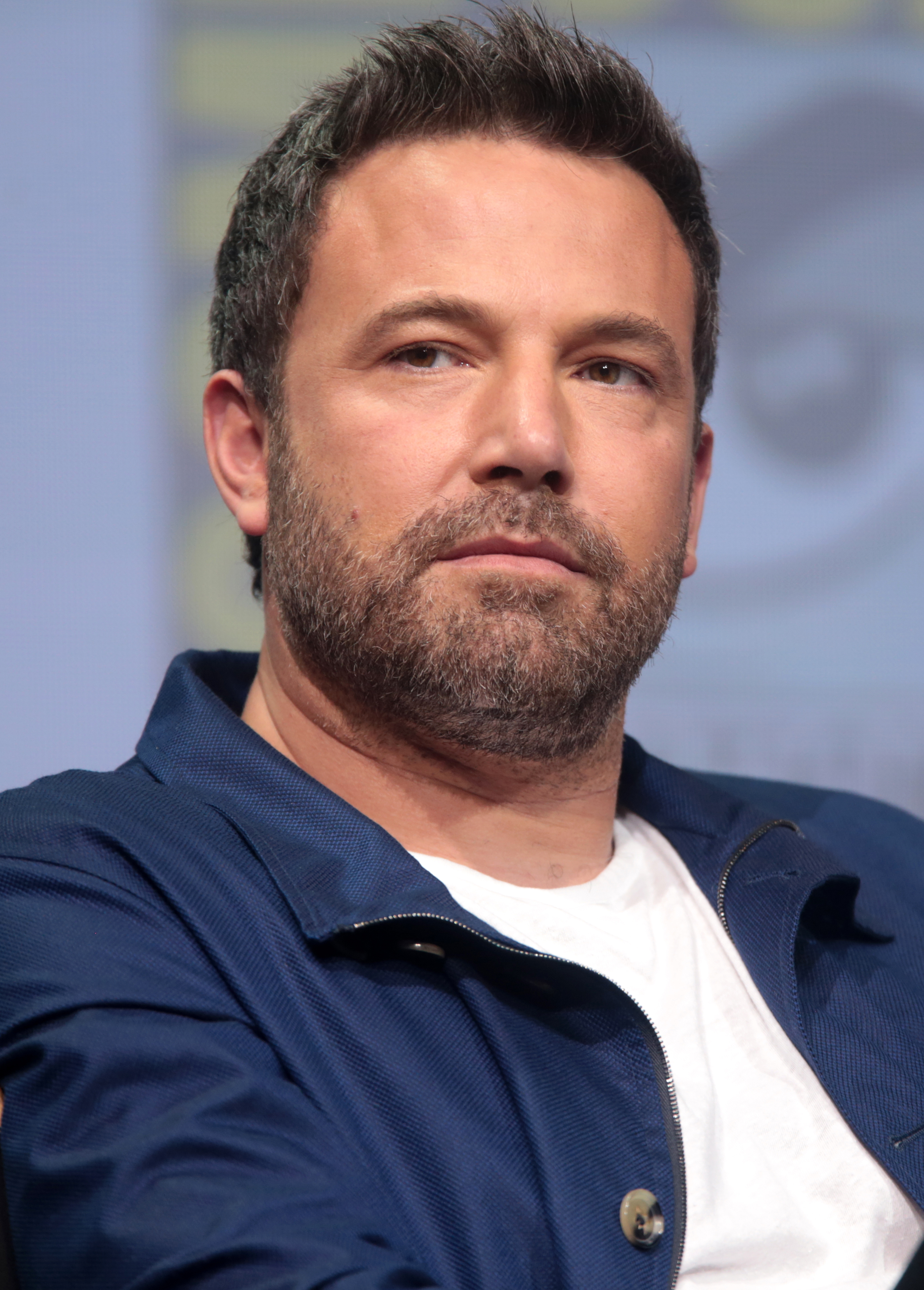
- Ben Affleck received many awards and nominations for producing and directing Argo
Accolades
Award	Won	Nominated
AACTA Awards	0	3
Academy Awards	3	7
African-American Film Critics Association	1	1
Alliance of Women Film Journalists	1	8
Amanda Awards	0	1
American Cinema Editors	1	1
American Film Institute	1	1
Art Directors Guild	0	1
Austin Film Critics Association	1	2
Boston Society of Film Critics	0	1
British Academy Film Awards	3	7
Camerimage	0	1
Casting Society of America	1	1
César Awards	1	1
Chicago Film Critics Association	0	5
Costume Designers Guild	0	1
Critics' Choice Movie Awards	2	7
Dallas–Fort Worth Film Critics Association	0	2
David di Donatello	0	1
Detroit Film Critics Society	0	3
Directors Guild of America Awards	1	1
Dorian Awards	1	1
Empire Awards	0	1
Florida Film Critics Circle	3	3
Golden Globe Awards	2	5
Grammy Awards	0	1
Golden Raspberry Awards	1	1
Hochi Film Award	1	1
Hollywood Film Awards	1	1
Houston Film Critics Society	2	2
International Film Music Critics Association	0	1
Irish Film & Television Academy	1	2
Japan Academy Prize	0	1
London Film Critics' Circle	0	4
Los Angeles Film Critics Association	1	2
Motion Picture Sound Editors	0	3
MTV Movie & TV Awards	0	1
National Board of Review	3	3
New York Film Critics Circle	0	2
New York Film Critics Online	1	1
Palm Springs International Film Festival	1	1
People's Choice Awards	0	1
Producers Guild of America Awards	1	1
Robert Awards	1	1
San Diego Film Critics Society	4	8
San Francisco Film Critics Circle	1	1
Satellite Awards	1	4
Saturn Awards	0	1
Screen Actors Guild Awards	1	2
St. Louis Film Critics Association	2	5
Teen Choice Awards	0	2
Toronto International Film Festival	0	1
USC Scripter Award	1	1
Visual Effects Society	0	1
Washington D.C. Area Film Critics Association	0	5
World Soundtrack Academy	0	1
Writers Guild of America Awards	1	1
- Total number of awards and nominations
Totals	46	128
- References

Argo is a 2012 political thriller directed by Ben Affleck, and produced by Grant Heslov, Affleck and George Clooney. The screenplay by Chris Terrio was adapted from sections of the Central Intelligence Agency (CIA) operative Tony Mendez's memoir The Master of Disguise: My Secret Life in the CIA, and the 2007 Wired article The Great Escape by Joshuah Bearman on the Canadian Caper. The film stars Affleck as Mendez, who attempts to rescue six United States diplomats from Tehran, Iran, during the 1979–81 Iran hostage crisis by pretending that they are part of a film crew scouting the country for the filming of a fictitious science-fiction film, Argo. Bryan Cranston, Alan Arkin, and John Goodman feature in supporting roles.

After successful screenings at the Telluride Film Festival, and the Toronto International Film Festival, Warner Bros. gave the film a wide release in the United States at more than 3,200 theaters on October 12, 2012. Argo grossed over $232 million at the worldwide box office on a production budget of $44.5 million. Rotten Tomatoes, a review aggregator, surveyed 348 reviews and judged 96% to be positive.

Argo garnered awards and nominations in a variety of categories, with particular praise for its direction, screenplay, and Arkin and Goodman's performance. At the 85th Academy Awards, the film received seven nominations, including Best Picture, and Best Supporting Actor for Arkin, and went on to win three awards: Best Picture, Best Adapted Screenplay for Terrio, and Best Film Editing for William Goldenberg. It became only the fourth film in Oscar history to win Best Picture without a directing nomination. (Note: The three previous films to have achieved this feat are Wings (1927), Grand Hotel (1932), and Driving Miss Daisy (1989).) Argo earned five nominations at the 70th Golden Globe Awards, winning for Best Motion Picture – Drama, and Best Director for Affleck. At the 66th British Academy Film Awards, the film received seven nominations, and won for Best Film and Best Direction.

At the 24th Producers Guild of America Awards, Argo won for Best Theatrical Motion Picture. Affleck received the Outstanding Directing – Feature Film Award from the Directors Guild of America. The cast garnered the Screen Actors Guild Award for Outstanding Performance by a Cast in a Motion Picture and Terrio's screenplay won the Writers Guild of America Award for Best Adapted Screenplay. Both the American Film Institute and the National Board of Review included the film in their annual listing of the top ten films of 2012.

== Accolades ==
Award	Date of ceremony	Category	Recipient(s)	Result	Ref(s)
AACTA Awards	January 26, 2013	Best Film – International	Ben Affleck, George Clooney, and Grant Heslov	Nominated	
AACTA Awards	January 26, 2013	Best Direction – International	Ben Affleck	Nominated	
AACTA Awards	January 26, 2013	Best Screenplay – International	Chris Terrio	Nominated	
Academy Awards	February 24, 2013	Best Picture	Ben Affleck, Grant Heslov and George Clooney	Won	
Academy Awards	February 24, 2013	Best Supporting Actor	Alan Arkin	Nominated	
Academy Awards	February 24, 2013	Best Adapted Screenplay	Chris Terrio	Won	
Academy Awards	February 24, 2013	Best Film Editing	William Goldenberg	Won	
Academy Awards	February 24, 2013	Best Original Score	Alexandre Desplat	Nominated	
Academy Awards	February 24, 2013	Best Sound Editing	Erik Aadahl and Ethan Van der Ryn	Nominated	
Academy Awards	February 24, 2013	Best Sound Mixing	John Reitz, Gregg Rudloff and José Antonio García	Nominated	
African-American Film Critics Association	December 16, 2012	Best Director	Ben Affleck	Won	
Alliance of Women Film Journalists	January 8, 2013	Best Picture	Argo	Nominated	
Alliance of Women Film Journalists	January 8, 2013	Best Director	Ben Affleck	Nominated	
Alliance of Women Film Journalists	January 8, 2013	Best Supporting Actor	Alan Arkin	Nominated	
Alliance of Women Film Journalists	January 8, 2013	Best Ensemble Cast	Argo	Nominated	
Alliance of Women Film Journalists	January 8, 2013	Best Adapted Screenplay	Chris Terrio	Won	
Alliance of Women Film Journalists	January 8, 2013	Best Film Editing	William Goldenberg	Nominated	
Alliance of Women Film Journalists	January 8, 2013	Best Film Score	Alexandre Desplat	Nominated	
Alliance of Women Film Journalists	January 8, 2013	Unforgettable Moment	"For the climatic runway chase"	Nominated	
Amanda Awards	August 16, 2013	Best Foreign Feature	Argo	Nominated	
American Cinema Editors	February 16, 2013	Best Edited Feature Film – Dramatic	William Goldenberg	Won	
American Film Institute	December 18, 2012	Top Ten Movies of the Year	Argo	Won	
Art Directors Guild	February 2, 2013	Best Production Design – Period Film	Sharon Seymour	Nominated	
Austin Film Critics Association	December 18, 2012	Best Film	Argo	2nd Place	
Austin Film Critics Association	December 18, 2012	Best Adapted Screenplay	Chris Terrio	Won	
Boston Society of Film Critics	December 9, 2012	Best Film Editing	William Goldenberg	2nd Place	
British Academy Film Awards	February 10, 2013	Best Film	Ben Affleck, George Clooney, and Grant Heslov	Won	
British Academy Film Awards	February 10, 2013	Best Director	Ben Affleck	Won	
British Academy Film Awards	February 10, 2013	Best Adapted Screenplay	Chris Terrio	Nominated	
British Academy Film Awards	February 10, 2013	Best Actor in a Leading Role	Ben Affleck	Nominated	
British Academy Film Awards	February 10, 2013	Best Actor in a Supporting Role	Alan Arkin	Nominated	
British Academy Film Awards	February 10, 2013	Best Original Music	Alexandre Desplat	Nominated	
British Academy Film Awards	February 10, 2013	Best Editing	William Goldenberg	Won	
Camerimage	December 3, 2012	Golden Frog	Rodrigo Prieto	Nominated	
Casting Society of America	November 18, 2013	Outstanding Achievement in Casting – Big Budget Feature – Drama	Lora Kennedy	Won	
César Awards	February 22, 2013	Best Foreign Film	Argo	Won	
Chicago Film Critics Association	December 17, 2012	Best Picture	Argo	Nominated	
Chicago Film Critics Association	December 17, 2012	Best Director	Ben Affleck	Nominated	
Chicago Film Critics Association	December 17, 2012	Best Original Score	Alexandre Desplat	Nominated	
Chicago Film Critics Association	December 17, 2012	Best Editing	William Goldenberg	Nominated	
Chicago Film Critics Association	December 17, 2012	Best Adapted Screenplay	Chris Terrio	Nominated	
Costume Designers Guild	February 19, 2013	Excellence in Period Film	Jacqueline West	Nominated	
Critics' Choice Movie Awards	January 10, 2013	Best Film	Argo	Won	
Critics' Choice Movie Awards	January 10, 2013	Best Supporting Actor	Alan Arkin	Nominated	
Critics' Choice Movie Awards	January 10, 2013	Best Acting Ensemble	Argo	Nominated	
Critics' Choice Movie Awards	January 10, 2013	Best Director	Ben Affleck	Won	
Critics' Choice Movie Awards	January 10, 2013	Best Adapted Screenplay	Chris Terrio	Nominated	
Critics' Choice Movie Awards	January 10, 2013	Best Editing	William Goldenberg	Nominated	
Critics' Choice Movie Awards	January 10, 2013	Best Score	Alexandre Desplat	Nominated	
Dallas–Fort Worth Film Critics Association	December 18, 2012	Best Director	Ben Affleck	3rd Place	
Dallas–Fort Worth Film Critics Association	December 18, 2012	Best Supporting Actor	Alan Arkin	4th Place	
David di Donatello	June 14, 2013	Best Foreign Film	Argo	Nominated	
Detroit Film Critics Society	December 13, 2013	Best Picture	Argo	Nominated	
Detroit Film Critics Society	December 13, 2013	Best Director	Ben Affleck	Nominated	
Detroit Film Critics Society	December 13, 2013	Best Ensemble	Argo	Nominated	
Directors Guild of America Awards	February 2, 2013	Outstanding Directing – Feature Film	Ben Affleck	Won	
Dorian Awards	January 18, 2013	Film of the Year	Argo	Won	
Empire Awards	March 24, 2013	Best Thriller	Argo	Nominated	
Florida Film Critics Circle	December 18, 2012	Best Film	Argo	Won	
Florida Film Critics Circle	December 18, 2012	Best Director	Ben Affleck	Won	
Florida Film Critics Circle	December 18, 2012	Best Adapted Screenplay	Chris Terrio	Won	
Golden Eagle Award	January 29, 2014	Best Foreign Language Film	Argo	Nominated	
Golden Globe Awards	January 13, 2013	Best Motion Picture – Drama	Argo	Won	
Golden Globe Awards	January 13, 2013	Best Performance by an Actor in a Supporting Role	Alan Arkin	Nominated	
Golden Globe Awards	January 13, 2013	Best Director – Motion Picture	Ben Affleck	Won	
Golden Globe Awards	January 13, 2013	Best Screenplay – Motion Picture	Chris Terrio	Nominated	
Golden Globe Awards	January 13, 2013	Best Original Score – Motion Picture	Alexandre Desplat	Nominated	
Grammy Awards	January 26, 2014	Best Score Soundtrack for Visual Media	Alexandre Desplat	Nominated	
Golden Raspberry Awards	February 21, 2015	Razzie Redeemer Award	Ben Affleck	Won	
Hochi Film Award	December 18, 2012	Best International Picture	Argo	Won	
Hollywood Film Festival	October 22, 2012	Ensemble of the Year	Argo	Won	
Houston Film Critics Society	January 5, 2013	Best Picture	Argo	Won	
Houston Film Critics Society	January 5, 2013	Best Director	Ben Affleck	Won	
International Film Music Critics Association	February 21, 2013	Film Composer of the Year	Alexandre Desplat	Nominated	
Irish Film & Television Academy	February 9, 2013	Best International Film	Argo	Won	
Irish Film & Television Academy	February 9, 2013	Best International Actor	Ben Affleck	Nominated	
Japan Academy Prize	March 8, 2013	Best Foreign Film	Argo	Nominated	
London Film Critics' Circle	January 20, 2013	Film of the Year	Argo	Nominated	
London Film Critics' Circle	January 20, 2013	Supporting Actor of the Year	Alan Arkin	Nominated	
London Film Critics' Circle	January 20, 2013	Screenwriter of the Year	Chris Terrio	Nominated	
London Film Critics' Circle	January 20, 2013	Technical Achievement	William Goldenberg (film editing)	Nominated	
Los Angeles Film Critics Association	December 9, 2012	Best Screenplay	Chris Terrio	Won	
Los Angeles Film Critics Association	December 9, 2012	Best Editing	William Goldenberg	Runner-up	
Motion Picture Sound Editors	February 17, 2013	Best Sound Editing – Music in a Feature Film	Richard Ford and David Metzner	Nominated	
Motion Picture Sound Editors	February 17, 2013	Best Sound Editing – Dialogue and ADR in a Feature Film	Erik Aadahl, David Bach, and David V. Butler	Nominated	
Motion Picture Sound Editors	February 17, 2013	Best Sound Editing – Sound Effects and Foley in a Feature Film	Erik Aadahl, Ethan Van der Ryn, Jonathan Klein, Dan O'Connell, John T. Cucci, P.K. Hooker, and Greg ten Bosch	Nominated	
MTV Movie & TV Awards	April 14, 2013	Best Male Performance	Ben Affleck	Nominated	
National Board of Review	January 8, 2013	Top 10 Films	Argo	Won	
National Board of Review	January 8, 2013	Special Achievement in Filmmaking	Ben Affleck	Won	
National Board of Review	January 8, 2013	Spotlight Award	John Goodman	Won	
New York Film Critics Circle	December 3, 2012	Best Film	Argo	2nd Place	
New York Film Critics Circle	December 3, 2012	Best Director	Ben Affleck	3rd Place	
New York Film Critics Online	December 9, 2012	Best Ensemble Cast	Argo	Won	
Palm Springs International Film Festival	January 5, 2013	Best Ensemble Cast	Argo	Won	
People's Choice Awards	January 9, 2013	Favorite Dramatic Movie	Argo	Nominated	
Producers Guild of America Awards	January 26, 2013	Best Picture	Ben Affleck, George Clooney, and Grant Heslov	Won	
Robert Awards	February 28, 2013	Best American Film	Argo	Won	
San Diego Film Critics Society	December 11, 2012	Best Film	Argo	Won	
San Diego Film Critics Society	December 11, 2012	Best Director	Ben Affleck	Won	
San Diego Film Critics Society	December 11, 2012	Best Supporting Actor	Alan Arkin	Nominated	
San Diego Film Critics Society	December 11, 2012	Best Adapted Screenplay	Chris Terrio	Won	
San Diego Film Critics Society	December 11, 2012	Best Editing	William Goldenberg	Won	
San Diego Film Critics Society	December 11, 2012	Best Production Design	Sharon Seymour	Nominated	
San Diego Film Critics Society	December 11, 2012	Best Score	Alexandre Desplat	Nominated	
San Diego Film Critics Society	December 11, 2012	Best Ensemble Performance	Argo	Nominated	
San Francisco Film Critics Circle	December 17, 2012	Best Film Editing	William Goldenberg	Won	
Satellite Awards	December 16, 2012	Best Film	Argo	Nominated	
Satellite Awards	December 16, 2012	Best Director	Ben Affleck	Nominated	
Satellite Awards	December 16, 2012	Best Adapted Screenplay	Chris Terrio	Nominated	
Satellite Awards	December 16, 2012	Best Original Score	Alexandre Desplat	Won	
Saturn Awards	June 26, 2013	Best Horror/Thriller Film	Argo	Nominated	
Screen Actors Guild Awards	January 27, 2013	Outstanding Performance by a Male Actor in a Supporting Role	Alan Arkin	Nominated	
Screen Actors Guild Awards	January 27, 2013	Outstanding Performance by a Cast in a Motion Picture	Ben Affleck, Alan Arkin, Kerry Bishé, Kyle Chandler, Rory Cochrane, Bryan Cranston, Christopher Denham, Tate Donovan, Clea DuVall, Victor Garber, John Goodman, Scoot McNairy, and Chris Messina	Won	
St. Louis Film Critics Association	December 17, 2012	Best Film	Argo	Won	
St. Louis Film Critics Association	December 17, 2012	Best Director	Ben Affleck	Won	
St. Louis Film Critics Association	December 17, 2012	Best Supporting Actor	Alan Arkin	Nominated	
St. Louis Film Critics Association	December 17, 2012	Best Supporting Actor	John Goodman	Nominated	
St. Louis Film Critics Association	December 17, 2012	Best Adapted Screenplay	Chris Terrio	Nominated	
Teen Choice Awards	August 11, 2013	Choice Movie: Drama	Argo	Nominated	
Teen Choice Awards	August 11, 2013	Choice Movie Actor: Drama	Ben Affleck	Nominated	
Toronto International Film Festival	September 16, 2012	People's Choice Award	Ben Affleck	2nd Place	
USC Scripter Award	February 9, 2013	Best Adapted Screenplay	Chris Terrio (screenwriter), Tony Mendez (author), and Joshuah Bearman (author)	Won	
Visual Effects Society	February 5, 2013	Outstanding Supporting Visual Effects in a Feature Motion Picture	Matt Dessero, Gregory L. McMurry, Thomas J. Smith, and Michele C. Vallillo	Nominated	
Washington D.C. Area Film Critics Association	December 10, 2012	Best Film	Argo	Nominated	
Washington D.C. Area Film Critics Association	December 10, 2012	Best Director	Ben Affleck	Nominated	
Washington D.C. Area Film Critics Association	December 10, 2012	Best Supporting Actor	Alan Arkin	Nominated	
Washington D.C. Area Film Critics Association	December 10, 2012	Best Ensemble	Argo	Nominated	
Washington D.C. Area Film Critics Association	December 10, 2012	Best Adapted Screenplay	Argo	Nominated	
World Soundtrack Academy	October 19, 2013	Film Composer of the Year	Alexandre Desplat (Argo, Reality, Renoir, Rise of the Guardians, and Zero Dark Thirty)	Nominated	
Writers Guild of America Awards	February 17, 2013	Best Adapted Screenplay	Chris Terrio	Won	

== See also ==
- 2012 in film
