= Ben Affleck filmography =

List of films featuring Ben Affleck

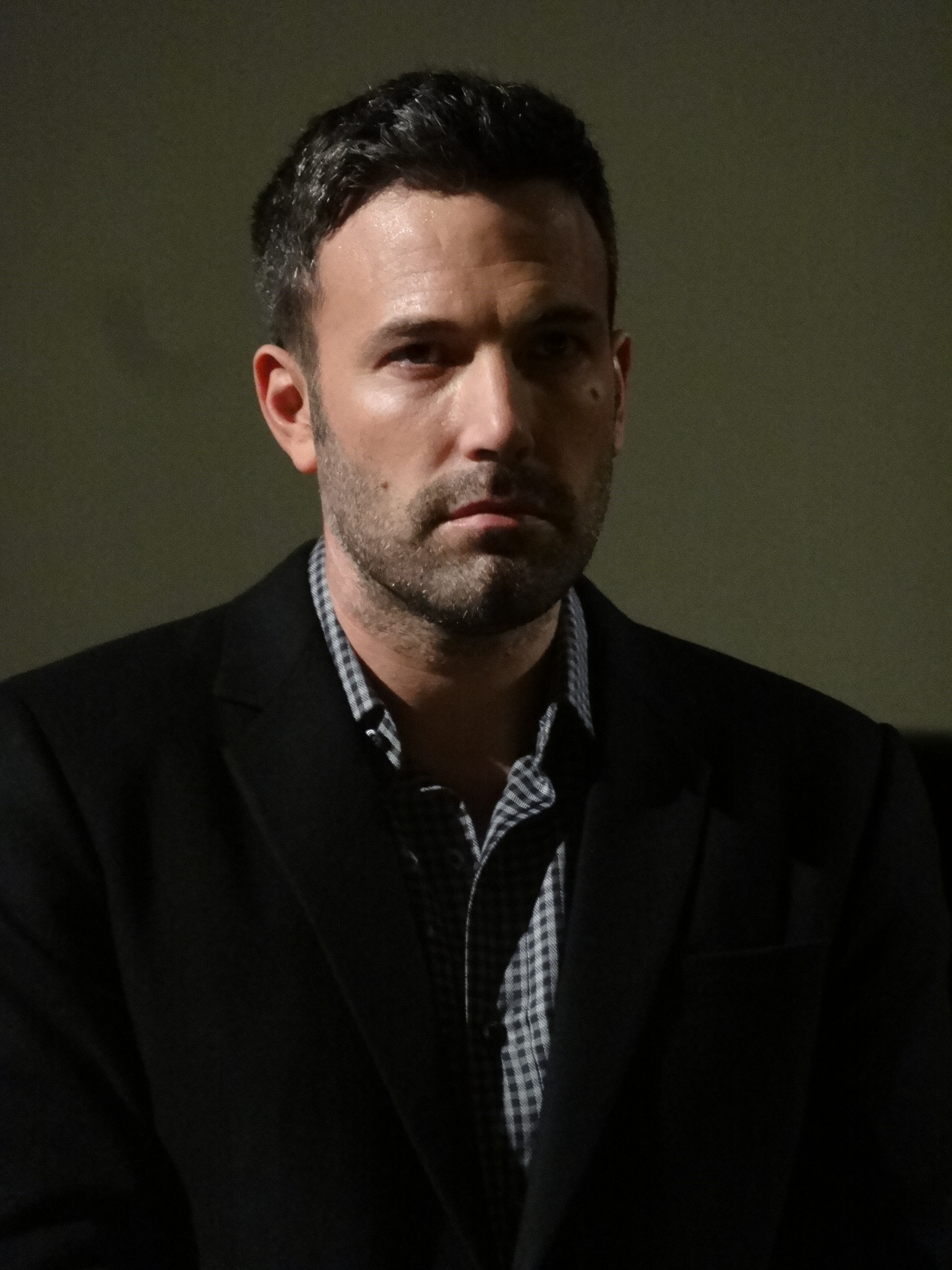
- Affleck at the premiere of his film Argo in 2012
- Film: 67
- Television film: 2
- Television series: 10
- Music videos: 3

American actor and filmmaker Ben Affleck began his career as a child, appearing in several television shows, including the PBS educational program The Voyage of the Mimi (1984). He played an antisemite in the sports film School Ties (1992) and featured as a regular on the television drama Against the Grain (1993). He gained attention for playing the supporting part of a high-school senior in Richard Linklater's cult film Dazed and Confused (1993), after which he had his first leading role in Rich Wilkes's comedy Glory Daze (1995). In 1997, Affleck played a comics artist in Smith's art-house success Chasing Amy. He co-wrote the script and starred with Matt Damon in Gus Van Sant's drama film Good Will Hunting, for which they won the Academy Award for Best Original Screenplay.

Affleck emerged a star with Michael Bay's top-grossing science fiction film Armageddon (1998). In 2000, Affleck co-formed a production company named LivePlanet, which produced Project Greenlight (2001–05, 2015), a television series that provides training to first-time filmmakers. Affleck starred in Bay's war film Pearl Harbor (2001), which despite negative reviews was a box office hit. His career subsequently went through a period of decline when he starred in a series of critical and commercial failures, including Gigli (2003). He made a comeback with the biopic Hollywoodland (2006), in which his portrayal of George Reeves earned him a Golden Globe nomination.

In 2007, Affleck made his feature film directorial debut with Gone Baby Gone, a thriller adapted by Affleck from the Dennis Lehane novel, which was critically praised. He went on to act in and direct two acclaimed features for Warner Bros.—the crime drama The Town (2010) and the thriller Argo (2012). The latter, about the 1979 Iran hostage crisis in which he played the intelligence agent Tony Mendez, won the Academy Award for Best Picture and Affleck won the Golden Globe and BAFTA for Best Director. (Note: Affleck did not receive a nomination for Best Director at the 85th Academy Awards, although Argo was nominated for, and won, Best Picture.) In 2014, Affleck played a man accused of murdering his wife in David Fincher's thriller Gone Girl. Two years later, he starred as Batman in the superhero film Batman v Superman: Dawn of Justice (2016), which grossed $873 million to rank as his highest-grossing release; he reprised the role in a few installments set in the DC Extended Universe. He subsequently gained praise for playing a recovering alcoholic in the sports drama The Way Back (2020), Peter II, Count of Alençon in the period film The Last Duel (2021), and a caring father-figure in the drama The Tender Bar (2021). Affleck returned to direction with the acclaimed sports drama Air (2023), in which he also portrayed Phil Knight.

== Film ==
Acting roles

Key
†	Denotes films that have not yet been released

Year	Title	Role	Notes	Ref.
1981	The Dark End of the Street	Tommy		
1988	The Good Mother	Extra		
1992	School Ties	Chesty Smith		
1993	Dazed and Confused	Fred O'Bannion		
1995	Glory Daze	Jack Freeman		
1995	Mallrats	Shannon Hamilton		
1997	Chasing Amy	Holden McNeil		
1997	Going All the Way	Gunner Casselman		
1997	Good Will Hunting	Chuckie Sullivan		
1998	Phantoms	Sheriff Bryce Hammond		
1998	Armageddon	A. J. Frost		
1998	Shakespeare in Love	Edward Alleyn		
1999	200 Cigarettes	Bartender		
1999	Forces of Nature	Ben Holmes		
1999	Dogma	Bartleby		
2000	Boiler Room	Jim Young		
2000	Reindeer Games	Rudy Duncan		
2000	Joseph: King of Dreams	Joseph	Voice; direct-to-video	
2000	Bounce	Buddy Amaral		
2001	Pearl Harbor	Rafe McCawley		
2001	Daddy and Them	Lawrence Bowen		
2001	Jay and Silent Bob Strike Back	Himself/Holden McNeil		
2002	Changing Lanes	Gavin Banek		
2002	The Sum of All Fears	Jack Ryan		
2002	The Third Wheel	Michael		
2003	Daredevil	Matt Murdock/Daredevil		
2003	Gigli	Larry Gigli		
2003	Paycheck	Michael Jennings		
2004	Fahrenheit 9/11	Himself	Documentary	
2004	Jersey Girl	Ollie Trinke		
2004	Surviving Christmas	Drew Latham		
2005	Elektra	Matt Murdock/Daredevil	Director's cut only	
2006	Man About Town	Jack Giamoro		
2006	Clerks II	Gawking Guy	Cameo	
2006	Hollywoodland	George Reeves		
2006	Smokin' Aces	Jack Dupree		
2009	He's Just Not That Into You	Neil		
2009	State of Play	Stephen Collins		
2009	Extract	Dean		
2010	The Town	Douglas "Doug" MacRay		
2011	The Company Men	Bobby Walker		
2012	Argo	Tony Mendez		
2012	To the Wonder	Neil		
2013	Runner Runner	Ivan Block		
2014	Gone Girl	Nick Dunne		
2016	Batman v Superman: Dawn of Justice	Bruce Wayne/Batman		
2016	The Accountant	Christian Wolff		
2016	Live by Night	Joe Coughlin		
2017	Justice League	Bruce Wayne/Batman		
2019	Triple Frontier	Tom "Redfly" Davis		
2019	Jay and Silent Bob Reboot	Holden McNeil	Cameo	
2020	The Last Thing He Wanted	Treat Morrison		
2020	The Way Back	Jack Cunningham		
2021	Zack Snyder's Justice League	Bruce Wayne/Batman	Director's cut of Justice League	
2021	The Last Duel	Count Peter of Alençon		
2021	The Tender Bar	Uncle Charlie		
2022	Deep Water	Vic Van Allen		
2022	Jennifer Lopez: Halftime	Himself	Documentary	
2022	Clerks III	Boston John	Cameo	
2023	Hypnotic	Daniel Rourke		
2023	Air	Phil Knight		
2023	The Flash	Bruce Wayne/Batman		
2024	This Is Me... Now: A Love Story	Rex Stone/Biker		
2024	The Greatest Love Story Never Told	Himself	Documentary	
2025	The Accountant 2	Christian Wolff		
2026	The Rip	JD Byrne		
2026	Animals	Mark Kimball		

=== Filmmaking credits ===
Feature film

Year	Title	Director	Writer	Producer	Ref.
1997	Good Will Hunting	No	Yes	No	
2002	Stolen Summer	No	No	Yes	
2007	Gone Baby Gone	Yes	Yes	No	
2010	The Town	Yes	Yes	No	
2012	Argo	Yes	No	Yes	
2016	Live By Night	Yes	Yes	Yes	
2021	The Last Duel	No	Yes	Yes	
2023	Air	Yes	No	Yes	
2023	Kiss the Future	No	No	Yes	
2024	The Instigators	No	No	Yes	
2024	Unstoppable	No	No	Yes	
2025	The Accountant 2	No	No	Yes	
2026	Animals	Yes	Yes	Yes	
TBA	Shot in the Dark	No	No	Yes	

Executive producer

- The Third Wheel (2002)
- Speakeasy (2002)
- The Battle of Shaker Heights (2002)
- Feast (2005)
- Reporter (2009) (Documentary)
- Bending the Arc (2017) (Documentary)
- Justice League (2017)
- Zack Snyder's Justice League (2021)
- Small Things Like These (2024)
- Kiss of the Spider Woman (2025)
- Turbulence: The Greatest Mind in Formula One (TBA)
- Flash Before the Bang (TBA)

Short film

Year	Title	Director	Producer	Ref.
1993	I Killed My Lesbian Wife, Hung Her on a Meat Hook, and Now I Have a Three-Picture Deal at Disney	Yes	No	
2008	Gimme Shelter (Documentary)	Yes	No	
2023	For People In Trouble	No	Yes	

== Television ==
Year	Title	Role	Notes	Ref.
1984	The Voyage of the Mimi	C.T. Granville	6 episodes	
1986	ABC Afterschool Special	Danny Coleman	Episode: "Wanted: The Perfect Guy"	
1987	Hands of a Stranger	Billy Hearn	Television film	
1988	The Second Voyage of the Mimi	C.T. Granville	12 episodes	
1991	Daddy	Ben Watson	Television film	
1993	The Torkelsons	Kevin Johnson	Episode: "Is That All There Is?"	
1993	Against the Grain	Joe Willie Clemons	8 episodes	
1994	Lifestories: Families in Crisis	Aaron Henry	Episode: "A Body to Die For: The Aaron Henry Story"	
2000–2013	Saturday Night Live	Himself	7 episodes	
2001–2005, 2015	Project Greenlight	Himself	15 episodes	
2008	Curb Your Enthusiasm	Customer	Episode: "Officer Krupke"	
2024	The Roast of Tom Brady	Himself	Netflix comedy special	

As producer

Year	Title	Notes	Ref.
2001–2005, 2015	Project Greenlight	Executive producer	
2002	Push, Nevada	Executive producer and writer 2 episodes	
2015	The Leisure Class	Television film; executive producer	
2016	The Runner	Executive producer	
2016	Incorporated	Executive producer	
2019–2022	City on a Hill	Executive producer and story concept	
2024	We Were the Lucky Ones	Executive producer	

== Music videos ==
Year	Title	Role	Performer	Ref.
2002	"Jenny from the Block"	Himself	Jennifer Lopez	
2020	"Antes Que El Mundo Se Acabe"	Himself	Residente	
2022	"Marry Me (Ballad)"	Himself	Jennifer Lopez, Maluma	

== See also ==
- Ben Affleck's unrealized projects
- List of awards and nominations received by Ben Affleck
