= Global Philanthropy Forum =

World Affairs Council project and network

The Global Philanthropy Forum
- Formation: 2001
- Founder: Jane Wales
- Type: Philanthropy, Impact investing
- Headquarters: California, United States
- Website: philanthropyforum.org/

The Global Philanthropy Forum (GPF) is an initiative of the World Affairs Council which acts as a peer-learning network of philanthropists — grant-makers and social investors — committed to advancing equity and opportunity in the developing world. Its community of donors and social investors work on international causes through strategic philanthropy, operating on principles that overlap with those of impact investing.

Launched in 2001 by President and co-founder Jane Wales in partnership with leading Silicon Valley philanthropists, the forum has been the first of its kind that brings together philanthropists interested in funding projects intended to have a global impact. Its members believe that individuals are not only capable of advancing human security, environmental stewardship, and improved quality of life, but that they must.

The history of the GPF suggests that groups of such investors are willing to take risks that most entrepreneurs and companies cannot. For example, while continental Africa, as a whole, is gaining more investment, a newly created Africa Philanthropy Forum based in the GPF model will be guided by a core cadre of philanthropists dedicated to the APF's goals of creating further investment and development opportunities for Africa's future.

"This work is not for sissies," said Acumen Fund founder Jacqueline Novogratz in reference to the work that GPF members do in philanthropy and impact investing. The problems GPF tackles in health, environment, education and poverty are ubiquitous and persistent. These are incredibly complex problems requiring profound patience coupled with ingenuity in the way resources are mobilized to solve them.

The GPF holds an annual international conference, which is invitation only and open to philanthropists, family foundations, senior staff of larger-staffed foundations, and social investors. GPF connects donors to issues, effective strategies, potential co-funding partners and to agents of change from around the world. Notable GPF Conference speakers have included Archbishop Desmond Tutu, Jordan's Queen Rania, Peruvian economist Hernando de Soto; Nobel Laureates Wangari Maathai and Muhammad Yunus, Google co-founders Larry Page and Sergey Brin; former prime minister Tony Blair and US Secretary of State Hillary Clinton; Bill and Melinda Gates Foundation President, Jeff Raikes; Rockefeller Foundation President Judith Rodin; and Ford Foundation President Luis Ubiñas; entrepreneurs and philanthropists Steve and Jean Case; Nigeria's Tony Elumelu; former Chilean President Michelle Bachelet
