= Ben Affleck =

American actor and filmmaker (born 1972)

- Affleck in 2026
- Born: Benjamin Geza Affleck-Boldt (Note: Naming laws in California do not allow special letters with accents (é).); August 15, 1972 (age 54); Berkeley, California, U.S.
- Occupations: Actor; film director; producer; screenwriter
- Years active: 1981–present
- Works: Full list
- Spouses: Jennifer Garner (m. 2005; div. 2018); Jennifer Lopez (m. 2022; div. 2025)
- Children: 3, including Violet
- Relatives: Casey Affleck (brother)
- Awards: Full list

Benjamin Géza Affleck (Note: Affleck was born with the surname Affleck-Boldt but has since removed Boldt from his official surname.) (born August 15, 1972) is an American actor and filmmaker. His accolades include two Academy Awards, two BAFTA Awards, and three Golden Globes. Affleck began his career as a child when he starred in the PBS educational series The Voyage of the Mimi (1984–1988). He later appeared in the independent comedy Dazed and Confused (1993) and several Kevin Smith comedies, including Mallrats (1995), Chasing Amy (1997), and Dogma (1999).

Affleck gained wider recognition when he and Matt Damon won the Academy Award for Best Original Screenplay for writing Good Will Hunting (1997), which they also starred in. He established himself as a leading man in studio films, including the disaster film Armageddon (1998), the action crime thriller Reindeer Games (2000), the war drama Pearl Harbor (2001), and the thriller The Sum of All Fears (2002). After a career downturn, Affleck made a comeback by portraying George Reeves in the biopic Hollywoodland (2006), winning the Volpi Cup for Best Actor.

His directorial debut, Gone Baby Gone (2007), which he also co-wrote, was well received. He then directed and starred in the crime drama The Town (2010) and the political thriller Argo (2012), both of which were critical and commercial successes. For the latter, Affleck won the BAFTA Award for Best Director, and the BAFTA and Academy Award for Best Picture. Affleck then starred in the psychological thriller Gone Girl (2014) and played the superhero Batman in the DC Extended Universe (2016–2023). He starred in the thriller The Accountant (2016) and the sports drama The Way Back (2020). Affleck had supporting roles in the dramas The Last Duel (2021), The Tender Bar (2021) and Air (2023), the third of which he also directed.

Affleck is the co-founder of the Eastern Congo Initiative, a grantmaking and advocacy-based nonprofit organization. He is a supporter of the Democratic Party. Affleck and Damon are co-owners of the production company Artists Equity and were also co-owners of Pearl Street Films.

== Early life ==
Affleck was born Benjamin Géza Affleck-Boldt on August 15, 1972, in Berkeley, California. His family moved to Massachusetts when he was three, living in Falmouth, where his brother Casey was born, before settling in Cambridge. His mother, Christopher Anne "Chris" Boldt, was a Harvard-educated elementary school teacher. His father, Timothy Byers Affleck, was an aspiring playwright who was "mostly unemployed". Ben's father worked sporadically as a carpenter, auto mechanic, bookie, electrician, bartender, and janitor at Harvard. In the mid-1960s, he had been an actor and stage manager with the Theater Company of Boston.

During Affleck's childhood, his father had a self-described "severe, chronic problem with alcoholism", and Affleck has recalled him drinking "all day ... every day". His father was "very difficult", and Affleck felt a sense of "relief" at the age of 11 when his parents divorced, and his father exited the family home. His father continued to drink heavily and eventually became homeless, spending two years living on the streets of Cambridge. When Affleck was 16, his father entered a rehabilitation facility in Indio, California. He lived at the facility for 12 years to maintain his sobriety and worked there as an addiction counselor.

Affleck was raised in a politically active, liberal household. He and his brother, Casey, were surrounded by people who worked in the arts; the boys regularly attended theater performances with their mother and were encouraged to make their own home movies. David Wheeler, a family friend, later remembered Affleck as a "very bright and intensely curious" child. The brothers auditioned for roles in local commercials and film productions because of their mother's friendship with a Cambridge-area casting director, and Affleck first acted professionally at the age of seven. His mother saved his wages in a college trust fund and hoped her son would ultimately become a teacher, worrying that acting was an insecure and "frivolous" profession. When Affleck was 13, he filmed a children's television program in Mexico. He learned to speak Spanish during a year spent traveling around the country with his mother and brother.

As a Cambridge Rindge and Latin high school student, Affleck acted in theater productions and was inspired by drama teacher Gerry Speca. He became close friends with fellow student Matt Damon, whom he had known since the age of eight. Although Damon was two years older, the pair had "identical interests" and both wanted to pursue acting careers. They traveled to New York together for acting auditions and saved money for train and airline tickets in a joint bank account. While Affleck had high SAT scores, he was largely an unfocused student with poor attendance. He spent a few months studying Spanish at the University of Vermont, chosen because of its proximity to his then-girlfriend, but he left after fracturing his hip while playing basketball. At 18, Affleck moved to Los Angeles, studying Middle Eastern affairs at Occidental College for a year and a half.

== Career ==
=== 1981–1997: Child acting and Good Will Hunting ===
Affleck acted professionally throughout his childhood but, in his own words, "not in the sense that I had a mom that wanted to take me to Hollywood or a family that wanted to make money from me ... I kind of chanced into something." He first appeared, at the age of seven, in an independent film, The Dark End of the Street (1981), directed by a family friend. His biggest success as a child actor was as the star of the PBS children's series The Voyage of the Mimi (1984) and The Second Voyage of the Mimi (1988), produced for sixth-grade science classes. Affleck worked "sporadically" on Mimi from the age of eight to fifteen in both Massachusetts and Mexico. As a teenager, he appeared in the ABC after school special Wanted: A Perfect Man (1986), the television film Hands of a Stranger (1987), and a 1989 Burger King commercial.

After high school, Affleck moved briefly to New York in search of acting work. Later, while studying at Occidental College in Los Angeles, Affleck directed student films. As an actor, he had a series of "knock-around parts, one to the next". He played Patrick Duffy's son in the television film Daddy (1991), made an uncredited appearance as a basketball player in the Buffy the Vampire Slayer film (1992), and had a supporting role as a prep school student in School Ties (1992). He played a high school quarterback in the NBC television series Against the Grain (1993), and a steroid-abusing high school football player in Body to Die For: The Aaron Henry Story (1994). Affleck's most notable role during this period was as a high school bully in Richard Linklater's cult classic Dazed and Confused (1993). Linklater wanted a likable actor for the villainous role, and, while Affleck was "big and imposing", he was "so smart and full of life ... I just liked him." Affleck later said Linklater was instrumental in demystifying the filmmaking process for him.

Affleck's first starring film role was as an aimless art student in the college drama Glory Daze (1995), with Stephen Holden of The New York Times remarking that his "affably mopey performance finds just the right balance between obnoxious and sad sack". He then played a bully in filmmaker Kevin Smith's comedy Mallrats (1995) and became friends with Smith during the filming. Affleck had begun to worry that he would be relegated to a career of "throwing people into their lockers", but Smith wrote him a lead role in the romantic comedy Chasing Amy (1997). The film was Affleck's breakthrough. Janet Maslin of The New York Times praised Affleck's "wonderful ease" playing the role, combining "suave good looks with cool comic timing". Owen Gleiberman of Entertainment Weekly described it as a "wholesome and quick-witted" performance. When Affleck starred as a recently returned Korean War veteran in the coming-of-age drama Going All the Way (1997), Todd McCarthy of Variety found him "excellent", while Janet Maslin of The New York Times noted that his "flair for comic self-doubt made a strong impression."

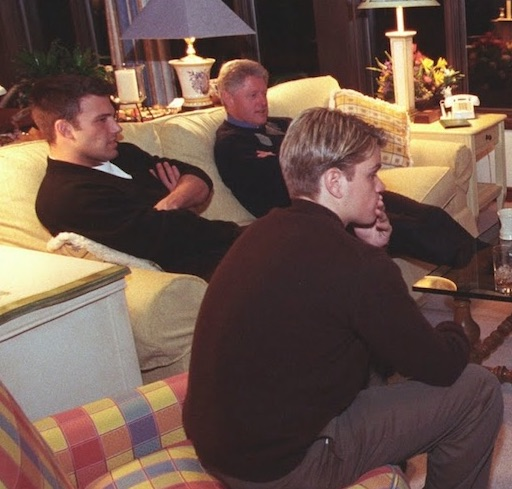
Affleck and Matt Damon attend a Camp David screening of Good Will Hunting with President Bill Clinton in January 1998.

The success of 1997's Good Will Hunting, which Affleck co-wrote and acted in, marked a turning point in his career. The screenplay originated in 1992 when Damon wrote a 40-page script for a playwriting class at Harvard University. He asked Affleck to act out the scenes with him in front of the class and, when Damon later moved into Affleck's Los Angeles apartment, they began working on the script in earnest. The film, which they wrote mainly during improvisation sessions, was set partly in their hometown of Cambridge and drew from their own experiences. The screenplay was borne of their desire to create "an acting reel" for themselves. They sold the screenplay to Castle Rock in 1994 when Affleck was 22 years old. During the development process, they received notes from industry figures, including Rob Reiner and William Goldman. Following a lengthy dispute with Castle Rock about a suitable director, Affleck and Damon persuaded Miramax to purchase the screenplay. The two friends moved back to Boston for a year before the film finally went into production, directed by Gus Van Sant, and co-starring Damon, Affleck, Minnie Driver, and Robin Williams.

On its release, Janet Maslin of The New York Times praised the "smart and touching screenplay", while Emanuel Levy of Variety found it "funny, nonchalant, moving and angry". Jay Carr of The Boston Globe wrote that Affleck brought "a beautifully nuanced tenderness" to his role as the working-class friend of Damon's mathematical prodigy character. Affleck and Damon eventually won the Academy Award for Best Original Screenplay. Affleck has described this period of his life as "dreamlike": "It was like one of those scenes in an old movie when a newspaper comes spinning out of the black on to the screen. You know, '$100 Million Box Office! Awards!'" He remains the youngest writer (at age 25) ever to win an Oscar for screenwriting.

=== 1998–2002: Leading man status ===
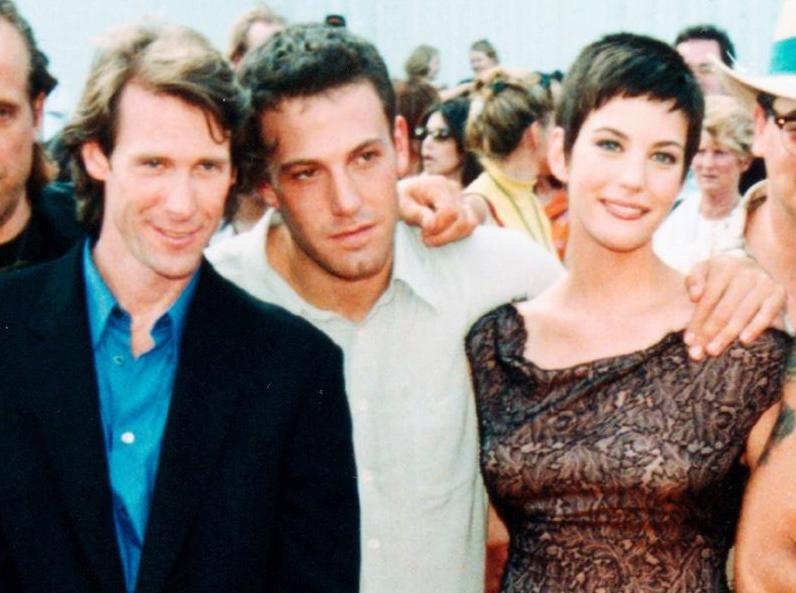
Affleck with Michael Bay and Liv Tyler at the Armageddon premiere in June 1998

Armageddon, released in 1998, established Affleck as a viable leading man for Hollywood studio films. Good Will Hunting had not yet been released during the casting process and, after Affleck's screen test, director Michael Bay dismissed him as “a geek". Producer Jerry Bruckheimer convinced Bay that Affleck would be a star, but he was required to lose weight, become tanned, and get his teeth capped before filming began. The film, where he starred opposite Bruce Willis as a blue-collar driller tasked by NASA with stopping an asteroid from colliding with Earth, was a box office success. Daphne Merkin of The New Yorker remarked: "Affleck demonstrates a sexy Paul Newmanish charm and is clearly bound for stardom."

Later in 1998, Affleck had a supporting role as an arrogant English actor in the period romantic comedy Shakespeare in Love, starring his then-girlfriend Gwyneth Paltrow. Lael Loewenstein of Variety remarked that Affleck "does some of his very best work, suggesting that comedy may be his true calling," while Janet Maslin of The New York Times found him "very funny". Shakespeare in Love won seven Academy Awards, including Best Picture, while the cast won the Screen Actors Guild Award for Outstanding Performance by a Cast. Affleck then appeared as a small-town sheriff in the supernatural horror film Phantoms. Stephen Holden of The New York Times wondered why actors like Affleck and Peter O'Toole had agreed to appear in the "junky" film: "Affleck's thudding performance suggests he is reading his dialogue for the first time, directly from cue cards."

Affleck and Damon had an on-screen reunion in Kevin Smith's religious satire Dogma, which premiered at the 1999 Cannes Film Festival. Janet Maslin of The New York Times remarked that the pair, playing fallen angels, "bring great, understandable enthusiasm to Mr. Smith's smart talk and wild imaginings". Affleck starred opposite Sandra Bullock in the romantic comedy Forces of Nature (1999), playing a groom whose attempts to get to his wedding are complicated by his free-spirited traveling companion. Joe Leydon of Variety praised "his winning ability to play against his good looks in a self-effacing comic turn." Affleck then appeared opposite Courtney Love in the little-seen ensemble comedy 200 Cigarettes (1999).

Interested in a directorial career, Affleck shadowed John Frankenheimer throughout pre-production of the action thriller Reindeer Games (2000). Frankenheimer, directing his last feature film, described Affleck as having "a very winning, likable quality about him. I've been doing this for a long time and he's really one of the nicest." He starred opposite Charlize Theron as a hardened criminal, with Elvis Mitchell of The New York Times enjoying the unexpected casting choice: "Affleck often suggests one of the Kennedys playing Clark Kent ... He looks as if he has never missed a party or a night's sleep. He's game, though, and his slight dislocation works to the advantage of Reindeer Games." He then had a supporting role as a ruthless stockbroker in the crime drama Boiler Room (2000). A.O. Scott of The New York Times felt Affleck had merely "traced over" Alec Baldwin's performance in Glengarry Glen Ross, while Peter Rainer of New York Magazine said he "does a series of riffs on Baldwin's aria, and each one is funnier and crueler than the next". He provided the voice of Joseph in the animated Joseph: King of Dreams. In his last film role of 2000, Affleck starred opposite his girlfriend Paltrow in the romantic drama Bounce. Stephen Holden of The New York Times praised the "understated intensity and exquisite detail" of his performance: "His portrait of a young, sarcastically self-defined 'people person' who isn't half as confident as he would like to appear is close to definitive."

Affleck reunited with director Michael Bay for the critically derided war drama Pearl Harbor (2001). Todd McCarthy of Variety wrote "the blandly handsome Affleck couldn't convince that he'd ever so much as been turned down for a date, much less lost the love of his life to his best friend". Affleck then parodied Good Will Hunting with Damon and Van Sant in Kevin Smith's Jay and Silent Bob Strike Back (2001), made a cameo in the comedy Daddy and Them (2001), and had a supporting role in the little-seen The Third Wheel (2002). He portrayed the CIA analyst Jack Ryan in the thriller The Sum of All Fears (2002). Stephen Holden of The New York Times felt he was miscast in a role previously played by both Harrison Ford and Alec Baldwin: "Although Mr. Affleck can be appealing when playing earnest young men groping toward maturity, he simply lacks the gravitas for the role." Affleck had an "amazing experience" making the thriller Changing Lanes (2002), and later cited Roger Michell as someone he learned from as a director. Robert Koehler of Variety described it as one of his "most thoroughly wrought" performances: "The journey into a moral fog compels him to play more inwardly and thoughtfully than he ever has before."

Affleck became more involved with television and film production in the early 2000s. He and Damon had set up Pearl Street Films in 1998, named after the street that ran between their childhood homes. Their next production company LivePlanet, co-founded in 2000 with Sean Bailey and Chris Moore, sought to integrate the Internet into mainstream television and film production. LivePlanet's biggest success was the documentary series Project Greenlight, aired on HBO and later Bravo, which focused on first-time filmmakers being given the chance to direct a feature film. Project Greenlight was nominated for the Primetime Emmy Award for Outstanding Reality Program in 2002, 2004, and 2005. Push, Nevada (2002), created, written, and produced by Affleck and Bailey, was an ABC mystery drama series that placed a viewer-participation game within the frame of the show. Caryn James of The New York Times praised the show's "nerve, imagination, and clever writing", but Robert Bianco of USA Today described it as a "knock-off" of Twin Peaks. The show was canceled by ABC after seven episodes due to low ratings. Over time, LivePlanet's focus shifted from multimedia projects to more traditional film production. Affleck and his partners signed a film production deal with Disney in 2002; it expired in 2007.

=== 2003–2005: Career downturn and tabloid notoriety ===
While Affleck had been a tabloid figure for much of his career, he was the subject of increased media attention in 2003 because of his relationship with Jennifer Lopez. By the end of the year, Affleck had become, in the words of GQ, the "world's most over-exposed actor". His tabloid fame coincided with a series of poorly received films.

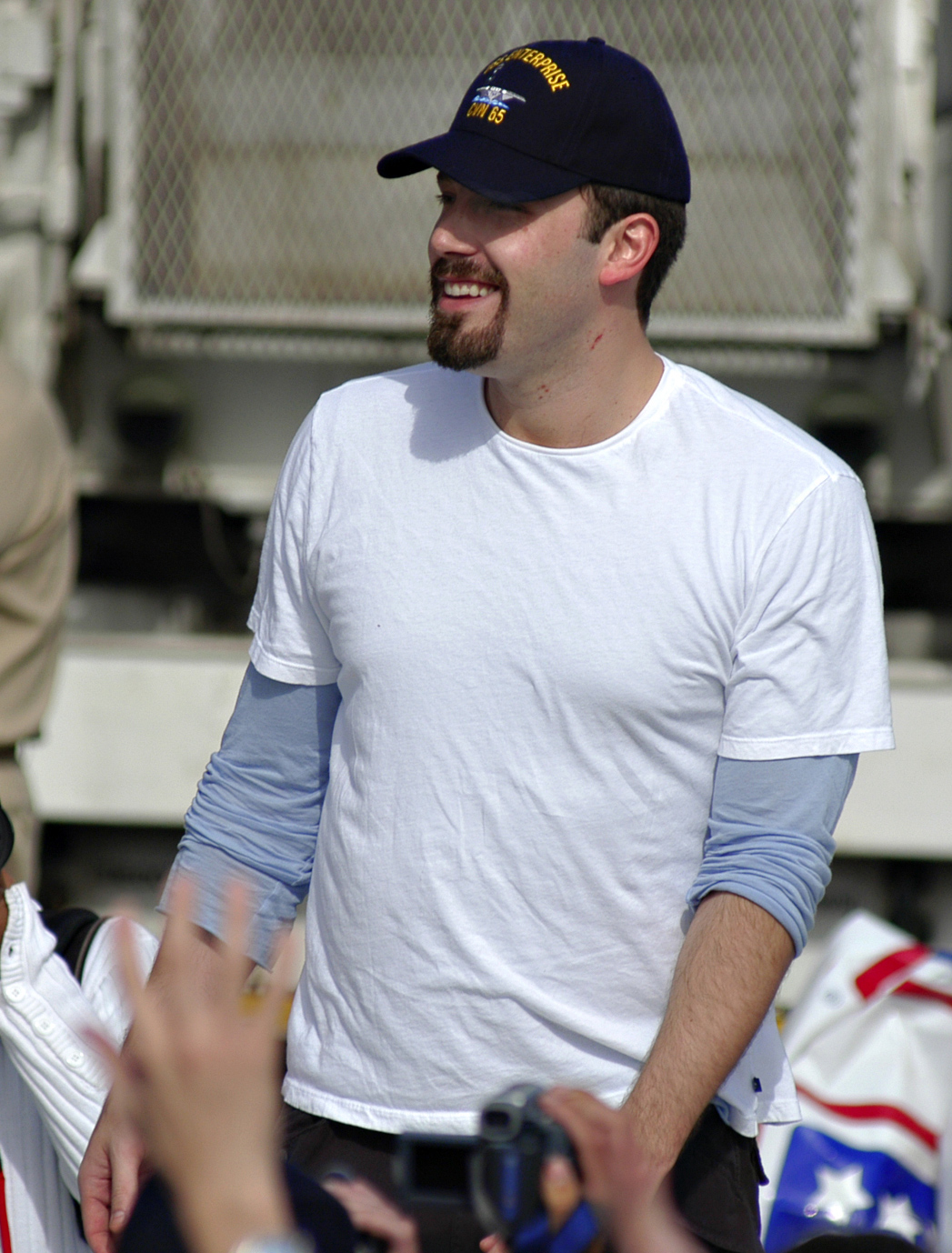
Affleck visiting US Marines in Manama, Bahrain in 2003

The first of these was Daredevil (2003), in which Affleck starred as the blind superhero. Affleck was a longtime comic book fan, and, in 1999, had written a foreword for Kevin Smith's Guardian Devil about his love for the character of Daredevil. The film was a commercial success, but received a mixed response from critics. Elvis Mitchell of The New York Times said Affleck was "lost" in the role: "Affleck is shriveled by the one-dimensional role ... [Only his scenes with Jon Favreau have] a playful side that allows Mr. Affleck to show his generosity as an actor." In 2014, Affleck described Daredevil as the only film he regretted making. He next appeared as a low-ranking mobster in the romantic comedy Gigli (2003), co-starring Lopez. The film was almost uniformly panned, with Manohla Dargis of the Los Angeles Times remarking that "Affleck doesn't have the chops or the charm to maneuver around (or past) bad material." Rex Reed of The Observer criticized the co-stars, writing that the film reminds the world how "pathetically incompetent they both are in the only two things that matter in career longevity—craft and talent." Yet Affleck has repeatedly defended director Martin Brest since the film's release, describing him as "one of the really great directors." In his last film role of 2003, Affleck starred as a reverse engineer in the sci-fi thriller Paycheck (2003). Peter Bradshaw of The Guardian remarked on Affleck's "self-deprecating charm" and wondered why he could not find better scripts. Manohla Dargis of the Los Angeles Times found it "almost unfair" to critique Affleck, given that he “had such a rough year.”

Affleck's poor critical notices continued in 2004 when he starred as a bereaved husband in the romantic comedy Jersey Girl, directed by longtime collaborator Smith. Stephen Holden of The New York Times described Affleck as an actor "whose talent has curdled as his tabloid notoriety has spread." Later that year, he starred opposite James Gandolfini in the holiday comedy Surviving Christmas. Holden noted in The New York Times that the film "found a clever way to use Ben Affleck's disagreeable qualities. The actor's shark-like grin, cocky petulance and bullying frat-boy swagger befit his character." At this point, the quality of scripts offered to Affleck "was just getting worse and worse", the negative press coverage "really started to affect" him, and he decided to take a career break. The Los Angeles Times published a piece on the downfall of Affleck's career in late 2004. The article noted that, unlike film critics and tabloid journalists, "few industry professionals seem to be gloating over Affleck's travails.”

=== 2006–2015: Emergence as a director ===
Affleck began a career comeback in 2006 with his acclaimed performance as Superman actor George Reeves in the noir biopic Hollywoodland. Peter Travers of Rolling Stone praised "an award-caliber performance ... This is feeling, nuanced work from an actor some of us had prematurely written off." Geoffrey Macnab of The Guardian said he "beautifully" captured "the character's curious mix of charm, vulnerability and fatalism". He was awarded the Volpi Cup at the Venice Film Festival and was nominated for a Golden Globe for Best Supporting Actor. Also in 2006, he made a cameo in Smith's Clerks II, starred in the little-seen Man About Town and had a minor role in the crime drama Smokin' Aces.

In 2007, Affleck made his feature film directorial debut with Gone Baby Gone, a crime drama set in a working-class Boston neighborhood, starring his brother Casey as a private investigator searching for a young abductee. Affleck co‑wrote the screenplay, based on the book by Dennis Lehane, with childhood friend Aaron Stockard, having first mentioned his intention to adapt the story in 2003. It opened to enthusiastic reviews. Manohla Dargis of The New York Times praised the film's "sensitivity to real struggle," while Stephen Farber of The Hollywood Reporter described it as "thoughtful, deeply poignant, [and] splendidly executed."

While Affleck intended to "keep a primary emphasis on directing" going forward in his career, he acted in three films in 2009. In the ensemble romantic comedy He's Just Not That Into You, the chemistry between Affleck and Jennifer Aniston was praised. Affleck played a congressman in the political thriller State of Play. Wesley Morris of The Boston Globe found him "very good in the film's silliest role," but David Edelstein of New York Magazine remarked of Affleck: "He might be smart and thoughtful in life [but] as an actor his wheels turn too slowly." He had a supporting role as a bartender in the little-seen comedy film Extract. Peter Travers of Rolling Stone described his performance as "a goofball delight", while Manohla Dargis of The New York Times declared it "a real performance". In 2010, Affleck starred in The Company Men as a mid-level sales executive who is made redundant during the 2008 financial crisis. David Denby of The New Yorker declared that Affleck "gives his best performance yet", while Richard Corliss of Time found he "nails Bobby's plunge from hubris to humiliation".

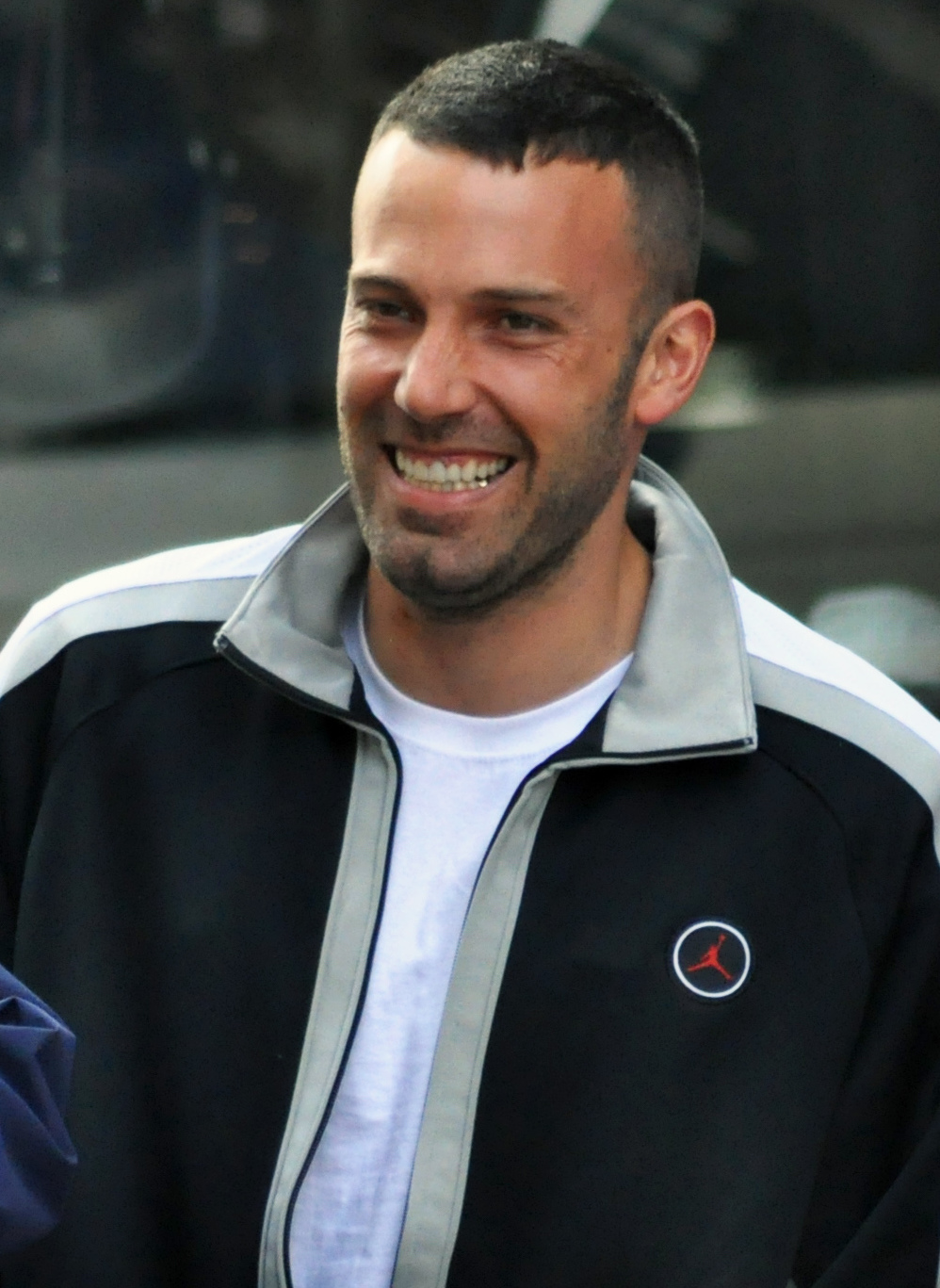
Affleck on the set of The Town in 2010

Following the modest commercial success of Gone Baby Gone, Warner Bros. developed a close working relationship with Affleck and offered him his choice of the studio's scripts. He decided to direct the crime drama The Town (2010), an adaptation of Chuck Hogan's novel Prince of Thieves. He also re-wrote the screenplay and starred in the film as a bank robber. The film became a surprise box office hit, and gained further critical acclaim for Affleck. A.O. Scott of The New York Times praised his "skill and self-confidence as a serious director," while Roger Ebert of the Chicago Sun-Times noted: "Affleck has the stuff of a real director. Everything is here. It's an effective thriller, he works closely with actors, he has a feel for pacing." Also in 2010, Affleck and Damon's production company, Pearl Street Films, signed a first-look producing deal at Warner Bros.

Affleck soon began work on his next directorial project, Argo (2012), for Warner Bros. Written by Chris Terrio and starring Affleck as a CIA operative, the film tells the story of the CIA plan to save six U.S. diplomats during the 1979 Iran hostage crisis by faking a production for a large-scale science fiction film. Anthony Lane of The New Yorker said the film offered "further proof that we were wrong about Ben Affleck". Peter Travers of Rolling Stone remarked: "Affleck takes the next step in what looks like a major directing career ... He directs the hell out of it, nailing the quickening pace, the wayward humor, the nerve-frying suspense." A major critical and commercial success, Argo won the Academy Award, Golden Globe Award, and BAFTA Award for Best Picture. The cast won the Screen Actors Guild Award for Outstanding Performance by a Cast. Affleck himself won the Golden Globe Award, Directors Guild of America Award, and BAFTA Award for Best Director, becoming the first director to win these awards without a nomination for the Academy Award for Best Director.

The following year, Affleck played a romantic lead in Terrence Malick's experimental drama To the Wonder. Malick, a close friend of Affleck's godfather, first met Affleck in the 1990s to offer advice about the plot of Good Will Hunting. Peter Bradshaw of The Guardian enjoyed "a performance of dignity and sensitivity," while The New Yorker's Richard Brody described Affleck as "a solid and muscular performer" who "conveys a sense of thoughtful and willful individuality". Affleck's performance as a poker boss was considered a highlight of the poorly reviewed thriller Runner Runner (2013). Betsy Sharkey of the Los Angeles Times remarked that it was "one killer of a character, and Affleck plays him like a Bach concerto – every note perfectly played."

He then pushed back production on his own directorial project to star as a husband accused of murder in David Fincher's psychological thriller Gone Girl (2014). Fincher cast him partly because he understood what it felt like to be misrepresented by tabloid media: "What many people don't know is that he's crazy smart, but since he doesn't want that to get awkward, he downplays it. I think he learned how to skate on charm." David Edelstein of New York Magazine noted that Fincher's controlled style of directing had a "remarkable" effect on Affleck's acting: "I never thought I'd write these words, but he carries the movie. He's terrific." Justin Chang of Variety found Affleck "perfectly cast": "It's a tricky turn, requiring a measure of careful underplaying and emotional aloofness, and he nails it completely." In 2015, Affleck and Damon's Project Greenlight was resurrected by HBO for one season.

=== 2016–2019: Batman and continued directing ===
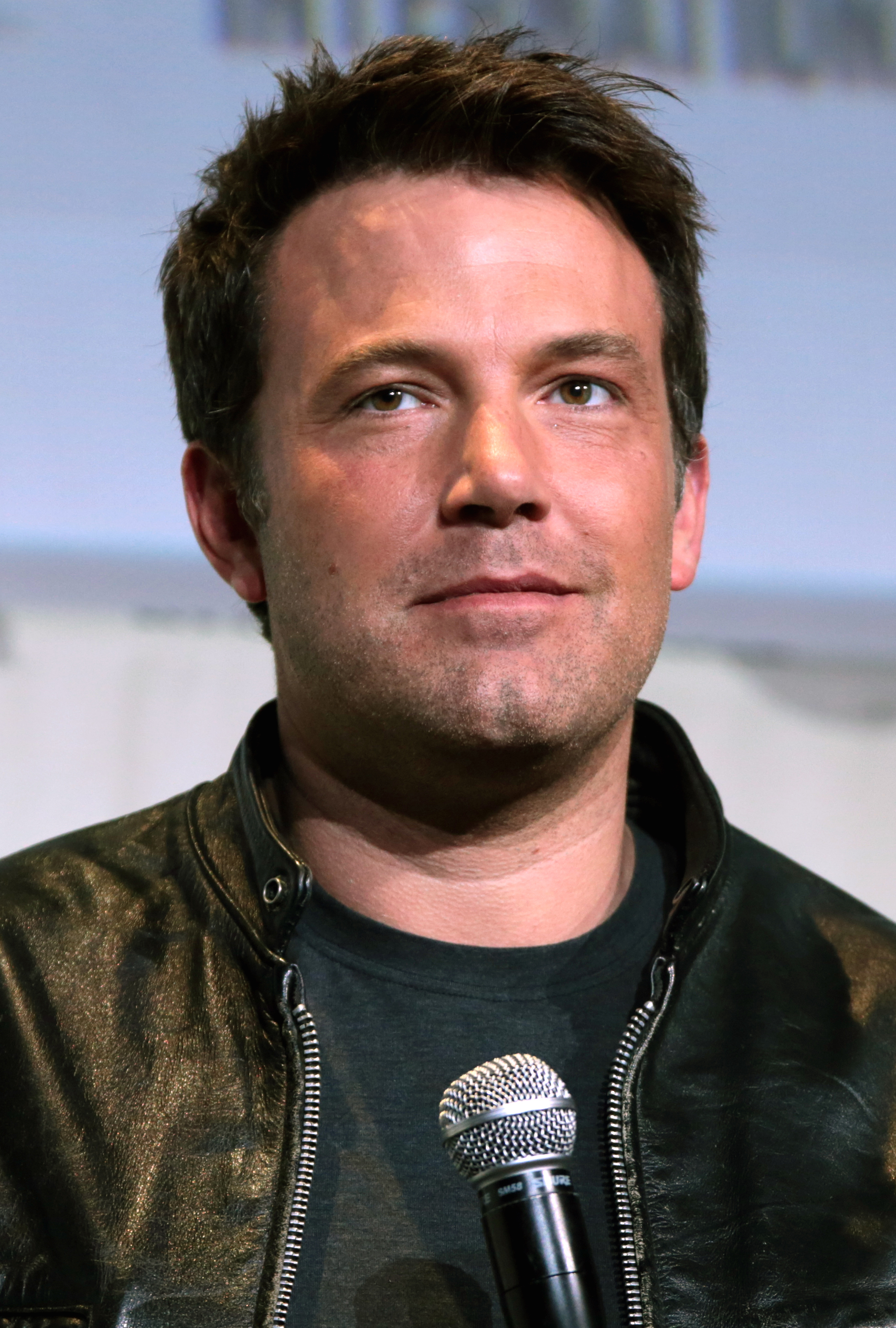
Affleck at the 2016 San Diego Comic-Con

Given Affleck's growing reputation as a filmmaker, his decision to star as Batman in the 2016 superhero film Batman v Superman: Dawn of Justice was regarded by Dave Itzkoff of The New York Times as "a somewhat bewildering choice". Affleck reprised his role as Batman later that year, making a brief cameo appearance in Suicide Squad (2016). He starred as an autistic accountant in the action thriller The Accountant (2016), which was an unexpected commercial success. Peter Debruge of Variety felt Affleck's "boy-next-door" demeanor – "so normal and non-actorly that most of his performances feel like watching one of your buddies up on screen" – was "a terrific fit" for the role. Stephen Holden of The New York Times wondered why Affleck, "looking appropriately dead-eyed and miserable," committed himself to the film.

Live by Night, which Affleck wrote, directed, co-produced, and starred in, was released in late 2016. Adapted from Dennis Lehane's novel of the same name, the Prohibition-era gangster drama received largely unenthusiastic reviews and failed to recoup its $65 million production budget. David Sims of The Atlantic described it as "a fascinating mess of a movie" and criticized Affleck's "stiff, uncomfortable" performance. He noted that one of the last action scenes "is so wonderfully staged, its action crisp and easy to follow, that it reminds you what skill Affleck has with the camera". In October 2016, Affleck and Damon made a one-off stage appearance for a live reading of the Good Will Hunting screenplay at New York's Skirball Theater. The superhero film Justice League, in which Affleck returned as Batman, was released in 2017. He later described it as a "difficult" on-set experience. Zack Snyder stepped down during filming due to the death of his daughter, the replacement director Joss Whedon's treatment of actors was the subject of complaints, and Affleck himself was struggling with addiction issues. The film drew mixed opinions from critics; Todd McCarthy of The Hollywood Reporter wrote that Affleck "looks like he'd rather be almost anywhere else but here."

Amidst an alcoholism relapse, Affleck did not work in 2017. He stepped down as director, writer and, ultimately, as the star of The Batman, saying he "couldn't crack it" and no longer felt "passionate" about the story. Filming of the drug-trafficking thriller Triple Frontier was postponed by six months in order to accommodate his treatment for "health issues". Upon Triple Frontier's release in 2019, Rodrigo Perez of The Playlist remarked that director J.C. Chandor "gets a lot of mileage out of the Sad Affleck narrative and perhaps both director and actor lean into the idea." Later in 2019, Affleck made a cameo appearance in Jay and Silent Bob Reboot, having had little contact with Kevin Smith since the making of Clerks II in 2006. Affleck played a supporting role as a diplomat in Dee Rees's political thriller The Last Thing He Wanted (2020). The Netflix movie, filmed in mid-2018, received negative reviews from critics, with Tomris Laffly of Variety describing Affleck's performance as "oddly removed".

Affleck's starring role as a recovering alcoholic in the sports drama The Way Back (2020) was widely praised. The themes of the movie were "close to home" for Affleck. He relapsed during pre-production in 2018 and the movie was shot in the days after he left rehab; Affleck agreed to put his salary in escrow and was accompanied to set by a sober coach. Richard Lawson of Vanity Fair said it was hard to avoid the movie's "meta angle": "Affleck handles his self-conscious task with a generous humility—giving a performance built not out of histrionics or big actor moments, but instead from the messy details of a man in a plateaued distress". David Sims of The Atlantic praised the "subtlety", "vulnerability" and "lumbering physicality" of his performance, describing it as "the rawest and most natural" work of his career. Due to the COVID-19 pandemic, cinemas closed in the second week of the movie's release and Warner Bros. made it available to view-on-demand earlier than scheduled. He received a Best Actor nomination at the 2021 Critics' Choice Awards. Also in 2021, Snyder's director's cut of Justice League featured a newly filmed scene with Affleck.

=== 2020–present: Supporting roles and Artists Equity ===
Affleck had supporting roles in two 2021 releases. He played Peter II, Count of Alençon, a hedonistic aristocrat in Ridley Scott's medieval drama The Last Duel; he also co-wrote the movie's screenplay with Damon and Nicole Holofcener. Bilge Ebiri of New York Magazine was impressed by Affleck's "imperious" performance as the "wonderfully skeezy Pierre, a marvelously out-there creation who shouldn't work at all and yet becomes an engine of uneasy delights." Brian Truitt of USA Today said he "steals the movie": "He seems to have written the most entertaining character in the movie for himself, but we'll allow it." Later that year, Affleck appeared as a substitute father figure in George Clooney's coming-of-age drama The Tender Bar. The film premiered at the London Film Festival, with Clooney remarking that he cast Affleck because he is "very intelligent, and he can also come off as the big goomba." Pete Hammond of Deadline described it as "a part he was born to play", writing that he "beautifully and knowingly" delivered "an unforgettable portrait of the uncle you wish you had." Kevin Maher of The Times said he played the role with "extraordinary subtly and depth": "He dominates his every scene, with deftly delivered quips, comedy reaction shots or sheer hang-dog charisma alone." For the role, Affleck was nominated for the Golden Globe Award and Screen Actors Guild Award for Best Supporting Actor.

In 2022, Affleck and Ana de Armas starred in Adrian Lyne's thriller Deep Water, an adaptation of Patricia Highsmith's novel. It was released on streaming service Hulu and received largely negative reviews. Justin Chang of the Los Angeles Times said Affleck "excels at playing the emasculated dreamboat, the golden boy gone to seed." Adam Nayman of The Ringer said the film "serves as an example of his formidable skill set within a very specific range": "What used to seem like the callow cockiness of a handsome front-runner has hardened—and deepened—into a kind of grizzled charisma, the gravitas of a frat boy facing down his own expiration date." He also made a cameo appearance in Smith's Clerks III.

Affleck's fifth directorial project, Air, about Nike's creation of the Air Jordan, premiered in 2023 and was well-reviewed. The movie starred Matt Damon and Viola Davis, with Affleck playing a supporting role as Phil Knight. It marked the first release from Affleck and Damon's independent production company Artists Equity, which aims to share profits with all stakeholders. Affleck serves as the company's CEO and intends to work exclusively for Artists Equity as a filmmaker. In a review of Air for The Ringer, Adam Nayman wrote that Affleck, while not a "masterful" filmmaker, "has a gift for pacing and working with actors ... He and Damon spend most of the time pumping each other up, and the chemistry between them is undeniable." David Sims of The Atlantic said Air was "a great return to Affleck's original impulses as a director: It's a fun, well-made film for grown-ups that gives its actors room to flesh out their characters." Also in 2023, Affleck starred as a detective in Robert Rodriguez's action thriller Hypnotic and made his final appearance as Batman in the film The Flash, appearing in a cameo.

In 2025, Affleck starred in the action thriller The Accountant 2. In January 2026, he alongside Damon starred in the crime thriller The Rip. He also directed and starred opposite Gillian Anderson in the kidnapping thriller Animals, which was debuted on Netflix on October 9, 2026.

In March 2026, Netflix acquired Affleck's AI-focused post-production startup, InterPositive, for an estimated $600 million, at which time he joined the company as a senior advisor to oversee the technology's integration.

== Philanthropy ==
=== Eastern Congo Initiative ===
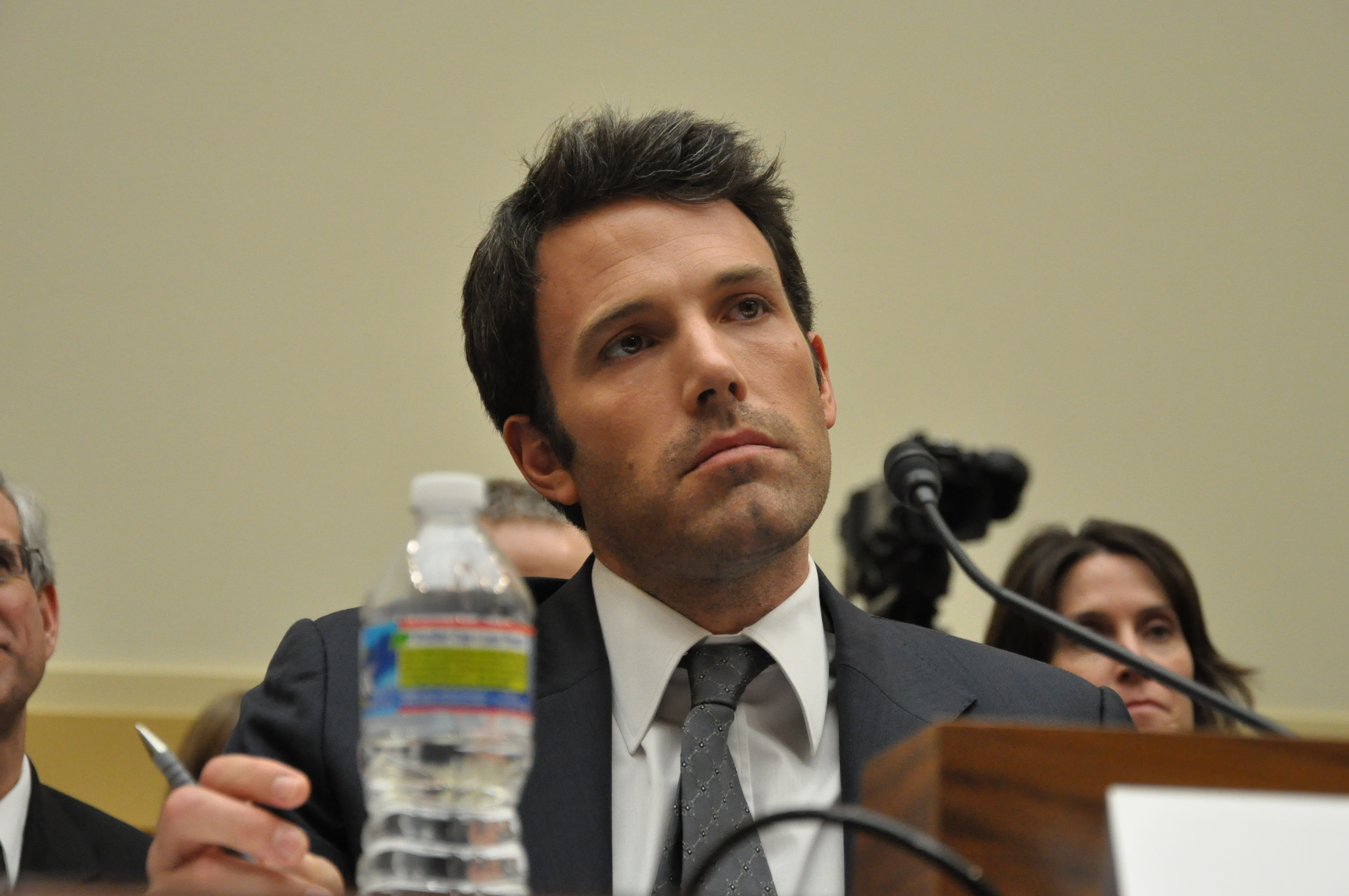
Affleck in 2011, testifying before the House Subcommittee on Africa, Global Health and Human Rights

After traveling in the region between 2007 and early 2010, Affleck and Whitney Williams co-founded the nonprofit organization Eastern Congo Initiative in 2010. ECI acts as a grant maker for Congolese-led, community-based charities. It offers training and resources to cooperatives of Congolese farmers while leveraging partnerships with companies including Theo Chocolate and Starbucks. ECI also aims to raise public awareness and drive policy change in the United States.

Affleck has written op-eds about issues facing eastern Congo for the Washington Post, Politico, the Huffington Post, Time, The New York Times and the Los Angeles Times. He has appeared as a discussion panelist at many events, including at the Center for Strategic and International Studies, the Global Philanthropy Forum, and the Clinton Global Initiative. During visits to Washington D.C., Affleck has testified before the House Subcommittee on Africa, Global Health and Human Rights, the House Armed Services Committee, the Senate Foreign Relations Committee, and the Senate Appropriations Subcommittee on State, Foreign Operations, and Related Projects.

=== Other charitable causes ===
Affleck is a supporter of the A-T Children's Project. While filming Forces of Nature in 1998, Affleck befriended ten-year-old Joe Kindregan (1988–2015), who had the rare disease ataxia-telangiectasia (A-T), and his family. He became actively involved in fundraising for A-T, and he and Kindregan testified before the House Appropriations Subcommittee on Labor, Health & Human Services, and Education in 2001, asking senators to support stem-cell research and to double the budget of the National Institutes of Health. In 2007, Affleck was the keynote speaker at Kindregan's high school graduation ceremony in Fairfax, Virginia. Kindregan appeared as an extra in Argo (2012). In 2013, in celebration of Kindregan's 25th birthday and "15 years of friendship with Joe and his family," Affleck and Garner matched donations made to the A-T Children's Project. Affleck appeared in CinemAbility (2013), a documentary film which explores Hollywood's portrayals of people with disabilities.

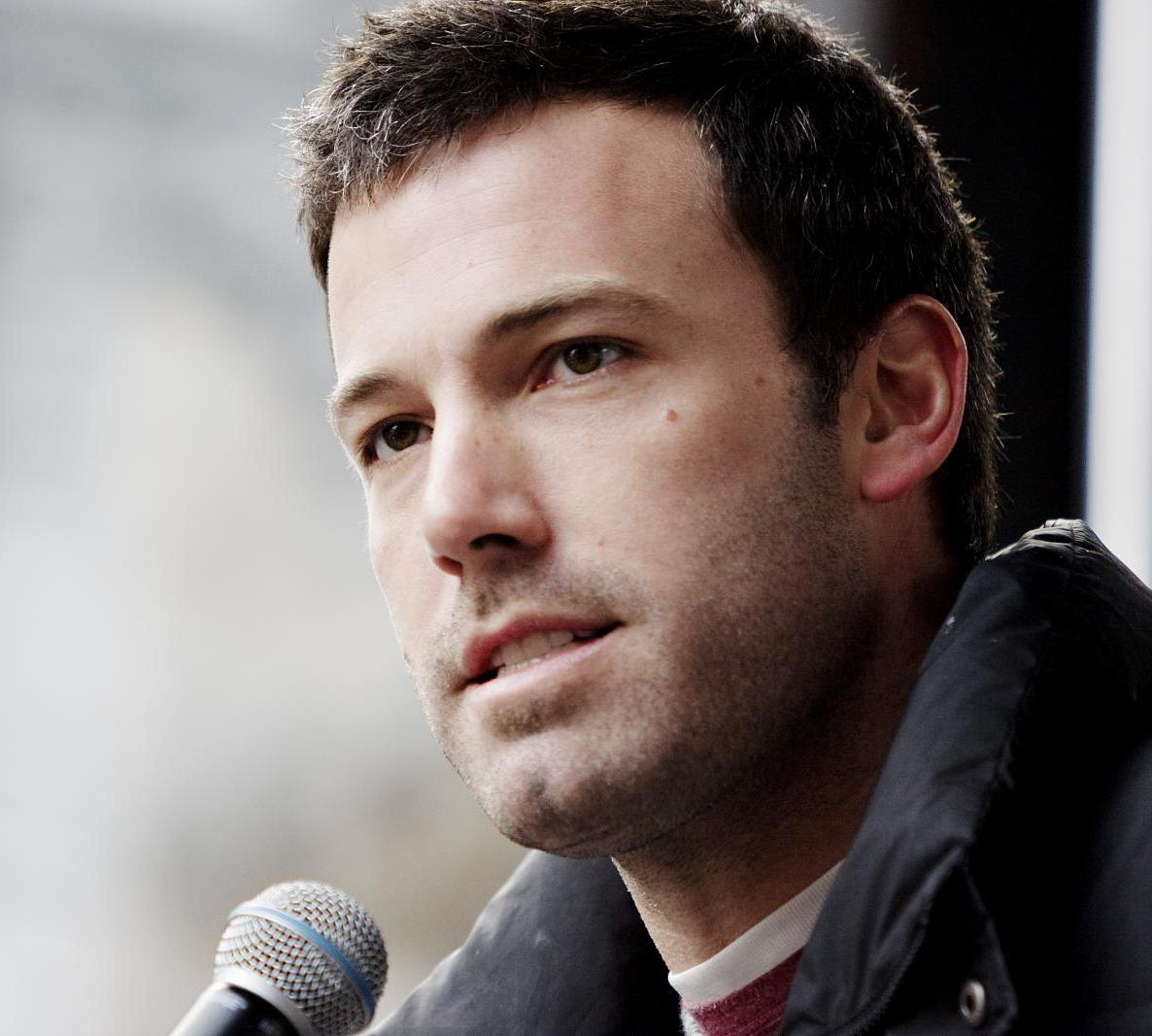
Affleck speaking at a Feeding America rally in 2009

Affleck is a supporter of Paralyzed Veterans of America. He filmed public service announcements for the organization in both 2009 and 2014. He has also volunteered on behalf of Operation Gratitude.

Affleck is a member of Feeding America's Entertainment Council. He made an appearance at the Greater Boston Food Bank in 2007, and at a Denver food bank in 2008. Affleck spoke at a Feeding America rally in Washington D.C. in 2009, and filmed a public service announcement for the charity in 2010. Affleck and Ellen DeGeneres launched Feeding America's Small Change Campaign in 2011. Also that year, he and Howard Graham Buffett co-wrote an article for The Huffington Post, highlighting the "growing percentage of the food insecure population that is not eligible for federal nutrition programs". During the COVID-19 pandemic, Affleck organized an online celebrity poker tournament to benefit the charity, made a personal donation and urged others to support the cause.

Affleck is a supporter of the Los Angeles-based homelessness charity Midnight Mission, having volunteered at and donated to the charity. He has also volunteered at Atlanta Mission.

== Politics ==
=== Political views ===
Affleck has described himself as "moderately liberal." He was raised in "a very strong union household". In 2000, he spoke at a rally at Harvard University in support of an increased living wage for all workers on campus; his father worked as a janitor at the university. He later narrated a documentary, Occupation (2002), about a sit-in organized by the Harvard Living Wage Campaign. Affleck and Senator Ted Kennedy held a press conference on Capitol Hill in 2004, pushing for an increase in the minimum wage. He spoke at a 2007 press conference at Boston's City Hall in support of SEIU's unionization efforts for the city's low-paid hospital workers. During the Writers' Strike in 2008, Affleck voiced support for the picketers.

Affleck is pro-choice. In a 2000 interview, he stated that he believes "very strongly in a woman's right to choose". In 2012, he supported the Draw the Line campaign, describing reproductive rights as "fundamental".

Affleck was a longtime supporter of legalizing gay marriage, saying in 2004 that he hoped to look back on the marriage debate "with some degree of embarrassment for how antiquated it was". Also that year, he remarked that it was "outrageous and offensive" to suggest members of the transgender community were not entitled to equal rights. He appeared alongside his gay cousin in a 2005 Parents and Friends of Lesbians and Gays print advertising campaign.

In 2008, Affleck expressed concern about conspiracy theories claiming Barack Obama was an Arab or a Muslim: "This prejudice that we have allowed to fester in this campaign ... the acceptance of both of those things as a legitimate slur is really a problem." A reporter for The Washington Post overheard Affleck denouncing the Israeli invasion of Gaza at a Washington party in 2009. Steven Clemons, a participant in the conversation, said Affleck listened "to alternative takes ... What Affleck spoke about that night was reasoned, complex and made a lot of sense." Later that year, in a New York Times interview, Affleck remarked that his views were closer to those of the Israeli Labor Party than Likud. In 2012, he praised Senator John McCain's leadership in defending Huma Abedin against anti-Muslim attacks. Affleck engaged in a widely shared discussion about the relationship between liberal principles and Islam during a 2014 appearance on Real Time with Bill Maher. In a 2017 Guardian interview, he reflected on the viral moment: "I strongly believe that no one should be stereotyped on the basis of their race or religion. It's one of the most fundamental tenets of liberal thought." In 2023, Affleck signed the Artists4Ceasefire open letter calling for a ceasefire during the Israeli bombardment of Gaza.

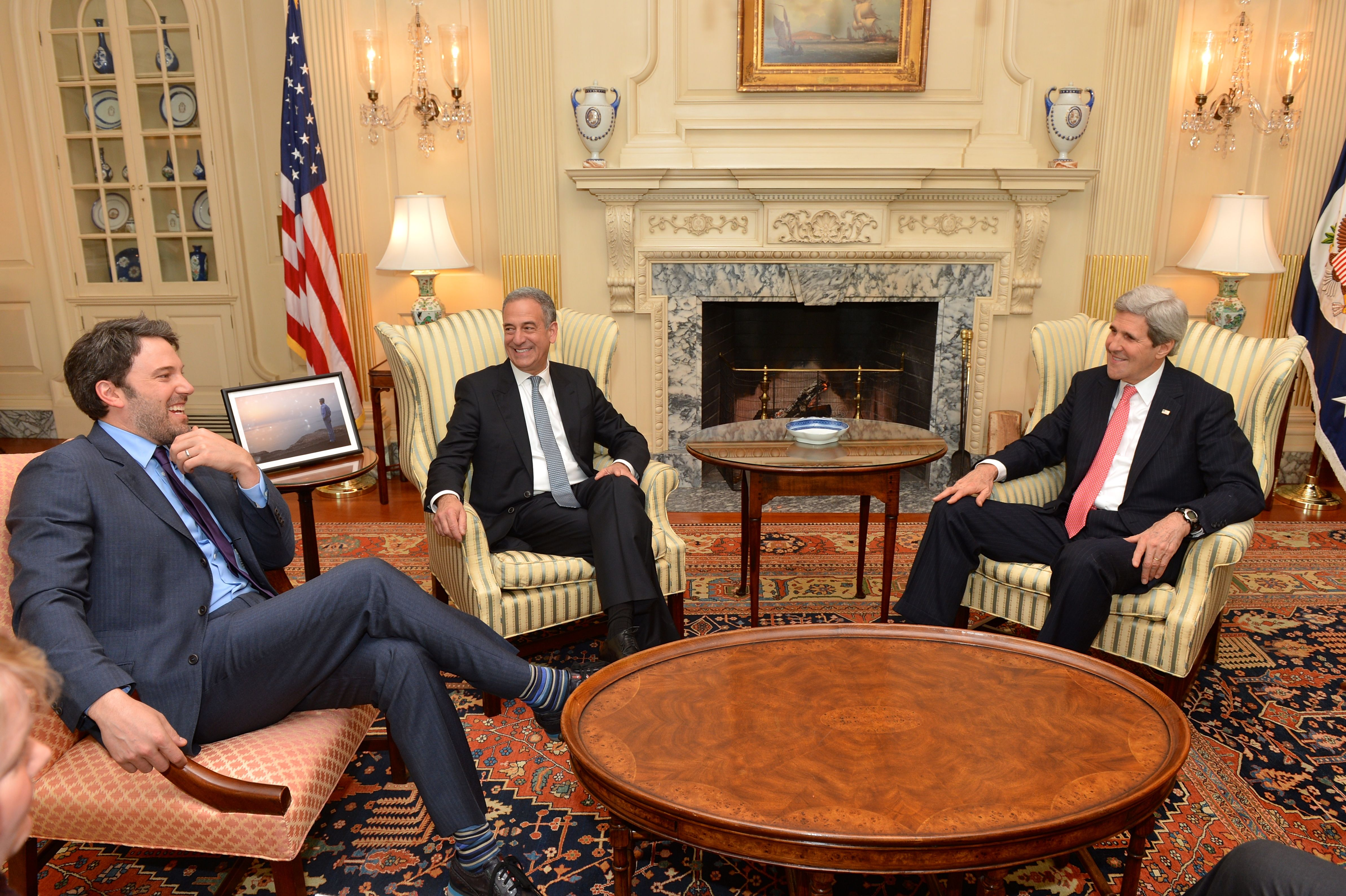
Affleck with Russ Feingold and Secretary of State John Kerry in February 2014

Affleck appeared at a press conference with New York Senator Chuck Schumer in 2002, in support of a proposed Anti-Nuclear Terrorism Prevention Act. In 2003, he criticized the "questionable and aggressive" use of the Patriot Act and the resulting "encroachments on civil liberties". Affleck criticized the Bush tax cuts on many occasions. In 2007, he filmed a public service announcement for Divided We Fail, a nonpartisan AARP campaign seeking affordable, quality healthcare for all Americans.

Affleck expressed support for the Second Amendment in 2004, and said in 2012 that he owned several guns, both for skeet shooting and for the protection of his family. In 2020, he said trips to gun ranges as a young adult made him "uncomfortable to remember ... given the subsequent tragedies with young people and guns."

Affleck appeared alongside then-Senator Barack Obama at a 2006 rally in support of Proposition 87, which sought to reduce petroleum consumption in favor of alternative energy. He appeared in a global warming awareness video produced by the Center for American Progress Action Fund in 2007. Also that year, Affleck admitted he was not "particularly good at being green" while, in 2014, he named "a 1966 Chevelle" as his guilty pleasure. In 2016, Affleck filmed an endorsement for Rezpect Our Water, an online petition to stop construction of the Dakota Access Pipeline.

=== Democratic Party involvement ===
Affleck registered to vote as a Democrat in 1992, and has campaigned on behalf of several Democratic presidential nominees. He supported Al Gore in the final weeks of the 2000 presidential campaign, attending rallies in California, Pennsylvania, and Florida. However, Affleck was unable to vote due to a registration issue in New York City, where he was residing at the time, and later joked, "I'm going to vote twice next time, in true Boston fashion."

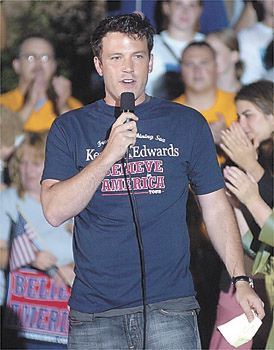
Affleck speaking at a John Kerry rally in Zanesville, Ohio, in 2004

Affleck was involved in the 2004 presidential campaign of John Kerry. During the Democratic National Convention in Boston, he spoke to many delegations, appeared on political discussion shows, and attended fundraising events. Affleck took part in a voter registration public service announcement, and traveled with Kerry during the opening weekend of his Believe in America Tour, making speeches at rallies in Pennsylvania, West Virginia, and Ohio.

Affleck campaigned for President Barack Obama. He appeared alongside the then-Senator at a 2006 rally, introducing him as "the most galvanizing leader to come out of either party, in my opinion, in at least a decade". He donated to Obama's presidential campaign in 2007, and hosted two fundraisers for the candidate during the 2008 Democratic Primary. Affleck urged voters to "help make history" in a MoveOn.org campaign, and made several appearances during the 2008 Democratic National Convention. In the week of the presidential election, he appeared on Saturday Night Live to jokingly endorse Senator John McCain. Affleck did not actively campaign for Obama's reelection in 2012, though he still supported him.

Affleck supported Hillary Clinton's 2016 presidential election campaign. He first met Clinton at Camp David in 1998, and, when she was a Senate candidate in 2000, he introduced her at a Cornell University rally and helped fundraise for her campaign. Affleck pointed to the First Lady's work with children, women and "working families". He supported Obama during the 2008 Democratic Primary, noting that Clinton had "moved toward the center" during the campaign. Affleck donated to Clinton's campaign fund during the 2016 Democratic Primary. During the 2016 presidential election, Affleck recorded a New Hampshire voter public service announcement, and was named by the Clinton campaign as a "Hillblazer" – one of 1,100 individuals who had contributed or raised at least $100,000. OpenSecrets reported that he raised $149,028.

During the latter stages of the 2020 Democratic Party presidential primaries, Affleck said during an interview conducted in Spanish: "I like Bernie, I like Biden, I like Warren but the thing is that most of all; I don't like Trump." When Biden became the Democratic candidate, he donated to his campaign fund.

In 2002, Affleck donated to Dick Gephardt's Congressional campaign, Robert Reich's campaign for Governor of Massachusetts, and appeared in campaign literature for former classmate Marjorie Decker, running as a city councilor in Massachusetts. He made donations to the presidential campaigns of both Dennis Kucinich and Wesley Clark in 2003. In 2005, he donated to the campaign fund of Deval Patrick, a candidate for Governor of Massachusetts. In 2006, Affleck contributed to Cory Booker's Newark mayoral campaign, to Eliot Spitzer's New York gubernatorial campaign, and introduced Congressmen Joe Courtney and Chris Murphy at rallies in Connecticut. He donated to the 2008 Congressional campaign of Pennsylvania's Patrick Murphy, and to the 2010 Senate campaign of Kirsten Gillibrand. Affleck hosted a 2012 fundraiser for Senate candidate Elizabeth Warren, endorsed her in a Progressive Change Campaign Committee video, and made a campaign donation. In 2013, he hosted a fundraiser for Cory Booker, and made donations to the Senate campaigns of both Booker and Alison Lundergan Grimes. In 2014, he donated to Bobby Shriver's Los Angeles County Supervisor campaign, and to Prophet La'omar Walker's California State Assembly campaign. He donated to the campaign of Senate candidate Kamala Harris in 2015 and, in 2016, he donated to the Congressional campaign of Melissa Gilbert and the West Virginia Senate campaign of Corey Palumbo. In 2017, he donated to the Senate reelection campaigns of Elizabeth Warren and Chris Coons, and to Adam Schiff's Congressional campaign. In 2018, he made contributions to the Congressional campaigns of Alexandria Ocasio-Cortez, Sharice Davids and Leann Jacobsen, and to Michigan gubernatorial candidate Abdul El-Sayed and Georgia gubernatorial candidate Stacey Abrams. In 2019, Affleck donated to the presidential campaigns funds of both Cory Booker and Kamala Harris, and hosted a fundraiser for Booker. Also in 2019, he contributed to the congressional campaign funds of both Alexandria Ocasio-Cortez and Ilhan Omar. In 2020, he spoke at a virtual rally in support of Whitney Williams, a candidate in the 2020 Montana gubernatorial election, and donated to her campaign fund. In 2023, he donated to the Senate campaign of Barbara Lee.

In the early 2000s, Affleck often expressed an interest in running for political office one day, but since 2007, he has denied any political ambitions and spoken repeatedly about the need for campaign finance reform. In 2005, The Washington Post reported that Virginia Democrats were trying to persuade Affleck to run as a Senate candidate. His publicist dismissed the rumor. In 2012, political pundits and Democratic strategists including Bob Shrum and Tad Devine speculated that Affleck was considering running for a Massachusetts Senate seat. Affleck denied the rumor, and joked that he "also won't be throwing my hat in the ring to run the UN".

== Personal life ==
=== Relationship with Jennifer Garner ===
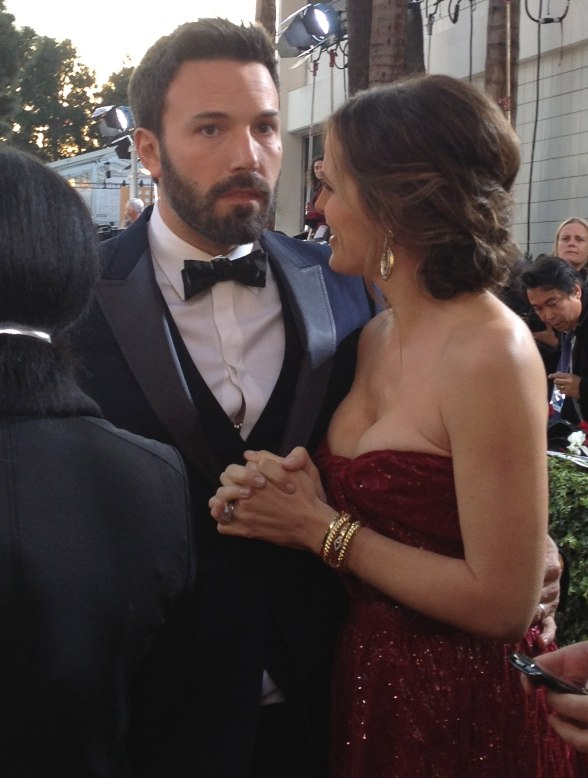
Affleck and Jennifer Garner at the 70th Golden Globe Awards in 2013

Affleck was married to actress Jennifer Garner from 2005 to 2018. They began dating in August 2004, having established a friendship on the sets of Pearl Harbor (2001) and Daredevil (2003). They were married on June 29, 2005, in a private Turks and Caicos ceremony. Victor Garber, who officiated the ceremony, and his partner, Rainer Andreesen, were the only guests. Affleck and Garner have three children together.

They publicly announced their separation in June 2015, with Affleck continuing to live in a guesthouse at the family home until mid-2017. They jointly filed for divorce in April 2017, seeking joint physical and legal custody of their children. They jointly hired a mediator to help them negotiate a financial settlement and the divorce was finalized in October 2018. In 2020, Affleck described the divorce as "the biggest regret of my life" and "a painful experience, even if you're on the best possible terms and you agree it's the best choice."

While Affleck believes paparazzi attention is "part of the deal" of stardom, he has spoken out against photographs taken at his private residence and paparazzi interest in his children specifically, who he says became the "big money" draw for photographers waiting outside his home. In 2013, Affleck and Garner hosted an event for lawmakers at their home in support of a bill that would protect celebrities' children from harassment by photographers; their six-year-old daughter made a speech about her personal experiences. Garner also testified before the California Assembly Judiciary Committee in support of the bill, which later became law. Despite the legislation, photographers still regularly waited outside their children's school and police assistance was sometimes required. In 2014, Affleck argued in favor of United Kingdom-style legislation that requires media outlets to blur children's faces in published photos. He has said there are "real practical dangers" involved in paparazzi attention, citing Garner's longtime stalker, Steven Burky, who was arrested in December 2009 while trying to blend in with paparazzi outside their daughter's preschool. Burky was charged with two counts of stalking, to which he pleaded not guilty by reason of insanity. In March 2010, he was ruled insane, sent to California's state mental hospital, and ordered to stay away from the Affleck-Garner family for 10 years if released.

=== Relationship with Jennifer Lopez ===
Affleck first dated Jennifer Lopez from 2002 to 2004. They became friends on the set of Gigli in December 2001, having previously encountered each other at industry parties. They began a romantic relationship in July 2002 when Lopez filed for divorce from her second husband, Cris Judd. Their relationship was extensively publicized, with tabloids referring to the couple as Bennifer, the first celebrity portmanteau of its kind. They appeared together in the music video for her song "Jenny from the Block" and the film Jersey Girl. Lopez's album This Is Me... Then was dedicated to and inspired by Affleck. They became engaged in November 2002 but their planned wedding on September 14, 2003, was postponed with four days' notice because of "excessive media attention". They called off the engagement in January 2004.

Affleck and Lopez remained in occasional contact in the years after their breakup and spoke highly of each other in public. (Note: Attributed to multiple sources.) According to Lopez, Affleck's discomfort with the media scrutiny was one reason for their split and, years later, she described it as her "first real heartbreak": "I think different time, different thing, who knows what could've happened but there was a genuine love there." Both during the relationship and in the months after the breakup, Affleck characterized some of the media commentary as rooted in racism, classism, and sexism: "We were thought of as two different kinds of people." In subsequent years, he pushed back against the "curious notion" that he should view the relationship as a mistake, and reflected on the prevailing tabloid culture at the time. Affleck acknowledged that "there were ways I did contribute to it", citing the "Jenny from the Block" music video and a joint promotional interview for Gigli. He said neither of them "anticipated" the degree of attention they would receive: "I think Jen and I made a mistake in that we fell in love, we were excited and maybe too accessible."

Affleck and Lopez began dating again in April 2021, 20 years after they had first met. They announced their second engagement in April 2022 and were married in a Las Vegas ceremony on July 16, 2022, hosting a larger celebration for family and friends at Affleck's Georgia house later that summer. The couple separated in April 2024, with Lopez filing for divorce in August of that year. The divorce was finalized in February 2025. Affleck later said there was "no scandal, no soap opera, no intrigue" involved in their divorce.

=== Other relationships ===
Affleck was in a relationship with Cheyenne Rothman from 1990 to 1997. Affleck began dating actress Gwyneth Paltrow in October 1997 after they met at a Miramax dinner, and they later worked together on Shakespeare in Love (1998). Although they first broke up in January 1999, months later, Paltrow persuaded Affleck to co-star with her in Bounce (2000) and they soon resumed their relationship. They separated again in October 2000. In 2015, Paltrow said they were friends.

Affleck had a long-distance relationship with New York-based television producer Lindsay Shookus from mid-2017 to mid-2018; they briefly dated again in early 2019. Affleck dated Cuban actress Ana de Armas, whom he met on the set of Deep Water in the fall of 2019, from early 2020 to early 2021.

=== Health ===
Affleck has both anxiety and depression, and has taken antidepressants since age 26. He is a recovering alcoholic and follows a 12-step program. He said he used alcohol to alleviate a constant feeling of "discomfort" and remarked that it "took me a long time to fundamentally, deeply, without a hint of doubt, admit to myself that I am an alcoholic."

Affleck became sober in his mid-twenties, stating in a 1998 interview that alcohol was "dangerous" for him. He received residential treatment for addiction in 2001 and maintained his sobriety for a "couple of years" afterward. In subsequent years, he refused to discuss his alcoholism in press interviews and later described it as a period where he "drank relatively normally". "I thought, 'I want to just drink like a normal person. I want to have wine at dinner.' And I was able to for about eight years." Affleck gradually began to drink "more and more" and, eventually, was drinking until he "passed out" on a nightly basis. Garner supported Affleck's struggles with alcoholism during and after their marriage and said in 2020 that attending Al-Anon meetings empowered her to change "the dance" of their relationship. Affleck received residential treatment in 2017 and, following a publicly documented relapse and intervention, again in 2018. He completed further outpatient treatment over the following year. In late 2019, TMZ filmed him stumbling on a Los Angeles street; he acknowledged the following day that he had a brief "slip" after over a year of sobriety. He later described the incident as "embarrassing": "I wish it didn't happen. I really wish it wasn't on the internet for my kids to see."

During press for The Way Back (2020), in which he plays an alcoholic, Affleck stressed that he felt "vulnerable" when talking about his addiction and did not intend to "go on talking about this issue forever": "I think the value, if there is value in me talking about being a recovering alcoholic, is that that doesn't have to be who you are. That doesn't have to be the label on your head." In 2023, he said he often advises fellow actors to avoid speaking publicly about their addiction issues where possible: "You don't need to be anybody's poster child."

=== Gambling ===
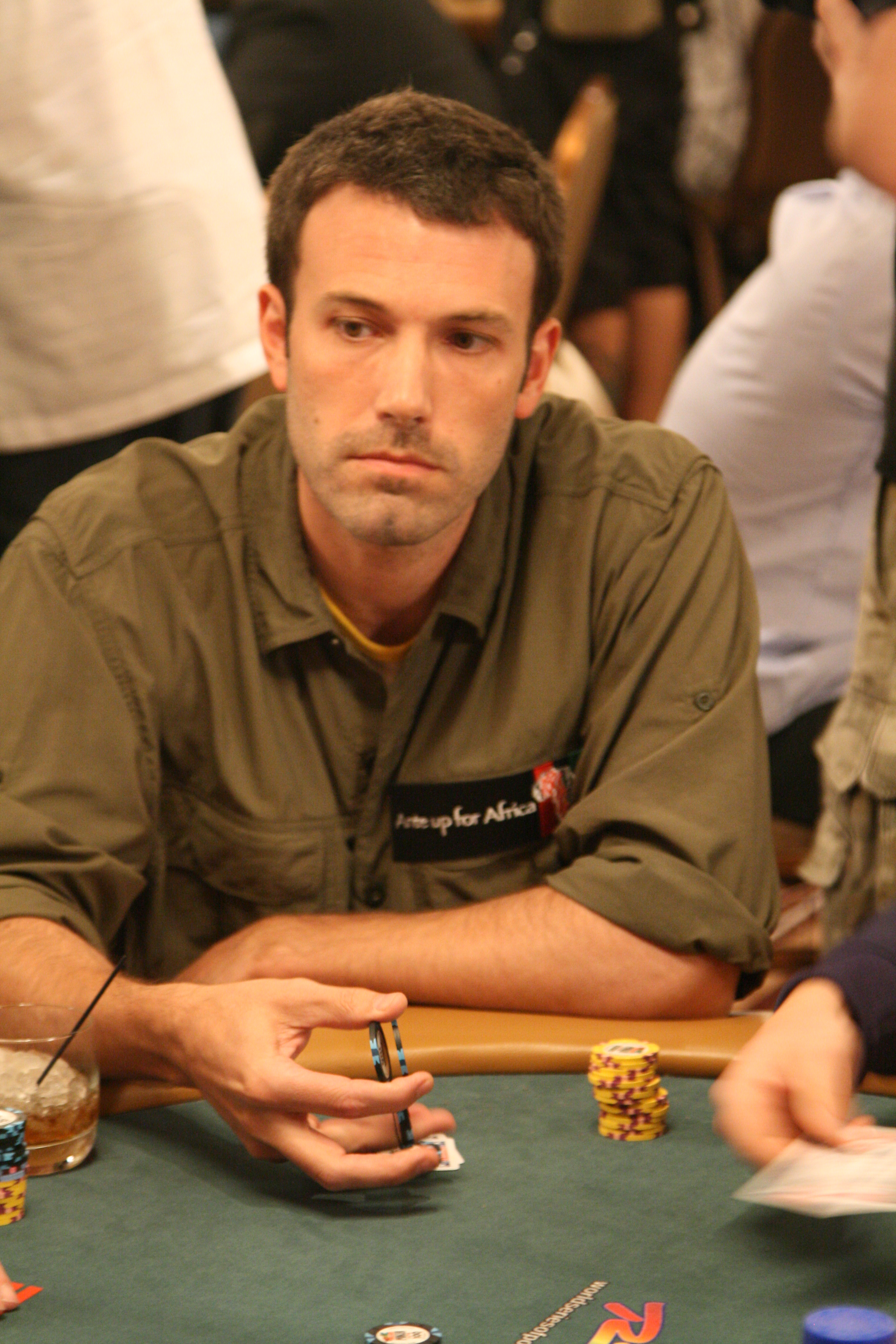
Affleck at the 2008 World Series of Poker in Las Vegas, Nevada

Affleck won the 2004 California State Poker Championship, taking home the first prize of $356,400 and qualifying for the 2004 World Poker Tour final tournament. He was one of many celebrities, along with Leonardo DiCaprio and Tobey Maguire, who took part in Molly Bloom's high-stakes poker games in the mid-2000s. Affleck has repeatedly denied tabloid reports of a gambling addiction.

=== Religious beliefs ===
Affleck came from an Episcopalian family, but was not raised in a religious household. In 2008, he listed the Gospel of Matthew as one of the books that made a difference in his life. As infants, each of his three children were baptized as members of the United Methodist Church and, from 2015 to 2020, Affleck, Garner and their children were regularly photographed at Methodist church services in Los Angeles.

Affleck is agnostic and has described faith as a "struggle": "But the twelve-step program is faith-based ... Faith has served me well in recovery as an alcoholic." He identifies more with the teachings of Buddhism: "I have a difficult time with the theistic aspects of AA ... One of the things I like about Buddhism is it's like, believe what you believe."

=== Ancestry ===
Affleck's ancestry is English, Welsh, Scottish and German, along with some Irish.

Affleck appeared on the PBS genealogy series Finding Your Roots in 2014. When told that an ancestor had been a slave owner in Georgia, Affleck responded: "God. It gives me kind of a sagging feeling to see a biological relationship to that. But, you know, there it is, part of our history ... We tend to separate ourselves from these things by going like, 'It's just dry history, and it's all over now'." Leaked emails from the 2015 Sony email hacking scandal showed that, after filming, Affleck felt uncomfortable about the segment, which was not included in the final broadcast. The show's host, professor Henry Louis Gates Jr., stated: "We focused on what we felt were the most interesting aspects of his ancestry." An internal investigation by PBS concluded that Affleck had exerted "improper influence" over the editorial process and that the producers of the show, including Gates, had violated PBS standards by improperly withholding information. The show was temporarily postponed, resuming after a fact-checker and an "independent genealogist" were added to the show's staff. Affleck's episode was removed from the show's online archive.

=== MeToo allegations ===
During the MeToo movement in 2017, Affleck was accused by two women of inappropriate behavior. Actress Hilarie Burton stated that, during an on-air appearance on TRL Uncensored in 2003, Affleck "wraps his arm around me, and comes over and tweaks my left boob". Affleck responded on Twitter: "I acted inappropriately toward Ms. Burton and I sincerely apologize." Annamarie Tendler, a makeup artist, said that Affleck "grabbed my ass at a Golden Globes party in 2014 ... He tried to play it like he was politely moving me out of the way."

In response to the allegations of sexual assault against Harvey Weinstein, Affleck pledged to donate any future profits from his early Miramax films to charities supporting victims of sexual assault, and said he had only been aware that Weinstein "was sleazy and a bully". In a tweet, actress Rose McGowan responded: "You lie." She said she met Affleck after being sexually assaulted by Weinstein during the Sundance Film Festival in 1997 and told him, while crying, that she had "just come from Harvey's and he said, 'Goddamnit, I told him to stop doing that.'" In a leaked email regarding McGowan's case, Affleck stated: "I never saw Rose at any hotel in Sundance. She never told me nor did I ever infer that she was attacked by anyone." In a 2019 interview, Affleck said: "I don't really want to get into other people's individual stories because I feel like those are their stories and they're entitled to tell as much or as little of those as they want. I believe Rose. I support her. I really like and admire her tenacity and I wish her the best." In 2020, McGowan clarified her comments: "It's not like I'm raging at Ben Affleck. I never said to him, 'I was just raped.' It's just more to illustrate the point of this continual thing of everybody knowing and everybody being part of it, unwittingly or proactively."

== Filmography and awards ==
Affleck has appeared in more than 50 films and won many accolades throughout his career as an actor, writer, and director. He first gained recognition as a writer when he won the Golden Globe and the Academy Award for Best Original Screenplay for Good Will Hunting (1997), which he co-wrote with Matt Damon; Affleck remains the youngest person ever to win a Best Original Screenplay Oscar, at 25 years old. As an actor, he received Golden Globe nominations for his performances in Hollywoodland (2006) and The Tender Bar (2021). The film Argo (2012), which he directed, co-produced, and starred in, won him the Golden Globe Award, BAFTA, and Directors Guild Award for Best Director, as well as the Golden Globe Award, BAFTA, the Producers Guild Award, and the Academy Award for Best Picture.
