= African-American Film Critics Association Awards 2012 =

Annual US film awards ceremony

10th African-American Film Critics Association Awards

Highlights
- Best Picture: Zero Dark Thirty

Below are the winners for the 2012 African-American film Critics Association Awards.

== Winners ==
- Best Picture:
  - 1. Zero Dark Thirty (Winner)
  - 2. Argo
  - 3. Lincoln
  - 4. Middle of Nowhere
  - 5. Life of Pi
  - 6. Les Misérables
  - 7. Django Unchained
  - 8. Beasts of the Southern Wild
  - 9. Moonrise Kingdom
  - 10. Think Like a Man

Category	Recipient	Film
Best Actor	Denzel Washington	Flight
Best Actress	Emayatzy Corinealdi	Middle of Nowhere
Best Director	Ben Affleck	Argo
Best Screenplay	Ava DuVernay	Middle of Nowhere
Best Supporting Actor	Nate Parker	Arbitrage
Best Supporting Actress	Sally Field	Lincoln
Breakthrough Performance	Quvenzhane Wallis	Beasts of the Southern Wild
Best Independent Film		Middle of Nowhere
Best Animated Feature		Rise of the Guardians
Best Foreign Language Film		The Intouchables
Best Music	Kathryn Bostic & Meghan Rhodes	Middle of Nowhere

Special Achievement: Billy Dee Williams & Cicely Tyson
