= Animals (2026 film) =

American crime thriller film by Ben Affleck

- Release poster
- Directed by: Ben Affleck
- Written by: Connor O. McIntyre; Billy Ray; Ben Affleck
- Produced by: Matt Damon; Ben Affleck; Brad Weston; Dani Bernfeld; Collin Creighton
- Starring: Ben Affleck; Kerry Washington; Gillian Anderson; Adriana Paz; Ray Fisher; Luis Gerardo Méndez; Steven Yeun
- Cinematography: Robert Elswit
- Edited by: William Goldenberg; Christopher Rouse
- Music by: Harry Gregson-Williams
- Production companies: Artists Equity; Makeready; Fifth Season
- Distributed by: Netflix
- Release date: October 9, 2026
- Running time: 108 minutes
- Country: United States
- Language: English

Animals is a 2026 American crime thriller film directed by Ben Affleck and written by Affleck, Connor O. McIntyre and Billy Ray. It stars Affleck, Kerry Washington, Gillian Anderson, Adriana Paz, Ray Fisher, with Luis Gerardo Méndez, and Steven Yeun. It is about a wealthy mayoral candidate, Mark Kimball, and his wife Abigail, who find themselves unearthing dark secrets when they go to extreme measures to pay their kidnapped son's ransom.

It was released on Netflix and in select theaters on October 9, 2026 and received generally negative reviews from critics.

== Plot ==
Before the Los Angeles mayoral race, independent candidate Mark Kimball faces defeat so, at his campaign manager Sam's urging, Mark commits his life savings to an outreach effort targeting the Latino American vote. He expects to recover the money after winning the election. Meanwhile, his wife Abigail has grown distant from Mark during his campaign, begun an affair with Ron, and plans to file for divorce.

On Halloween, the Kimballs' son Denny goes trick-or-treating with their housekeeper Cecilia and her boyfriend Ramon's son, Hector. The boys wear identical costumes. As night falls, Cecilia loses sight of them while an unidentified figure watches. At the Kimball mansion, an anonymous caller threatens to kill Denny unless a $7 million ransom is paid by midnight without police involvement. Mark reveals to Abigail the ransom cannot be met as he had secretly committed their savings to his campaign.

Sam proposes hiring an operative, Dayle, to handle the ransom and the kidnappers. Dayle demands a 20% fee regardless of the outcome. Ramon arrives to wait for Cecilia. Suddenly Denny appears unharmed, oblivious of the kidnapping. Cecilia arrives soon after, then the caller sends video proof so everyone realizes Hector was accidentally kidnapped.

Mark and Sam attend a rally. Meanwhile Ramon finds one of the kidnappers watching the mansion, they fight but the lookout kidnapper escapes. During the rally the caller demands more money, but Dayle insists Mark stick to the original ransom amount. At home, Mark discovers Abigail's affair with Ron, confronting her. They talk it out and reconcile.

Mark offers Dayle more to kill the kidnappers while recovering Hector. As leverage, she records his ordering the hit. Mark goes to meet the kidnappers in Frogtown with Dayle following. Dayle's sniper eliminates two kidnappers during the exchange, but an unexpected third kills him. Dayle arrives, missing Mark's warning and is also shot. Ramon arrives, shooting the third kidnapper. Mark takes Dayle's phone as she dies, removing evidence he hired her. He never finds any connection with the three kidnappers.

Ramon helps Mark conceal the bodies of all but their sniper, in exchange for Dayle's now unclaimed ransom money. The Kimballs and Ramon present a version of events portraying Mark as the one who rescued Hector. The surge in Latino voters' support enables Mark to win the mayoral race as a national hero, positioning him for a future run for higher political offices. Ramon, Cecilia, and Hector return home to Mexico as millionaires.

== Cast ==
- Ben Affleck as Mark Kimball
- Kerry Washington as Abigail Kimball
- Gillian Anderson as Dayle Burton
- Adriana Paz as Cecilia Trujillo
- Ray Fisher as Ron Sperling
- Christopher Woodley as Denny Kimball
- Luis Gerardo Méndez as Ramon Valle
- Steven Yeun as Sam Allison
- Matt Gerald as the kidnapper / James Bureaux
- Jacob Estrada as Hector
- Taylor Cooper as Hannah
- Chris Gann as Rand

== Production ==
=== Development ===
The film was announced in January 2024, with Ben Affleck directing from an original screenplay co-written by himself and Billy Ray and Matt Damon starring. In February, Jennifer Garner was in talks to join the film. Filming was scheduled to begin in March 2024 in Los Angeles. On casting ex-wife Garner opposite Damon, Affleck said: "I thought, 'God, Jen Garner would be amazing for this role.' It also has the added benefit of, like, both of us will see our kids more because we do a week and a week and back and forth. I thought, well, we can coordinate our schedules around it. She could bring something interesting that she hasn't [done], that I kind of know she can do, that I don't think she had a chance to do in one movie." Gillian Anderson and Steven Yeun were also quietly cast around this time, however Affleck ultimately decided to delay the production just before filming began after getting cold feet.

A year later, in February 2025, production moved ahead with Damon no longer part of the cast, due to his commitment to The Odyssey, with Affleck himself taking on the lead role, and Anderson officially joining the cast. Kerry Washington (replacing Garner), Yeun, Luis Gerardo Méndez, and Adriana Paz also joined the cast in February. On replacing Garner with Washington after stepping into the lead role himself, Affleck later elaborated: "I talked to Jen, and she was like, 'We don't wanna do that. You just get baggage,'... I still would wanna work with her in the future, but what you don't wanna do is take the audience's baggage and have it work against you, you know?" In March, Ray Fisher, Mark Kassen, and Christopher Woodley joined the cast.

=== Filming ===
Principal photography began on March 7, 2025 in Los Angeles.

== Release ==
Animals was released on Netflix and in select theaters on October 9, 2026.

== Reception ==
On the review aggregator website Rotten Tomatoes, 30% of 83 critics' reviews are positive, with an average rating of 5.4/10. Metacritic, which uses a weighted average, assigned the film a score of 33 out of 100, based on 21 critics, indicating "generally unfavorable" reviews.

== See also ==
- High and Low, a 1963 Japanese police procedural film by Akira Kurosawa about a ransom held for the mistaken kidnapping of a working class family's child
  - Highest 2 Lowest, a 2025 American remake by Spike Lee
