= Vonda N. McIntyre bibliography =

Vonda Neel McIntyre (August 28, 1948 – April 1, 2019) was an American science fiction writer and biologist. This bibliography includes all of her published novels, short fiction, edited volumes, and all collections that include material not previously published.

== Books ==
Title	Series or setting, where applicable	Format	Year of first publication	First edition publisher	Notes	Unique identifier	Citations
The Exile Waiting		Novel	1975	Nelson Doubleday	Republished in 2019 along with "Cages", a short story set in the same universe, originally published in 1972. Shares a setting with Dreamsnake (1978).	OCLC 722575623	
Dreamsnake		Novel	1978	Houghton Mifflin	Incorporated McIntyre's 1973 short story "Of Mist, and Grass, and Sand" as its first part. Also incorporated "The Broken Dome" and "The Serpent's Death", both published in 1978. Shares a setting with The Exile Waiting (1975).	OCLC 79980048	
Superluminal		Novel	1983	Houghton Mifflin	Expanded from McIntyre's 1977 short story "Aztecs"; also incorporated her 1983 short story "Transit".	ISBN 9780395349427	
The Bride		Novel	1985	Dell Books		ISBN 9780440108016	
Barbary		Novel	1986	Houghton Mifflin		ISBN 9780395410295	
The Moon and the Sun		Novel	1997	Pocket Books		ISBN 9780671567651	
The Crystal Star	Star Wars Expanded Universe	Novel	1994	Bantam Spectra		ISBN 9780553571745	
Starfarers	Starfarers	Novel	1989	Ace Books		ISBN 9780441780532	
Transition	Starfarers	Novel	1991	Ace Books		ISBN 9780553288506	
Metaphase	Starfarers	Novel	1992	Ace Books		ISBN 9780553292237	
Nautilus	Starfarers	Novel	1994	Ace Books		ISBN 9780553560268	
The Entropy Effect	Star Trek	Novel	1981	Pocket Books		OCLC 1034681352	
The Wrath of Khan	Star Trek	Novel	1982	Pocket Books	A novelization of Star Trek II: The Wrath of Khan (1982)	ISBN 9780671741495	
The Search for Spock	Star Trek	Novel	1984	Pocket Books	A novelization of Star Trek III: The Search for Spock (1984)	ISBN 9780671495008	
The Voyage Home	Star Trek	Novel	1986	Pocket Books	A novelization of Star Trek IV: The Voyage Home (1986)	ISBN 9780671632663	
Enterprise: The First Adventure	Star Trek	Novel	1986	Pocket Books		ISBN 9780671625818	
Fireflood and Other Stories		Short story collection	1979	Houghton Mifflin		ISBN 9780395284223	
Aurora: Beyond Equality		Edited volume	1976	Fawcett Gold Medal	Edited with Susan Janice Anderson	OCLC 633283420	
Nebula Awards Showcase 2004		Edited volume	2004	Roc Books		ISBN 9780451459572	
Little Sisters and Other Stories		Short story collection	2024	Goldsmiths Press	Posthumously published.	ISBN 9780671625818	
The Curve of the World		Novel	2026	Aqueduct Press	Posthumously published.	ISBN 9781619762800	

== Short fiction ==
Title	Time of first publication	Publication of appearance	Notes	Citations
"Breaking Point"	February 1970	Venture Science Fiction, vol. 4	McIntyre's first published work.	
"Cages"	1971	Quark/4, ed. Samuel R. Delany and Marilyn Hacker, pub. Paperback Library.	Introduced characters that would later feature in The Exile Waiting (1975).	
"Only at Night"	1971	Clarion, ed. Robin Scott Wilson, pub. New American Library.	Later collected in Fireflood and Other Stories (1979)	
"The Galactic Clock"	1972	Generation, ed. David Gerrold and Stephen Goldin, pub. Dell Books.	Published under the name "V. N. McIntyre".	
"The Genius Freaks"	1973	Orbit 12, ed. Damon Knight, pub. G. P. Putnam's Sons.	Later collected in Fireflood and Other Stories (1979)	
"Spectra"	1973	Orbit 11, ed. Damon Knight, pub. G. P. Putnam's Sons.	Later collected in Fireflood and Other Stories (1979)	
"Wings"	1973	The Alien Condition, ed. Stephen Goldin, pub. Ballantine Books.	Later collected in Fireflood and Other Stories (1979)	
"Of Mist, and Grass, and Sand"	October 1973	Analog Science Fiction and Fact, vol. 92	Later appeared unchanged as the first chapter of Dreamsnake (1978); also collected in Fireflood and Other Stories (1979). Brought McIntyre her first Nebula Award.	
"Recourse, Inc."	1974	Alternities, ed. David Gerrold, pub. Dell Books.	Later collected in Fireflood and Other Stories	
"The Mountains of Sunset, the Mountains of Dawn"	February 1974	The Magazine of Fantasy & Science Fiction, vol. 46	Later collected in Fireflood and Other Stories (1979)	
"Screwtop"	1976	The Crystal Ship, ed. Robert Silverberg, pub. Thomas Nelson.	Later collected in Fireflood and Other Stories (1979)	
"Thanatos"	1976	Future Power, ed. Jack Dann and Gardner Dozois, pub. Random House		
"The End's Beginning"	September 1976	Analog Science Fiction and Fact, vol. 96	Later collected in Fireflood and Other Stories (1979)	
"Aztecs"	1977	2076: The American Tricentennial, ed. Edward Bryant, pub. Pyramid Books.	Later collected in Fireflood and Other Stories; expanded into the novel Superluminal (1983).	
"The Serpent's Death"	February 1978	Analog Science Fiction and Fact, vol. 98.	Incorporated into Dreamsnake (1978)	
"Broken Dome"	March 1978	Analog Science Fiction and Fact, vol. 98.	Incorporated into Dreamsnake (1978)	
"Fireflood"	November 1979	The Magazine of Fantasy & Science Fiction, vol. 57	Later collected in Fireflood and Other Stories (1979)	
"Shadows, Moving"	1980	Interfaces, ed. Ursula K. Le Guin and Virginia Kidd, pub. Ace Books.		
"Elfleda"	1981	New Dimensions 12, ed. Marta Randall and Robert Silverberg, pub. Pocket Books.		
"Looking for Satan"	1981	Shadows of Sanctuary, ed. Robert Lynn Asprin, pub. Ace Books.	Anthologized in Lythande (1986), along with several stories by Marion Zimmer Bradley. Set in the Thieves' World, a setting shared by multiple authors.	
"Transit"	October 1983	Asimov's Science Fiction, vol. 7	Later incorporated into the novel Superluminal (1983).	
"Malheur Maar"	1989	Full Spectrum 2, ed. Lou Aronica, Shawna McCarthy, Amy Stout and Patrick LoBrutto, pub. Doubleday.		
"Steelcollar Worker"	November 1992	Analog Science Fiction and Fact, vol. 122		
"The Adventure of the Field Theorems"	1995	Sherlock Holmes in Orbit, ed. Mike Resnick and Martin H. Greenberg, pub. DAW Books		
"The Sea Monster's Song"	November 1997	Odyssey, vol. 1		
"Night Harvest"	1998	Odyssey, vol. 4		
"Little Faces"	February 2005	Sci Fiction	First published online; appeared in print in two anthologies in 2006, The Year's Best Science Fiction: Twenty-Third Annual Collection, ed. Gardner Dozois, pub. St. Martin's Griffin, and Science Fiction: The Very Best of 2005, ed. Jonathan Strahan, pub. Locus Press.	
"A Modest Proposal"	March 2005	Nature, vol. 434.		
"Misprint"	July 2008	Nature, vol. 454.		
"LADeDeDa"	March 2009	Nature, vol. 458.	Written with Ursula K. Le Guin	
"Little Sisters"	2016	Standalone ebook, pub. Book View Cafe, ISBN 978-1-61138-519-9	A companion to "Little Faces" (2005). Appeared in print in The Best Science Fiction and Fantasy of the Year, Volume Ten, ed. Neil Gaiman et al., pub. Solaris Books.	
