= Of Mist, and Grass, and Sand =

Short story by Vonda N. McIntyre

- Short story by Vonda N. McIntyre
- Country: United States
- Language: English
- Genre: Science fiction

Publication
- Published in: Analog Science Fiction and Fact
- Publication type: Periodical
- Media type: Print
- Publication date: October 1973

"Of Mist, and Grass, and Sand" is a science fiction short story by American writer Vonda N. McIntyre. First published in Analog Science Fiction and Fact in October 1973, it was anthologized multiple times, and also formed the first chapter of McIntyre's 1978 novel Dreamsnake. Set after a nuclear holocaust, "Of Mist, and Grass, and Sand" tells of Snake, a healer who uses the venom of three genetically engineered snakes to heal, and follows her effort to heal a nomad boy of a tumor. The story won the Nebula Award for Best Novelette in 1974. It was also nominated for the Hugo Award in the same category, and for the Locus Award for Best Short Fiction. Scholar Anne Hudson Jones called it a powerful story, and stated that its themes were "mythic and universal".

== Background and setting ==
In 1971, McIntyre, then living in Seattle, set up the Clarion West writers' workshop, which she then helped run through 1973. One of the workshop's instructors was Ursula K. Le Guin. During a 1972 workshop session, one of the writing assignments was to create a story from two randomly chosen words, one pastoral, and one related to technology. McIntyre's effort would become "Of Mist, and Grass, and Sand", and later grew into her 1978 novel Dreamsnake.

"Of Mist, and Grass, and Sand" is set after a nuclear holocaust that "destroyed everyone who knew or cared about the reasons it had happened". Human society is depicted as "low-tech tribalism", with the exception of a single city. Details about the world the story is set in are revealed in Dreamsnake; "Of Mist, and Grass, and Sand" does not give the reader direct information about when the story takes place.

The protagonist of "Of Mist, and Grass, and Sand" is Snake, a healer who uses snake venom in her trade. She travels with three genetically engineered snakes; a rattlesnake, named Sand, a cobra, named Mist, and a "dreamsnake" named Grass, who is described as being from an alien world. In "Of Mist, Grass, and Sand", she is asked to heal Stavin, a young boy who has a tumor. Stavin is the son of a three-person marriage among three nomads, involving two men and a woman who is between her partners in age; such triad marriages are shown as being normal.

== Synopsis ==
The story opens with Snake among a tribe of nomads, examining Stavin, a boy she has been summoned to heal. Stavin's family is terrified of the serpents Snake uses, but has summoned her out of desperation. She allows Mist to interact with Stavin, but Stavin's family reacts with fear, startling Mist and making Snake ask them to leave. She tells Stavin that Mist will need to bite him in the morning. He asks her to let Grass, her dreamsnake, stay with him while he sleeps, and he agrees. As he sleeps, she asks Stavin's family to look after him, and tells them she hopes to heal him.

Snake drugs the body of a freshly killed animal and feeds it to Mist, squeezing out all of Mist's venom as she does so. With the help of one of the tribe's men she subdues the snake as it reacts to the drug. Talking to him afterward, she tells him that she is immune to snake venom. She asks him his name, and is told that in his tribe, names are only shared with trusted friends. She tells him to call her Snake.

During the night Mist begins to have convulsions brought on by the drugs; searching for a hollow stem to give her artificial respiration, Snake is bitten by a wild horned viper. The pain briefly incapacitates her, but her quick recovery from a normally fatal bite impresses the young man, and he tells Snake his name, Arevin. He again helps her subdue Mist without losing the healing contents of her venom sacs, and Snake thanks him for helping despite his evident fear of snakes. Arevin tells Snake that his sister was killed by a viper bite. The two of them wait out the night leaning against each other.

Snake returns to Stavin in the morning and finds that Grass is no longer with him. Stavin's parents tell her that the youngest of them, seeing Grass crawling over Stavin, mortally injured Grass. Greatly upset, Snake bites Grass in the spine to kill him instantly and end his pain, and chides the desert people for hurting a creature as small and harmless as Grass. Afraid she will hurt Stavin, they offer her anything she wants if she leaves him alone; she gets angry with them for thinking she would hurt the child for revenge. She makes Mist bite Stavin, beginning the process of healing.

After a night's rest, Snake finds Stavin is healing. She tells him that he's recovering, and that she must leave. The tribe's leader apologizes for the death of Grass. Arevin tells her he'd hoped she would stay for a while; she tells him that Grass's death was her fault, for not understanding the tribe's fear, and that without Grass she is crippled in her abilities. He offers to come with her, and she refuses, telling him that the other healers may cast her out for losing a dreamsnake. She tells him to wait for her the following spring instead, and he assents.

== Themes ==
Two snakes wound around a staff are often a symbol of medicine. The healer's snakes in "Of Mist, and Grass, and Sand" invoke this symbol.

A major theme of the story is the role of the healer in society, and the relationship between a physician and a patient. It investigates whether healers bear the responsibility for "ignorance, fear, and stupidity" on the part of their patients. According to scholar Anne Jones, Snake's name, and the snakes she uses, also have symbolic meanings drawn from religion and mythology; modern-day physicians use a staff with intertwining snakes as an emblem. McIntyre explores how Snake attempts to build trust with both Stavin and his family. She is successful with the boy, to the point where he asks her to leave Grass with him while he sleeps, but less so with his parents.

After the death of Grass, Stavin's parents are scared that Snake will hurt him, and ask her to leave the boy alone; she goes into his tent to heal him anyway, and makes Sand guard the entrance so Stavin's parents cannot follow. Snake is completely honest with the boy with respect to his treatment, telling him that he will feel pain, but later lies to him about Grass's death, so as not to affect his healing process. She thus acts to save Stavin's life, even though that requires her to lie to him and treat him without his parents' consent. According to Jones, to Snake, healing is almost a religious calling; she takes a moral responsibility for Stavin's well-being, even after Grass's death, asking "Should I kill Stavin for your stupidity?"

The story also examines themes of gender and sexuality. Lauren Lacey wrote in the Cambridge History of Science Fiction that the story challenged assumptions about gender roles. It accomplished this through Snake's character, as a powerful female protagonist, as well as through the depiction of three-person marriages as being the cultural norm. Dreamsnake tells the story of Snake's quest to replace Grass, thereby subverting the traditionally masculine trope of a questing hero.

== Publication and reception ==
First published in Analog Science Fiction and Fact in October 1973, "Of Mist, and Grass, and Sand" was published unchanged as the first chapter of McIntyre's 1978 novel Dreamsnake. It was also anthologized multiple times, including in Women of Wonder, a 1975 volume published by Random House and compiled by Pamela Sargent that included 12 science fiction stories authored by women, and in Fireflood and Other Stories, a 1979 collection of McIntyre's short fiction. The story won McIntyre her first Nebula Award, for best novelette, in 1974. Also in 1974, it was also nominated for the Hugo Award in the same category, as well as the Locus Award for Best Short Fiction. Dreamsnake would also go on to win a Nebula Award, for best novel, in addition to the 1979 Hugo Award for Best Novel and the 1979 Locus Poll Award for Best Novel.

Scholar Gary Westfahl favorably compared McIntyre's depiction of snakes to that in other works of speculative fiction, describing the story and the other works collected in Dreamsnake as the "high-point" in portrayals of fictional relationships between snakes and humans. Comparing the story to Frank Herbert's 1965 novel Dune which featured giant "sandworms", as another example of the innovative description of reptilians, Westfahl described "Of Mist, and Grass, and Sand" as "quieter and more heartfelt". Speculative fiction scholar Mike Ashley praised McIntyre's writing as "lyrical", writing that she was "creating vivid alien worlds populated by thinking and caring individuals." Ashley also noted that the story had a considerable impact when it was published, bringing recognition both for feminist science fiction and for women writers of science fiction. Scholar Anne Hudson Jones praised it as a powerful story, and stated that its themes were "mythic and universal". Reviewing Dreamsnake, science fiction critic John Clute compared it unfavorably to "Of Mist, and Grass, and Sand", describing the short story as a "moving vision of incomprehension and blindness" that deserved its Nebula award.

== Sources ==
- Ashley, Mike (2007). Gateways to Forever: The Story of the Science-Fiction Magazines from 1970 to 1980. Liverpool University Press. ISBN 978-1-84631-003-4.
- Jones, Anne Hudson (Winter 1983). "The Healer-Patient/Family Relationship in Vonda N. McIntyre's "Of Mist, and Grass, and Sand"". Perspectives in Biology and Medicine. 26 (2): 274–280. doi:10.1353/pbm.1983.0037. PMID 6844117. S2CID 40178782.
- Lacey, Lauren J. (2018). "Science Fiction, Gender, and Sexuality in the New Wave". In Canavan, Gerry; Link, Eric Carl (eds.). The Cambridge History of Science Fiction. Cambridge University Press. pp. 367–379. ISBN 978-1-316-73301-1.
- McIntyre, Vonda N. (1978). Dreamsnake. Houghton Mifflin. ISBN 978-0-395-26470-6.
