= Laura Harrington =

American actress

- Born: April 29, 1958 (age 68); Ann Arbor, Michigan, U.S.
- Education: Boston University
- Occupations: Actress; screenwriter
- Years active: 1981–1999

Laura Harrington (born April 29, 1958) is an American actress and screenwriter.

== Biography ==
A native of Ann Arbor, Michigan, Harrington attended Boston University, where she studied with David Wheeler, artistic director of the Theater Company of Boston.

Harrington made her Broadway debut under Wheeler's direction as Margaret in the 1979 revival of Richard III with Al Pacino, a fact highlighted by Bergen Record critic Emory Lewis at the conclusion of an otherwise lukewarm review:

Harrington, who portrays Lady Margaret, makes an impressive Broadway debut. Few performers know how to listen on stage. Even when she doesn't have a line of dialogue, this gifted actress speaks volumes with her eyes and her expressive hands.

Wheeler also facilitated Harrington's acclaimed 1981 screen debut in The Dark End of the Street, when he recommended her to the film's director Jan Egleson.

Harrington is perhaps best known for her role as the main character's sister in the 1993 film What's Eating Gilbert Grape. Previously seen as the character Mrs. Johnson in the cult classic 1984 film The Adventures of Buckaroo Banzai Across the Eighth Dimension, she went on to play a prominent role in the 1986 film Maximum Overdrive, written and directed by horror novelist Stephen King, in which she played the love interest to Emilio Estevez's character.

Harrington had a supporting role in the 1997 film The Devil's Advocate, alongside Keanu Reeves and Al Pacino. She has also appeared in television series including Quantum Leap. In 2013, Screen International's Jeremy Kay reported that Harrington, together with producer Bill Mechanic and writers Bill Berman and James Schamus, had adapted Vonda N. McIntyre's The Moon and the Sun for the screen. Kay revisited the story in 2014, adding one more name, Ron Bass, to the list of co-writers. However, the finished film, released eight years later as The King's Daughter, included only Berman and Schamus as credited writers.

== Filmography ==
=== Film ===
Year	Title	Role	Notes
1981	The Dark End of the Street	Donna	
1984	City Girl	Anne	
1984	Joy of Sex	Pretty Girl #2	
1984	The Adventures of Buckaroo Banzai Across the 8th Dimension	Mrs. Eunice Johnson	
1986	Maximum Overdrive	Brett	
1987	The Verne Miller Story	Judge's Daughter	
1990	Midnight Cabaret	Tanya Richards	
1990	12:01 PM	Dolores	Short
1993	What's Eating Gilbert Grape	Amy Grape	
1997	The Devil's Advocate	Melissa Black	
1998	Paulie	Lila Alweather	

=== Television ===
Year	Title	Role	Notes
1985	Not My Kid	Melody	TV film
1987	Faerie Tale Theatre	Coretta	"The Dancing Princesses"
1988	Vietnam War Story	Meg Taylor	"The Promise"
1989	L.A. Takedown	Eady	TV film
1989	Perfect Witness	Jeanie Paxton	TV film
1989	Quantum Leap	Connie LaMotta	"Jimmy"
1990	Equal Justice	Paula Jenkins	"The Art of the Possible"
1990	Against the Law	Sonia Kolowicz	"Where the Truth Lies"
1990	Cop Rock		"The Cocaine Mutiny"
1992	The Secret	Meredith Dunmore	TV film
1992	Quantum Leap	Connie LaMotta	"Deliver Us from Evil"
1993	Linda	Stella Jeffries	TV film
1994	Dead Air	Susan	TV film
1999	Providence	Gina Vinton	"Two to Tango"
