= The King's Daughter (2022 film) =

2022 American film by Sean McNamara

- Theatrical release poster
- Directed by: Sean McNamara
- Screenplay by: Barry Berman; James Schamus
- Based on: The Moon and the Sun by Vonda N. McIntyre
- Produced by: James Pang Hong; Paul Currie; Wei Han; Sean McNamara; David Brookwell; Hong Pang; Evan Wang; Qingfeng Du
- Starring: Pierce Brosnan; Kaya Scodelario; Benjamin Walker; William Hurt; Rachel Griffiths; Fan Bingbing
- Cinematography: Conrad W. Hall
- Edited by: John Gilbert
- Music by: Joseph Metcalfe; John Coda; Grant Kirkhope
- Production companies: Bliss Media; Brookwell McNamara Entertainment; Lightstream Pictures; Pandemonium Films; Firstep Productions; Exosphere Entertainment
- Distributed by: Gravitas Ventures
- Release date: January 21, 2022
- Running time: 94 minutes
- Countries: Australia; China; United States
- Language: English
- Budget: $40 million
- Box office: $2.2 million

The King's Daughter is a 2022 action-adventure fantasy film directed by Sean McNamara, from a screenplay by Barry Berman and James Schamus. It is based on the 1997 novel The Moon and the Sun, by Vonda N. McIntyre. It stars Pierce Brosnan as King Louis XIV, Kaya Scodelario as Marie-Josèphe, and Benjamin Walker as Yves De La Croix. It was William Hurt's final screen performance to be released before his death in March 2022, though it had been filmed eight years prior.

Principal photography began in early April 2014 in Versailles, France. After a two-week location shoot in France, production continued on April 23 in Melbourne, Australia. Shooting wrapped up at the end of May 2014.

Originally set to be released in April 2015, the film was delayed just three weeks prior. The film remained unreleased for over five years, until the distribution rights were acquired by Gravitas Ventures, which released it theatrically on January 21, 2022, to negative reviews.

== Plot ==
Marie-Josèphe, born and raised in a convent in France, is a rebellious free spirit who often causes trouble for the Abbess. Marie-Josèphe's father, King Louis XIV, fears for his own mortality after being wounded by an assassin's bullet, but is told by Dr. Labarthe about a magical underwater creature that can grant him immortality; the procedure involves cutting out the creature's heart during an eclipse. Louis sends a group of fishermen, led by Captain Yves De La Croix, to capture the creature, a mermaid. Her mate is also caught, but Yves releases him before heading back to France.

Per the king's request, father La Chaise travels to the convent to bring Marie-Josèphe back, giving her the impression that she is traveling to play music in Versailles. Upon arriving in Versailles, Marie-Josèphe befriends a servant named Magali, but no one else knows she is the king's daughter. The following morning, Louis meets with Jean-Michel Lintillac, son of a wealthy baron who is gravely ill and ready to pass on, making Lintillac inherit a fortune and prestige. While out for a stroll with Magali, Marie-Josèphe meets Yves, and the two fall in love. She also encounters Lintillac and her father for the first time, though he still doesn't tell her about his relation to her.

The mermaid is brought into a chamber beneath the castle. Later, as Marie-Josèphe tries to practice in her room, she follows a strange noise to the mermaid's prison, where she encounters both the creature and Yves. At a grand ball the next day, Marie-Josèphe shares a dance with Louis, and later finds him outside painting a picture of a woman called Louise, telling Marie-Josèphe that she reminds him of her.

Louis appoints Lintillac with the title of Duke, and later holds a dinner in his honor. Marie-Josèphe visits the mermaid again and joins her underwater. Yves later takes Marie-Josèphe for a horse ride, but she falls and severely breaks her arm; Labarthe states that the arm will need to be amputated. Yves brings Marie-Josèphe and Magali to the mermaid, who completely heals Marie-Josèphe's arm. Marie-Josèphe assumes that Louis has brought the mermaid to France to heal the citizens, but she is told that the mermaid is for the king's purpose only.

Louis arranges for Lintillac to marry Marie-Josèphe so that they can share in Lintillac's fortune. He comes clean to Marie-Josèphe about being her father and that he wants her to marry Lintillac. She refuses and runs away crying, leaving Louis feeling remorseful.

La Chaise visits the mermaid and, realizing she is a sentient being, he confronts Labarthe and Louis. He pleads with Louis not to kill the mermaid as doing so would condemn his soul as the mermaid is clearly one of God's creations due to being a sentient being. However, both refuse to change their minds. Marie-Josèphe visits the mermaid, who shows her a telepathic vision of her capture. Meanwhile, Yves slips a picture of the procedure under Marie-Josèphe's door, alerting her to the king's true plans. She confronts Louis, telling him that she will marry Lintillac if he lets the mermaid go, but he refuses. As everyone prepares for the wedding, La Chaise and Marie-Josèphe go to the chamber where Yves is trying to get the mermaid out. They are found by Labarthe, but they fight him off to give the mermaid time to escape. Labarthe shoots Yves, who falls into the water and is taken along by the fleeing mermaid. Marie-Josèphe gets Labarthe caught in a water wheel that pulls him underwater, drowning him.

Marie-Josèphe makes it to a cliff where she has promised to rendezvous with Yves and his crew, and finds Yves healed by the mermaid. Louis and his men arrive and prepare to kill the mermaid as the eclipse approaches, but giving him the choice to save either his own life or hers, Marie-Josèphe jumps off the cliff and hits the water hard. Louis has no choice but to tell his men to stand down so that the mermaid can revive Marie-Josèphe. Louis watches Marie-Josèphe and Yves leave, and the mermaid swims home. La Chaise tells Louis he is now a great king and a great man.

In the epilogue, Marie-Josèphe and Yves sail to find the city of Atlantis so that Marie-Josèphe may reunite with the mermaid, and she takes her underwater to see the city up close.

== Cast ==
- Pierce Brosnan as King Louis XIV
- Kaya Scodelario as Marie-Josèphe
- Benjamin Walker as Yves De La Croix
- William Hurt as Père La Chaise (Note: This was Hurt's final film role released in his lifetime before his death, though it had been filmed many years prior.)
- Rachel Griffiths as Abbess
- Pablo Schreiber as Dr. Labarthe
- Fan Bingbing as the Mermaid
- Ben Lloyd-Hughes as Jean-Michel Lintillac
- Paul Ireland as Benoit
- Crystal Clarke as Magali
- Julie Andrews as the Narrator
- Earl Gough as the Horseman
- Brando Monne as Pietro
- Terry Norris as Great Chamberlain

== Production ==
The film is based on the 1997 novel The Moon and the Sun, written by Vonda N. McIntyre. The earliest development for the film began in 1999, when producer Michael London planned to acquire filming rights. He said he was drawn to "the weird juxtaposition (of) a completely imagined creature in this very specific historical world". London proposed the film to The Jim Henson Company, who would release the film through their film company, Jim Henson Pictures. Theatre director Christopher Renshaw signed on to direct, while Laura Harrington would write the screenplay with McIntyre's involvement. Stephanie Allain and Kristine Belson signed on as executive producers for Jim Henson Pictures. Following Sony terminating their joint venture with The Jim Henson Company, thus ending Jim Henson Pictures, production was shelved until film producer Bill Mechanic joined production and revived the film with Walt Disney Pictures after signing a five-year deal with the company in December 2001. Mechanic planned for the film to start pre-production in early 2002, with Natalie Portman to star, James Schamus to revise the script, and Gregory Hoblit to possibly direct. The Jim Henson Company would also remain as a producer.

By August 2013, Sean McNamara was hired direct the film. The casting included Pierce Brosnan as King Louis XIV, Fan Bingbing as the mermaid, and Bill Nighy as Père De La Chaise, a character created for the movie. Nighy pulled out of the film due to a scheduling conflict and was replaced by William Hurt weeks before filming. Mechanic, still remaining on the film, had also revised the script with Barry Berman and Ronald Bass. The Chinese film company Kylin Films invested $20.5 million in the film, making it China's biggest financial contribution to a non-studio film produced outside China. Julie Andrews was cast as the narrator of the film.

Principal photography on The Moon and the Sun began in early April 2014 on location at the Palace of Versailles, France. After the two-week shoot in France, production moved to Australia for shooting at Docklands Studios Melbourne and on location in Melbourne, Victoria. Filming commenced on April 23 in and around Melbourne Docklands. From May 6 to 8, filming took place at the Melbourne City Marina on the tall ship Enterprize for scenes set on board a ship in the Northern Sea on a stormy night in 1648. On May 2, scenes were filmed in Old Quad at the University of Melbourne, with the set transformed into Versailles abbey. Filming in Australia wrapped up at the end of May.

== Release ==
Originally set to be released by Focus Features, Paramount Pictures announced the release date for the film as April 10, 2015, while international sales were to be handled by Good Universe. Just three weeks before the film was due for wide release, Paramount cancelled without specifying a future release date. A source close to the film claimed that more time was needed to complete the special effects work. The film was later retitled The King's Daughter. In May 2017, Open Road Films bought the distribution rights. The distribution rights ended up going to Open Road's successor Global Road Entertainment before Global Road dropped the film. In June 2020, Arclight Films acquired distribution from Open Road during the Cannes virtual event. The following year in October, Gravitas Ventures acquired distribution rights to the film, and scheduled its release for January 21, 2022.

The film was released for VOD on April 5, 2022, followed by a Blu-ray and DVD release on April 19.

== Reception ==
=== Box office ===
In the United States and Canada, the film earned $723,150 from 2,170 theaters in its opening weekend, and made $440,846 in its second weekend.

=== Critical response ===
On the review aggregator website Rotten Tomatoes, 20% of 65 critics' reviews are positive, with an average rating of 4.2/10. The website's consensus reads: "A muddled mess that was clearly tinkered with in post-production to little avail, The King's Daughter is a royal disappointment." Metacritic, which uses a weighted average, assigned the film a score of 31 out of 100, based on 18 critics, indicating "generally unfavorable" reviews. Audiences polled by PostTrak gave the film a 66% positive score, with 33% saying they would definitely recommend it.
