= City Girl (1984 film) =

The City Girl
- Directed by: Martha Coolidge
- Written by: Martha Coolidge; Leonard-John Gates; John MacDonald; Judith Thompson
- Produced by: Peter Bogdanovich; Colleen Camp; Martha Coolidge
- Starring: Laura Harrington; Joe Mastroianni; Carole McGill
- Cinematography: Daniel Hainey
- Edited by: Éva Gárdos; Linda Leeds
- Music by: Marc Levinthal; Scott Wilk
- Distributed by: Moon Pictures
- Release date: 1984
- Running time: 85 minutes
- Countries: Canada; United States
- Language: English
- Budget: $CAD650,000

The City Girl is a 1984 film directed by Martha Coolidge. The film was produced in 1982, but not completed until 1984. The film screened at BERLINALE in 1984, but has never received an official release.

== Plot ==
A female photographer who is engaged to a businessman investigates a cult in the local club scene. By living out some of her sexual fantasies, she faces the truth about her life and helps one of the cult's victims escape.

== Cast ==
Actor	Role
Laura Harrington	Anne
Joe Mastroianni	Joey
Carole McGill	Gracie
Peter Riegert	Tim
James Carrington	Steve
Colleen Camp	Rose
Rosanne Katon	Ira
