= The Dark End of the Street (1981 film) =

- Directed by: Jan Egleson
- Written by: Jan Egleson
- Produced by: Dian K. Miller
- Starring: Laura Harrington
- Cinematography: D'Arcy Marsh
- Edited by: Jerry Bloedow
- Music by: Marion Gillon; Tyrone Johnson
- Release date: June 10, 1981 (New York City)
- Running time: 90 minutes
- Country: United States
- Language: English

The Dark End of the Street is a 1981 American drama film written and directed by Jan Egleson and starring Laura Harrington.

== Cast ==
- Laura Harrington as Donna
- Henry Tomaszewski as Billy
- Michele Greene as Marlene
- Lance Henriksen as Jimmy
- Pamela Payton-Wright as Mary Ann
- Terence Gray as Ethan
- Ben Affleck as Tommy

== Production ==
The film was shot in Cambridge, Massachusetts.

== Release ==
The film was released in New York City on June 10, 1981.

== Reception ==
Vincent Canby of The New York Times gave the film a positive review, calling it "an extremely accomplished example of what used to be called slice-of-life drama, a kind of movie that seems to have fallen out of style recently."

Leonard Maltin awarded the film three stars, calling it "a realistic depiction of urban working-class lifestyle and problems."
