= Locus Award for Best Novel =

Literary award by the science fiction and fantasy magazine Locus

Winners of the Locus Award for Best Novel, one of several discontinued Locus Awards, awarded by Locus magazine. Awards presented in a given year are for works published in the previous calendar year.

The award for Best Novel was presented from 1971 (when the awards began) to 1979. Since 1980, awards have been presented for Best Science Fiction Novel and Best Fantasy Novel.

== Winners ==
Year	Work	Author	Ref.
1971	Ringworld	Larry Niven	
1972	The Lathe of Heaven	Ursula K. Le Guin	
1973	The Gods Themselves	Isaac Asimov	
1974	Rendezvous with Rama	Arthur C. Clarke	
1975	The Dispossessed	Ursula K. Le Guin	
1976	The Forever War	Joe Haldeman	
1977	Where Late the Sweet Birds Sang	Kate Wilhelm	
1978	Gateway	Frederik Pohl	
1979	Dreamsnake	Vonda N. McIntyre	
