= Fireflood and Other Stories =

1979 collection of short work by Vonda N. McIntyre

- First edition cover
- Author: Vonda N. McIntyre
- Cover artist: Charles Shields
- Language: English
- Genre: science fiction short stories
- Publisher: Houghton Mifflin
- Publication date: 1979
- Publication place: United States
- Media type: Print Hardcover, Paperback
- Pages: 281
- ISBN: 0-395-28422-8

Fireflood and Other Stories is the first collection of short work by Vonda N. McIntyre, published in hardcover by Houghton Mifflin in 1979 and reprinted in paperback by Timescape Books in 1981. UK editions were issued by Gollancz in 1980 and by Pan Books in 1982; it was also issued by the Science Fiction Book Club. Fireflood placed fifth in the annual Locus Poll for best collection.

== Contents ==
- "Fireflood" (F&SF 1979)
- "Of Mist, and Grass, and Sand" (Analog 1973)
- "Spectra" (Orbit 11 1972)
- "Wings" (The Alien Condition 1973)
- "The Mountains of Sunset, the Mountains of Dawn" (F&SF 1974)
- "The End’s Beginning" (Analog 1976)
- "Screwtop" (The Crystal Ship 1976)
- "Only at Night" (Clarion 1971)
- "Recourse, Inc." (Alternities 1974)
- "The Genius Freaks" (Orbit 12 1973)
- "Aztecs" (2076: The American Tricentennial 1977)

== Reception ==
Thomas M. Disch gave the collection a mixed review, noting the "literary failings" of a talented but inexperienced writer. He faulted McIntyre's work for manifesting "two extraordinary features", which he suggested contributed to her success with her "chosen audience": first, "a worldview that divides everyone into an uncaring, imperceptive, closed-minded Them and a loving, hip, holistic, and victimized Us"; second, "a tendency toward tears." He praised McIntyre as "a talented storyteller [and] a writer who works at perfecting her craft and extending her range," singling out her ability to "write spare, modulated prose of varying intensity."
