= Perfect Witness =

- Home video cover art
- Written by: Terry Curtis Fox; Ron Hutchinson
- Directed by: Robert Mandel
- Starring: Brian Dennehy; Aidan Quinn; Stockard Channing; Laura Harrington; Delroy Lindo; Joe Grifasi
- Composer: Brad Fiedel
- Country of origin: United States
- Original language: English

Production
- Producer: Elaine Sperber
- Cinematography: Lajos Koltai
- Editor: Wendy Greene Bricmont
- Running time: 103 minutes
- Production companies: Granger Productions; HBO Pictures

Original release
- Network: HBO
- Release: October 28, 1989

Perfect Witness is a 1989 American made-for-television thriller film directed by Robert Mandel and written by Terry Curtis Fox and Ron Hutchinson. The film stars Brian Dennehy, Aidan Quinn, Stockard Channing, Laura Harrington, Delroy Lindo and Joe Grifasi. The film premiered on HBO on October 28, 1989.

== Plot ==
A witness to a mob killing has second thoughts about testifying when he realizes his family might become a target.

== Cast ==
- Brian Dennehy as James Falcon
- Aidan Quinn as Sam Paxton
- Stockard Channing as Liz Sapperstein
- Laura Harrington as Jeanie Paxton
- Delroy Lindo as Berger
- Joe Grifasi as Breeze
- Ken Pogue as Costello
- Markus Flanagan as Woods
- David Margulies as Rudnick
- Nial Lancaster as Danny Paxton
- James Greene as Paddy O'Rourke
- Colm Meaney as Meagher
- Tobin Bell as Dillon
- Tony Sirico as Marco
- Sam Malkin as Stefano
- Kevin Rushton as Rikky
- David Cumming as Kevin O'Rourke
- David Proval as Lucca
- Christopher Trace as Eddie Wallis
- David Christopher Adamson as Newton
- Jennifer Pearson as Jeanie's Sister
