= Barbary (novel) =

1986 novel by Vonda McIntyre

- First edition
- Author: Vonda McIntyre
- Cover artist: N. Taylor Blanchard
- Language: English
- Genre: Science fiction novel
- Publisher: Houghton Mifflin (hb), Ace Books (pb)
- Publication date: 1986 (hb), 1988 (pb)
- Publication place: United States
- Media type: Print (hardback & paperback)
- Pages: 192 (hb), 183 (pb)
- ISBN: 978-0441048861
- LC Class: PZ7.M478656 Bar 1986

Barbary is a 1986 science fiction novel written by Vonda McIntyre about an orphan and her cat moving to a space station. It is considered one of the best science fiction stories of the decade for children and young adults.

== Plot summary ==
Barbary, a twelve-year-old girl, is an orphan who has lived in several group homes and foster families since the death of her mother. The novel opens with her waiting in a spaceport for a seat on a shuttle to Earth orbit, which will be the first step on a journey to the research space station Einstein, where she is to live with her new foster father, Yoshi, a poet and college friend of her mother's. Unfortunately, she has two difficulties: the shuttle is filled with dignitaries from Earth travelling to the station, so it's unlikely she will get a seat, and she is trying to smuggle her cat, Mickey, into space with her (pets are forbidden on the station).

Barbary gets a seat on the shuttle with the help of the station's new administrator, a famous African-American woman astronaut, who tells her the reason so many VIPs are on the shuttle: an alien spacecraft has entered the Solar System. It is not responding to communications or making any transmissions, nor is it making any powered maneuvers, but its course will bring it close to Einstein.

Once she reaches orbit, Barbary spends several days on an orbital transfer ship before finally arriving at Einstein while managing to keep Mickey hidden. Once there, she meets Yoshi; Heather, her new sister, who is the first child born in space; and Thea, Yoshi's lover, an absent-minded astronomer. She hides Mickey in her and Heather's shared room, but has to reveal him to her fairly quickly. Heather agrees to help her keep Mickey hidden and fed while showing her around her new home and taking her on a trip outside the station in a vehicle called a "sled."

Barbary asks Heather if she knows any private places on the station where Mickey can move about more freely so he won't be bored. Heather shows them a radiation shielding sublevel of the station on the outer edge of its rotating ring; it is filled with dirt made from lunar regolith tailings from the station's construction. While there, Mickey crawls into a mistakenly-open access panel to an elevator shaft and the girls lose him. They are reunited when the station administrator later summons Barbary to the station control center, where Mickey has emerged, to the delight of the technicians. Initially the administrator wants to send Mickey back to Earth, but relents when a technician discovers a dead rat that Mickey has found and killed, proving he might be useful to the station as pest control.

In the meantime, Thea has been constructing a telescope instrument in the family's quarters which is to be put on a sled and sent toward the alien craft, which has finally made a course change to bring it near Einstein and has sent transmissions in many human languages. When Heather and Barbary are elsewhere on the station, Mickey climbs inside the instrument package, and is not noticed when the package is installed on the sled and sent off into space. Barbary figures out he is not on the station when the station computer tells her it can't detect the radio tracking tag on his collar. She and Heather take Heather's sled out and begin chasing after Mickey's sled, but when they catch up, both sleds are grabbed by tractor beams and pulled aboard the alien ship. The girls learn that the friendly aliens, which look like mobile crystalline columns, have been traveling through the galaxy for a billion years, and have come to the solar system to inform humanity of the rules of galactic society before humanity finds it first. The novel ends with the aliens beginning to take the girls back to their home.

== Setting details ==
The future world of Barbary features a space infrastructure inspired by the work of Gerard K. O'Neill. Lunar material is mined on the Moon and sent into Earth orbit by mass driver, where it is used to construct space colonies. The situation on Earth, however, appears to be somewhat bleaker than that of the time of the novel's writing. It is mentioned that Barbary has never eaten beef and has almost been caught up in riots, that she has only ever seen animals like cows in zoos, that few people in cities keep pets any more, and that travel into the wilderness requires difficult-to-obtain permits.

In the novel we meet the Secretary-General of the United Nations, Ambassador Begay, a Navajo woman who was once leader of the "United Tribes of North America". However, Barbary also encounters "the vice-president" and "Secret Service" agents, presumably from a future United States, although this is not stated, nor what its relationship with the UTNA is. It is mentioned that the space settlements have representatives at the UN.

The novel contains many details about aspects of life in space and on the space station, especially on the effects of zero gravity and spin gravity.
