= Superluminal (novel) =

1983 novel by Vonda McIntyre

Superluminal is a novel by Vonda McIntyre published in 1983.

== Plot summary ==
Superluminal is a novel in which pilots operate faster-than-light spacecraft.

== Reception ==
Dave Langford reviewed Superluminal for White Dwarf #52, and stated that "A pleasant and gentle book which could have been triffic [sic] with a touch more SF plausibility."

Dave Pringle reviewed Superluminal for Imagine magazine, and stated that "Romantic SF, with a much harder edge than the works of Anne McCaffrey."

== Reviews ==
- Review by Faren Miller (1983) in Locus, #271 August 1983
- Review by Frank Catalano (1984) in Amazing Science Fiction, January 1984
- Review by Tom Easton (1984) in Analog Science Fiction/Science Fact, March 1984
- Review by Philip E. Smith, II (1984) in SF & Fantasy Review, March 1984
- Review by Baird Searles (1984) in Isaac Asimov's Science Fiction Magazine, April 1984
- Review by Mary Gentle (1984) in Interzone, #8 Summer 1984
- Review by Brian Stableford (1984) in Foundation, #31 July 1984
