= Army Medical Department regimental coat of arms =

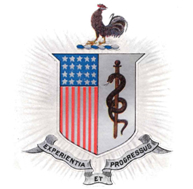
U.S. Army Medical Department (AMEDD) regimental coat of arms, ca. 1863.

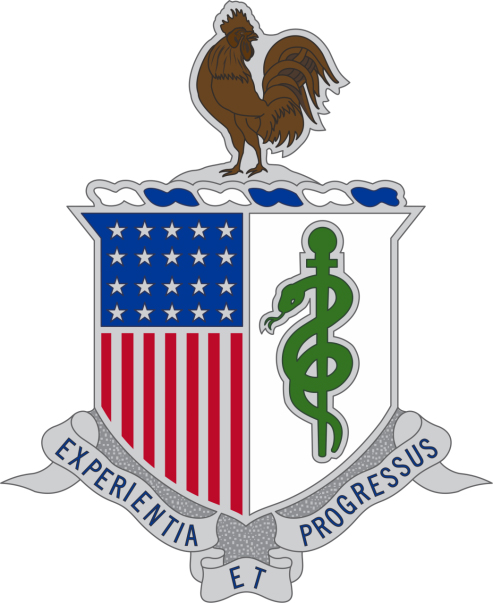
The AMEDD Regimental Insignia (derived from the coat of arms) in its new (2014) revised version.

The regimental coat of arms of the Army Medical Department of the United States Army—known as the AMEDD—is an heraldic emblem dating back, with slight variations, to about 1863. Since 1986, it has formed the basis of the AMEDD's distinctive unit insignia: the emblem worn by all AMEDD soldiers on their service uniforms.

== Description and history ==
The Medical Department regimental coat of arms was devised at the direction of Army Surgeon General William Alexander Hammond around 1863 and is one of the Army's oldest regimental emblems. Its iconography and design harkened back to 1818, which is the year Congress created a permanent Army "Medical Department", as opposed to the ad hoc organizations that had existed before. The 20 white stars on a blue background and the red and white stripes represent the U.S. flag of 1818. The green staff entwined with a green serpent combined two symbols: the Rod of Aesculapius from classical mythology, symbolic of medicine and healing; and the color green associated with US Army regular physicians during the last half of the 19th century. The colors Argent (silver/white) and Gules (red) are those associated with the flag of the United States.

The rooster is also associated with Asclepius/Aesculapius, the ancient Greek and Roman god of healing and medicine. The ancient Greeks believed that the rooster's crowing at dawn drove away the evil disease spreading demons from the temples so that it could be a place of healing. (The rooster had a strong connection with medicine in classical times. A practice at the time was to pay for medical services with poultry. On May 7, 399 B.C., Socrates died of judicially mandated poisoning by drinking hemlock. His last recorded words were said to be "I owe a cock to Aesculapius, see that it is paid.") The torse (twisted rope) below the rooster shows alternating blue and silver colors which were the colors of the Army in 1818. The Latin motto Experientia et Progressus ("Experience and Progress") is meant to convey the steady and unfailing progress of the Army Medical Department since its original incarnation as the "Army Hospital" in July 1775.

== AMEDD Regimental Distinctive Insignia ==
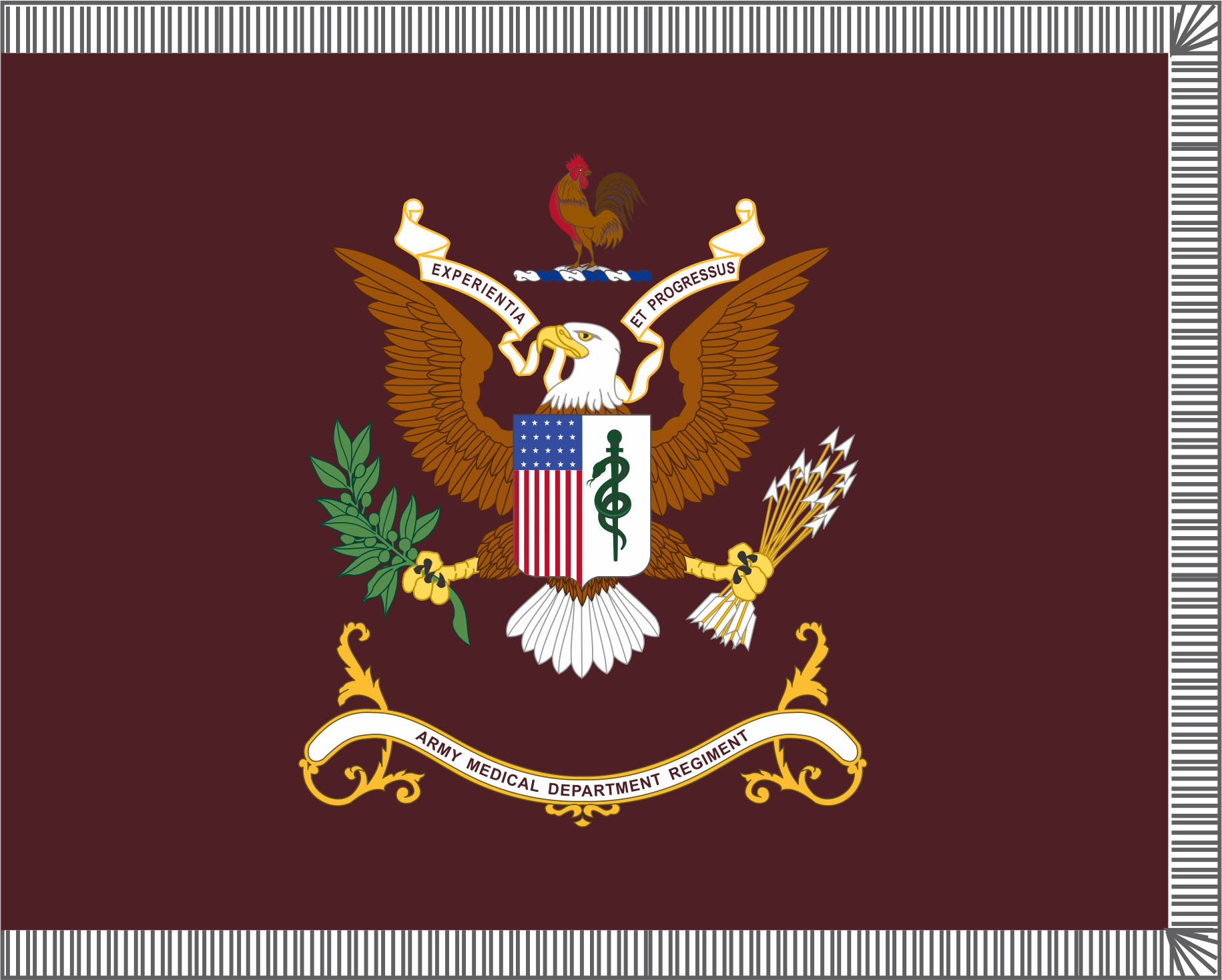
The U.S. Army Medical Department Regimental Flag incorporates all elements of the AMEDD CoA.

The AMEDD's Regimental Distinctive Insignia is worn by US Army soldiers affiliated with the Army Medical Department (AMEDD). In 1986 the Army established the Regimental Affiliation Program. Combat Service Support (now Sustainment) soldiers were affiliated with their newly established regiments and regimental distinctive insignia were created to represent those regiments. The AMEDD Regimental Distinctive Insignia incorporated the shield from the AMEDD regimental coat of arms and the motto ("To Conserve Fighting Strength") of the Medical Field Service School's (established 1920) distinctive unit insignia. The AMEDD Regimental Distinctive Insignia is one of the Army's 14 regimental corps insignias. These insignias are worn over the right breast pocket on the Army Service Uniform (ASU) and signify the service member's branch of service. The current design of the AMEDD regimental distinctive insignia was approved on 27 October 2014.

=== Variations ===
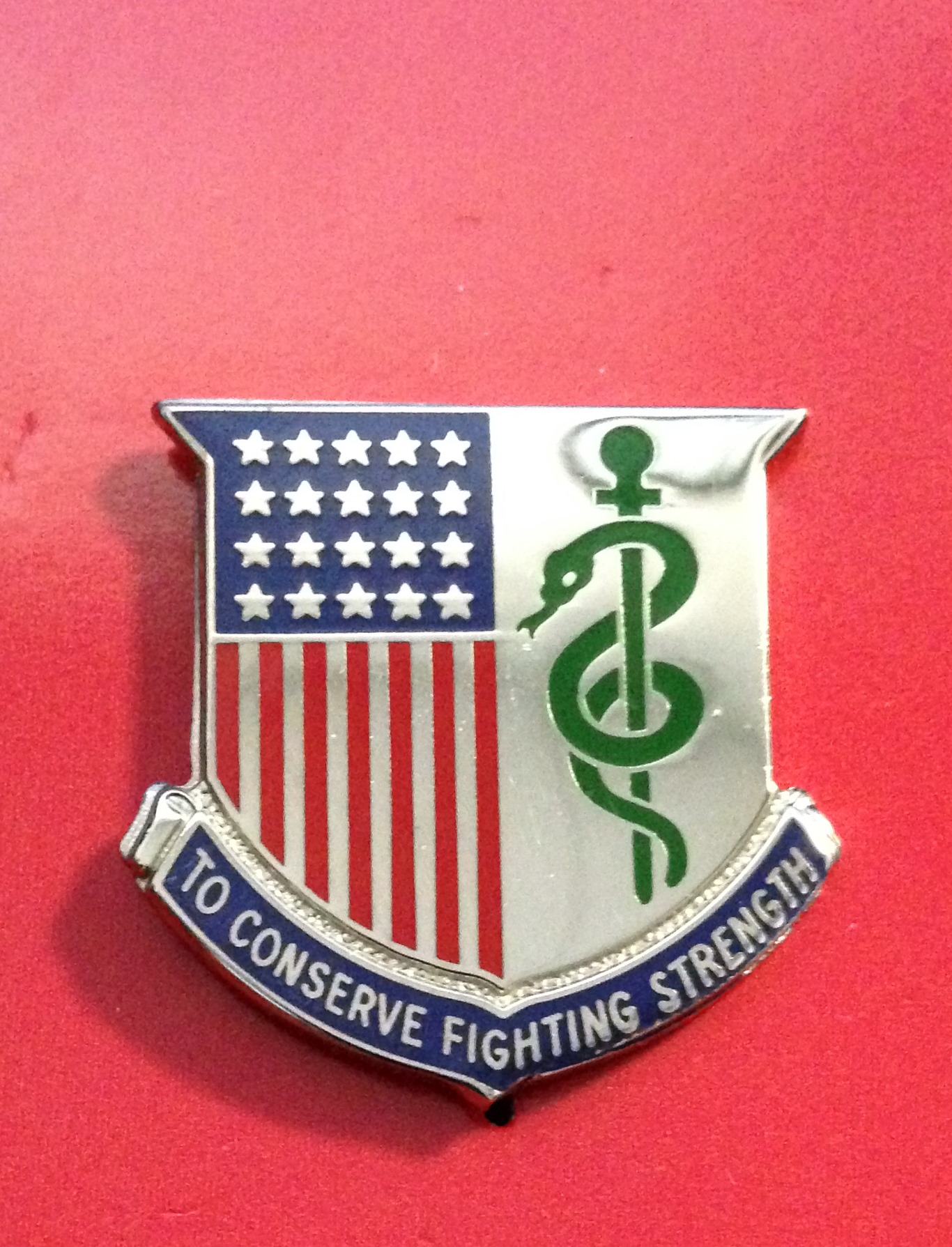
The AMEDD RDI, 1986 version.

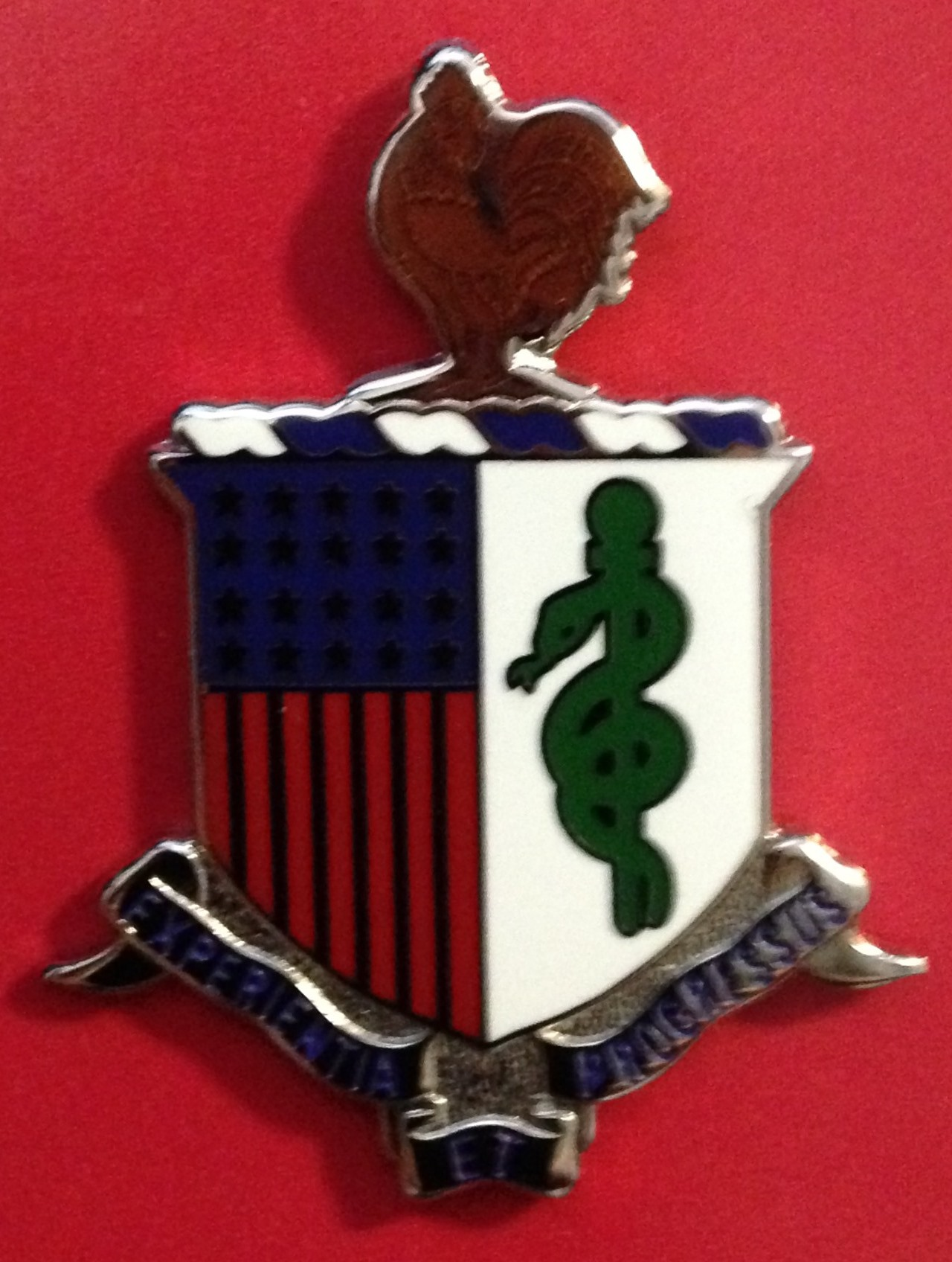
The AMEDD RDI, 2014 version.

== See also ==
- United States Army Institute of Heraldry
