= Caduceus as a symbol of medicine =

Misunderstanding of the symbol of Hermes

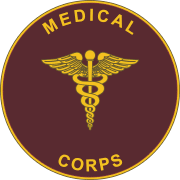
The US Army Medical Corps Branch Plaque. The adoption, in 1902, of the caduceus for US Army medical officer uniforms, popularized use of the symbol in the medical field in the United States.

The caduceus, depicted as a staff entwined by two snakes and often topped with wings, is the traditional symbol of the Greek god Hermes. Hermes was the god of trade, deception, thievery, eloquence, negotiation, and alchemy, with no traditional association with healing or medicine.

Medicine's traditional symbol, by contrast, is the Rod of Asclepius, a plain staff wound by a single serpent and named for Asclepius, the Greek god of medicine and healing. Predominantly in the United States, however, the caduceus became associated with medicine in the late 19th and early 20th centuries, a result of misunderstandings of classical iconography.

== Early use in a possible medical context ==
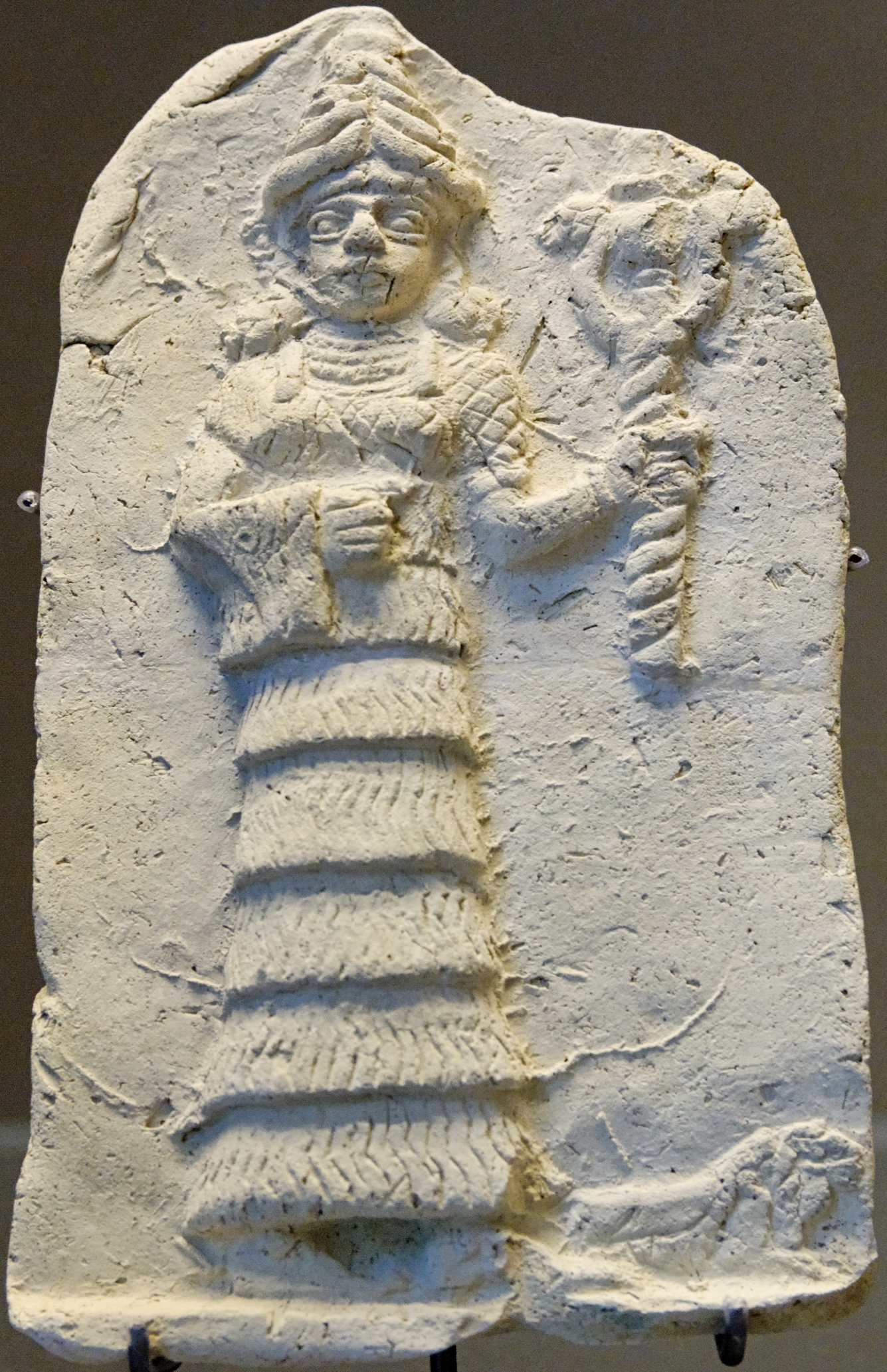
Babylonian terracotta relief of Ishtar from Eshnunna (early second millennium BCE)

Before the ancient Romans and Greeks (about 2612 BCE), older representations from Syria and India of sticks and animals looking like serpents or worms are interpreted by some as a direct representation of traditional treatment of dracunculiasis, the Guinea worm disease.

While there is ample historical evidence of the use of the Caduceus, or Herald's Staff, to represent Hermes or Mercury (and by extension commerce and negotiation), early evidence of any symbolic association between the Caduceus and medicine or medical practice is scarce and ambiguous. It is likely linked to the alchemical "universal solvent", Azoth, the symbol of which was the caduceus.

The Guildhall Museum in London holds a 3rd-century oculist's seal with Caduceus symbols both top and bottom. The seal was apparently used to mark preparations of eye medicine. It is believed likely that rather than being evidence of a medical association per se, this is rather an allusion to the words of the Greek poet Homer who described the Caduceus as "possessing the ability to charm the eyes of men", which relates to the business of an oculist.

Walter Friedlander proposed that early association of the Caduceus with medicine might have derived from the association of Hermes Trismegistus ("Thrice-Great Hermes") with early chemistry and medicine as aspects of alchemy as an esoteric practice. He notes that "there are very definite connections between medicine and (Hermes)-Thoth, who later became known as Hermes Trismegistus. [...] although these various factors may link Hermes/Mercury, along with his Caduceus, with alchemical medicine, they may just as well link all the other non-medical aspects of alchemy with Hermes/Mercury and the Caduceus".

Despite a long tradition of interpretatio graeca (the tendency of the ancient Greeks to identify foreign deities with their own gods), determination of the equivalence of deities is a complex matter. The role of Hermes in the afterlife was limited to guiding souls of the deceased, whereas the powerful Egyptian god Thoth was truly lord of the underworld and master of death. Together with Osiris, he presided over the panel of forty-two divine judges that assessed the souls of the deceased for reward or punishment in the afterlife. Thoth was at times depicted with two staves encircled by one cobra each, which might well have influenced the iconography of Hermes' caduceus. However, in ancient Egypt the snake staff represented the attribute of a powerful sorcerer, not a merchant or messenger. Compared to Hermes, Thoth was associated much more with magic and with potent actions preserving balance in the divine world, than with the unpredictable whims of a trickster deity.

Depictions similar to the caduceus also occurred in bronze age Mesopotamia as devotional emblems for various major or minor deities, or as snakes embodying the deity itself. Ancient examples of attributes similar to the caduceus, or to aspects of Hermes' portfolio of divine roles, include the Sumerian messenger and snake god Nirah, the occasional depictions of the major goddess Innana holding a scepter with two winding snakes (which lacked the wings of a caduceus), and the benevolent Egyptian goddess Wadjet who was often depicted as a winged cobra.

If the caduceus was inspired by and adapted from an amalgam of serpent depictions in other cultures, probably with changes in explanatory myths and divine prerogatives, then Greek mythology might well have created an exaggerated impression that the origins of the caduceus were entirely separate from those of the rod of asclepius. From the perspectives of ethnography and literary history, their cultural and iconographic origins were probably deeply entwined as part of the complex and artistically fluid history of snakes as deities or as divine symbols for healing, magic and protective rituals.

== Medieval times ==
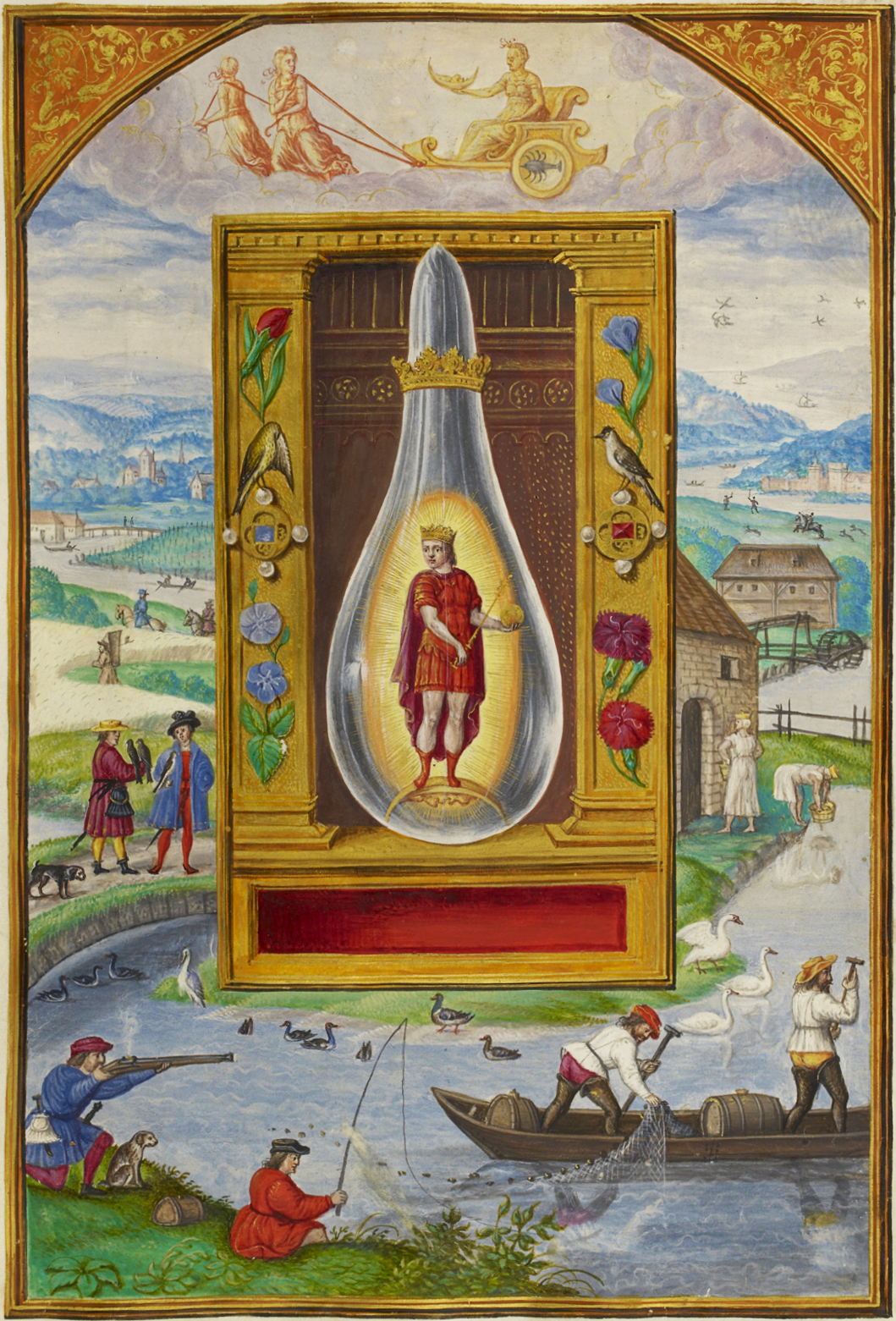
The spirit of medicine, as imagined by Salomon Trismosin, 1582

The Caduceus became a symbol of alchemy and pharmacy in medieval Europe. Its first appearance as a medical symbol can be traced back to 1st−4th century CE in oculists' stamps that were found mostly in Celtic areas, such as Gaul, Germany and Britain, which had an engraving of the name of the physician, the name of the special medicine or medical formula and the disease for which the medicine was to be used.

Medieval alchemy used the Caduceus to represent preparations containing quicksilver, later known as mercury. Quicksilver (named mercurius philosophorum) was believed to be the basis of all substances and this element has been represented by the caduceus for many centuries.

Based on the medieval European use of the caduceus to signify pharmacy, Bavarian printer Erhard Ratdolt used the caduceus in his medical manuscripts from 1486 CE. Others followed (not uncontroversially, see section Modern times below). Sir William Butts, physician to Henry VIII, was the first physician to adopt it as his emblem. The rod of Asclepius, since the 5th century CE, resurfaced in 1544 CE. A publication of the medical writings of Avicenna, a Persian physician, had it at the frontispiece.

== Modern times ==
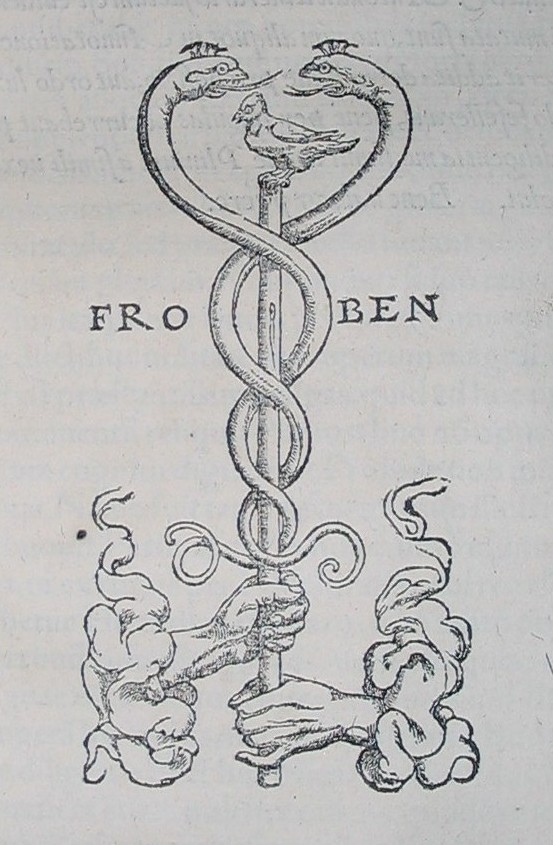
The printer's device of Johann Froben.

Beginning with the 16th century there is limited evidence of the use of the caduceus in what is arguably a medical context. However, this evidence is also ambiguous. In some cases it is clear that the caduceus symbolized wisdom, without any specific medical connotations.

The caduceus appears in a general medical context in the printer's device used by the Swiss medical printer Johann Frobenius (1460–1527), who depicted the staff entwined with serpents and surmounted by a dove, with a biblical epigraph in Greek, "Be ye therefore wise as serpents and harmless as doves" (Matthew 10:16, here in the KJV translation), in keeping with the connotations of the caduceus as a symbol of messengers and publishers based on the association of Hermes or Mercury with eloquence and negotiation. Friedlander observed that Frobenius could hardly be considered a medical printer, as had previously been asserted, noting that in a review of 257 of the works bearing this printer's device only one was related to medicine. Similar use of the caduceus in printers' marks continues to the present day, with companies including F. A. Davis Company still using the symbol as an element of their insignia.

There are a few other examples of use in this period. It may have been used as a symbol by Sir William Butts, physician to Henry VIII. Similarly, physician John Caius, founder of Caius College, Cambridge, and at the time President of the Royal College of Physicians, during official visits to his eponymous college, had carried before him a silver caduceus on a cushion, and later presented this artefact to the college, where it remains in the college's possession. This use was adduced by the medical historian (and primary apologist for the use of the caduceus in a medical context) Fielding Garrison to support his argument that the caduceus was used as a symbol of medicine as far back as the 16th century. However, as Walter Friedlander noted, "what Caius used was a non-specific herald's wand, rather than the caduceus of Hermes." In support of this assertion he quotes Caius's own words on why he chose a herald's wand as a symbol, making it clear that he chose it as a symbol of prudence. This same passage was also earlier referenced by Engle in refuting Garrison's claim. Engle and Friedlander are not the only ones to have noted that the use of the Caduceus by Caius had nothing to do with supposed medical symbolism; as indicated in a publication produced by the Royal College of Physicians itself: "[...] by introducing the caduceus into the ceremony of the College of Physicians, Caius unintentionally added to the confusion between the two emblems for later times, when few people understand the visual signs with which he was so familiar."

In support of the idea that the caduceus had a long-standing association with medicine, Garrison also mentioned the fact that the English medical printer Churchill used the symbol as a printer's device, beginning some time around 1844. Friedlander has examined this subject in detail, and shows that Churchill was well aware that the rod of Asclepius was the accepted symbol of medicine. He is, it seems, inclined to think that the adoption of the caduceus in this context probably had something to do with the relation between publishing and the role of Mercury as a messenger and scribe. He notes, however

That John Churchill adopted the caduceus as his printer's device independent of any idea that it symbolized medicine does not mean that, once having adopted it, it did not play some role in the caduceus coming to be accepted as a symbol of medicine, at least in the United States. During the remaining part of the nineteenth century several United States publishers appear to have copied or modified Churchill's caduceus and placed this mark on their medical books. Other contemporary British publishers did not use a caduceus and the caduceus had never been as widely connected to medicine in Great Britain or in Europe as it has been in the United States.

— Walter J Friedlander, The Golden Wand of Medicine: A History of the Caduceus Symbol in Medicine

In any case, in Great Britain, as late as 1854, the distinction between the rod of Asclepius and the caduceus as symbols of two very different professions was apparently still quite clear. In his article On Tradesmen's Signs of London A.H. Burkitt notes that among the very old symbols still used in London at that time, which were based on associations between pagan gods and professions, "we find Mercury, or his caduceus, appropriate in trade, as indicating expedition. Esculapius, his Serpent and staff, or his cock, for professors of the healing art".

== Adoption by the US military ==
The flag of the Surgeon General of the United States Army, depicting the Caduceus.

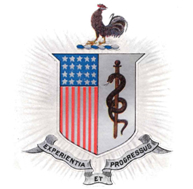
Army Medical Department regimental coat of arms (1863) uses the Rod of Asclepius

Widespread confusion regarding the supposed medical significance apparently arose as a result of events in the United States that occurred in the second half of the 19th century. As pointed out by Garrison, the caduceus had appeared on the chevrons of Army hospital stewards as early as 1856 (William K. Emerson indicates the insignia was adopted earlier, in 1851). It has been asserted that this was a result of ignorance or misinterpretation regarding the pre-existing designation of the rod of Asclepius by the Surgeon General of the United States for this purpose. Hospital stewards were not physicians; they played a supporting role preparing drugs for surgeons, supervising nurses and cooks, maintaining accounting and medical records, and in emergencies sometimes performed minor surgery or provided prescriptions.

Later, in 1871, the Surgeon General designated the caduceus as the seal of the Marine Hospital Service (destined to become the U.S. Public Health Service in 1912). Gershen states that the change was for aesthetic reasons, whereas Friedlander states the caduceus was adopted by the Marine Hospital Service "because of its relationship with merchant seamen and the maritime industry".

The caduceus was formally adopted by the Medical Department of the United States Army in 1902 and was added to the uniforms of Army medical officers. According to Friedlander, this was brought about by one Captain Frederick P. Reynolds, although Bernice Engle states "the use of the caduceus in our army I believe to be due chiefly to the late Colonel Hoff, who has emphasized the suitability of the caduceus as an emblem of neutrality. Reynolds had the idea rejected several times by the Surgeon General, but persuaded the new incumbent — Brig. Gen. William H. Forwood — to adopt it. This resulted in considerable controversy.

The Army and Navy Register of 28 June 1902 discusses the argument, which reflects the fact that a number of medical officers were unhappy with the choice. The article editor claims that the symbol was not chosen for its medical connotations and proposes the following symbolic interpretation: "the rod represents power, the serpents stand for wisdom and the two wings imply diligence and activity, qualities which are undoubtedly possessed by our Medical officers." The editor also points out that the majority of Medical Corps personnel are not even doctors. According to this line of reasoning, the caduceus was never intended to be a symbol of medicine. The inconsistency was noticed several years later by the librarian to the Surgeon General, but for reasons which are not entirely clear, the symbol was not changed.

Considerable light is shed on this confusion by an anonymous letter republished by Emerson, a historian of United States Army insignia and uniforms. He indicates that the April 1924 issue of The Military Surgeon printed a review of an earlier article that appeared in the Presse Médicale in which the author stated "There is nothing in history to justify the use of the caduceus as the emblem of the physician [...] it is most unfortunate that the 'confusion' exists." In an anonymous rebuttal contained in a letter to the editor published three months later in The Military Surgeon it was claimed that the late Col. John R. van Hoff was a member of the board that selected the emblem ("if he was not the one who was chiefly instrumental in its adoption"). In the letter to the editor reproduced by Emerson, the anonymous author claims

Hoff was far too scholarly and intelligent a man to commit the blunder of 'confusing' the caduceus with the serpent staff of Aesculapius. The sign of Mercury was deliberately adopted, as I have heard him state, because it was the emblem of the merchant and hence the emblem of the noncombatant. In junctures when it was necessary for a vessel to proclaim its nature, it was customary for a merchant vessel to indicate its noncombatant status by flying a flag which bore the emblem of Mercury, the God of the Merchant. The caduceus, in our use of it, is not distinctively the emblem of the physician, but the emblem of the whole Medical Department. The enlisted men of the medical department outnumber the physicians of that department. Besides the ambulance wagons, many vehicles are employed in field service in war which are not distinctively medical, but which are used for medical purposes. Both the enlisted men and the vehicles of the department (not to mention many other objects), should bear some sign of neutralization for protection. It seemed to Colonel Hoff and to the board that the Geneva cross, which in addition to its use as an emblem of neutrality is also the emblem of the Swiss Republic, there might well be substituted an emblem which is not the emblem of a foreign country, and the caduceus was selected, as the emblem which for many ages has served to indicate the noncombatant.

— William K Emerson, Encyclopedia of United States Army Insignia and Uniforms

According to this view the caduceus was not intended to be a medical symbol (and, though explained differently, this reflects the view advanced by the editor commenting in The Army and Navy Register of 28 June 1902 discussed above). Nevertheless, after World War I the caduceus was employed as an emblem by both the Army Medical Department and the Navy Hospital Corps. Even the American Medical Association used the symbol for a time, but in 1912, after considerable discussion, the caduceus was abandoned by the AMA and the rod of Asclepius was adopted instead.

The Army Medical Department (AMEDD) has included the Rod of Asclepius in its regimental coat of arms since its foundation in 1863. (Although now part of the AMEDD, the Army Medical Corps retains the caduceus for its own plaque and insignia.) The medical insignia of U.S. Air Force uses the rod of Asclepius.

== Contemporary views ==
The emergency medical services' Star of Life features a rod of Asclepius.

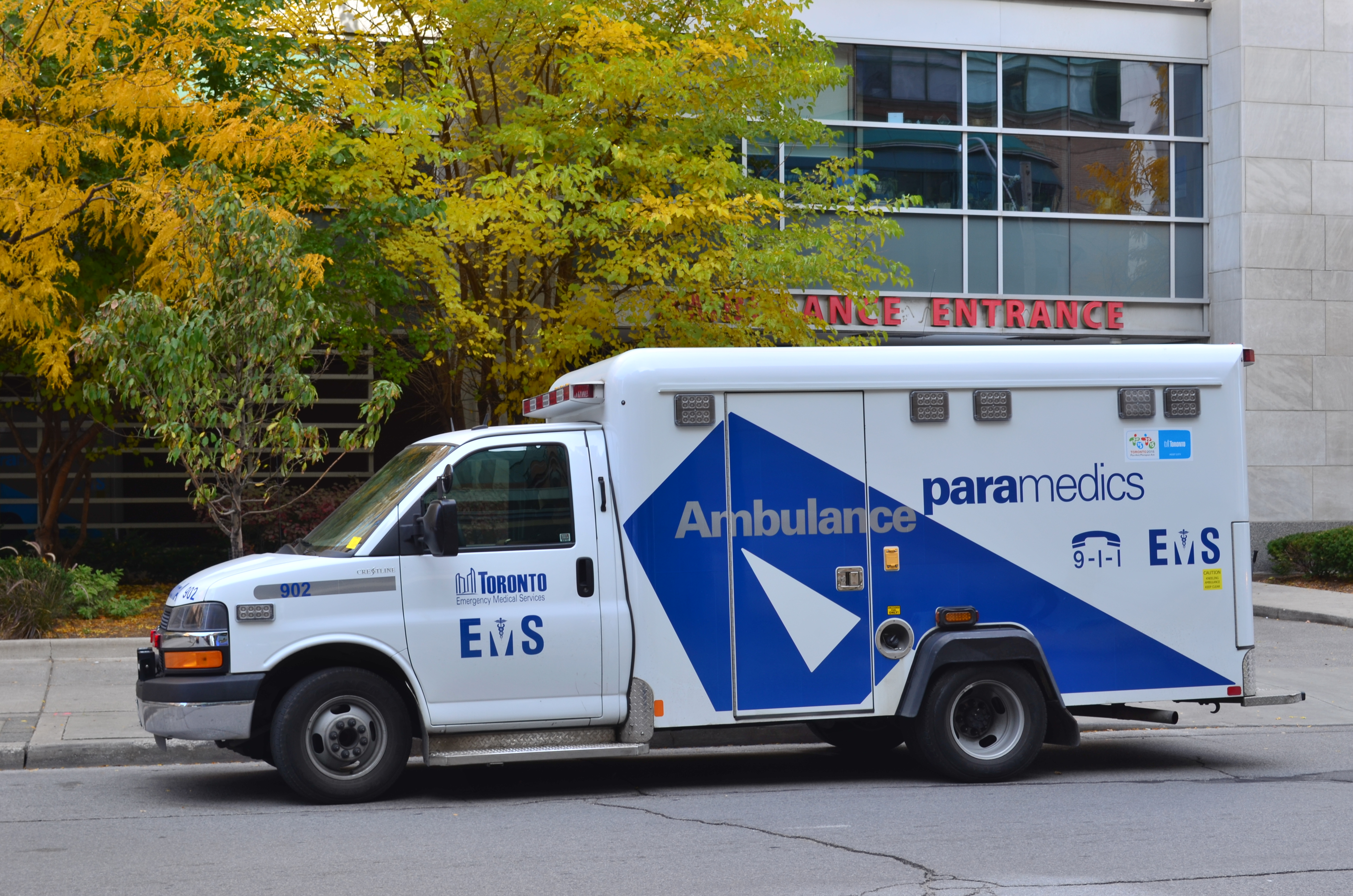
Toronto paramedic service ambulance in Ontario, Canada, with a caduceus in an EMS logo

Despite widespread acceptance of the caduceus as a medical symbol in the United States, it has been said that the rod of Asclepius has "the more ancient and authentic claim to be the emblem of medicine". Most attempts to defend the caduceus's use in a medical context date from the last quarter of the 19th century through the first quarter of the 20th, and have been characterized as "based on flimsy and pseudo-historical research".

In a survey of 242 logos used by organizations related to health or medicine, Friedlander found that professional associations were more likely to display the rod of Asclepius (62%), while organizations with a commercial focus were more likely to use the caduceus (76%). Hospitals were an exception (37% used a staff of Asclepius whereas 63% used a caduceus). Friedlander felt it likely that this might reflect the fact that "professional medical organizations have more often sought a real understanding of the meaning of the two symbols whereas commercial organizations have been less interested in the historical basis of their logo or insignia and more concerned with how well a certain symbol will be recognized by the iconographically unsophisticated audience they are trying to attract to their wares."

The use of the caduceus in a medical context has long been frowned upon by many professionals, academics and others who are familiar with the historical significance of both symbols. This has occasioned impassioned remarks by those frustrated with the continuing confusion.

It is hard to trust a profession that cannot even get its symbols straight. Most physicians in the United States think that the symbol of their profession is something called the caduceus. But this is actually not true. [...] Historians have discovered that someone in the U.S. Army Medical Corps mistook the caduceus for the Aesculapion and introduced the Medical Corps' symbol at the beginning of the twentieth century. Soon thereafter, everyone in the United States was emulating the mistake.

— Daniel P. Sulmasy, A Balm for Gilead: Meditations On Spirituality and the Healing Arts

It has been said that the caduceus is particularly inappropriate for use as a medical symbol due to its long associations with the Greek god Hermes, who was patron of commerce and traders as well as thieves, liars, and gamblers.

As god of the high-road and the market-place Hermes was perhaps above all else the patron of commerce and the fat purse: as a corollary, he was the special protector of the traveling salesman. As spokesman for the gods, he not only brought peace on earth (occasionally even the peace of death), but his silver-tongued eloquence could always make the worse appear the better cause. From this latter point of view, would not his symbol be suitable for certain Congressmen, all medical quacks, book agents and purveyors of vacuum cleaners, rather than for the straight-thinking, straight-speaking therapeutist? As conductor of the dead to their subterranean abode, his emblem would seem more appropriate on a hearse than on a physician's car.

— Stuart L. Tyson, "The Caduceus", in The Scientific Monthly

On the other hand, it has also been remarked – not without considerable irony – that commercial aims in medicine, especially in the United States of America, make the caduceus an appropriate symbol, at least for some physicians.

Well, so much for the caduceus. Somebody obviously got the wrong symbol for modern medicine–or did they? The caduceus seems to be an appropriate symbol for modern commercial medicine. Of particular relevance are the functions of escorting souls of the dead, wisdom, fertility, commerce, luck, eloquence, cheating and thieving. These have become symbolic of how medicine evolved in the late Twentieth Century.

— Luke Van Orden, Where Have All the Healers Gone?: A Doctor's Recovery Journey

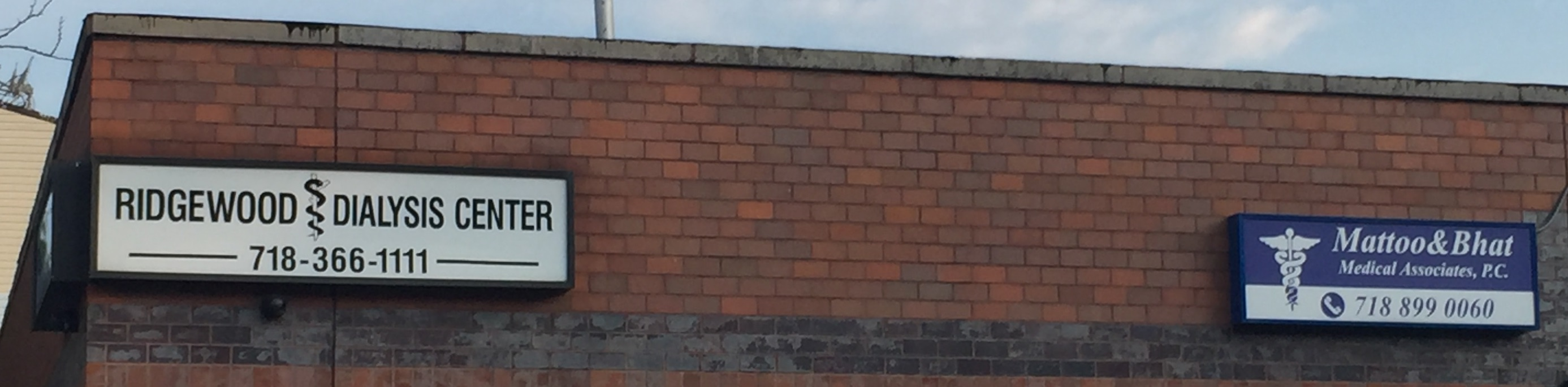
The Caduceus and the Rod of Asclepius as used by neighboring offices (Ridgewood, NY)

Others are unapologetic about the association of medicine with commerce, recognizing the importance of "advertising essential for competitive marketing", and suggesting that it is up to individual physicians to choose between the two symbols, based on their own views about what associations are appropriate. The AMA has used the Rod of Asclepius for over a century, and its current logo since 2005.

In North America, there are calls to clarify the symbol and to move to a uniform use of the rod of Asclepius. For example, the director of communications of the Minnesota Medical Association is quoted as saying, "If it's got wings on it, it's not really the symbol of medicine; some may find it hard to believe, but it's true. It's something like using the logo for the National Rifle Association when referring to the Audubon Society".

However, Andrew Weil, a proponent of alternative medicine, has suggested that the caduceus is appropriate as a medical symbol "because it embodies an esoteric truth that must be grasped to gain practical control over the shifting forces that determine health and illness."

== Notable modern users (as a symbol of medicine) ==
- All India Institute of Medical Sciences, New Delhi (established in 1956)
- United States Army Medical Corps (but not the US Army Medical Department)
- Northern Ireland Ambulance Service logo includes two serpents entwined around the stem of a flaming torch

== See also ==
- Aaron's rod – Staves carried by Moses's brother, Aaron, in the Torah
- Bowl of Hygieia – Symbol of pharmacy
- Nehushtan – Brass serpent in Torah
- Snakes in mythology – Serpent that only appears in myths and legends
- Skunked term – Word avoided due to problematic meanings
- Hippocratic Oath – Oath of ethics taken by physicians (to Asclepius and other healing gods)
