= The Moon and the Sun =

1997 novel by Vonda McIntyre

- Author: Vonda McIntyre
- Genre: Historical fiction
- Publisher: Pocket Books
- Publication date: 1997
- Pages: 421
- ISBN: 0-671-56765-9
- OCLC: 36649155

The Moon and the Sun is a novel by American writer Vonda N. McIntyre, published in 1997. The book combines two major genres: science fiction (specifically the alternate history subgenre) and historical romance. It won the Nebula Award for Best Novel in 1997, beating out A Game of Thrones by George R. R. Martin. The novel was inspired by the short story (written in the form of a faux-encyclopedia article) "The Natural History and Extinction of the People of the Sea", also by McIntyre, which was illustrated by fellow author Ursula K. Le Guin.

The novel was re-released as The King’s Daughter in 2021 as a tie-in with the film of that name based on the book.

== Plot summary ==
Set in 17th-century France at the court of the Sun King, King Louis XIV, the young, colony-raised, naïve Mademoiselle Marie-Josèphe de la Croix is the lady-in-waiting to King Louis XIV's niece. Her brother, Father Yves de la Croix (a natural philosopher and explorer), has recently returned from a mission commissioned by the king: to bring back the endangered sea monster whose flesh is rumoured to give the consumer immortality. Father Yves brings back two specimens: one, a dead male sea monster covered in sawdust and ice; the other, a live female sea monster placed in the Apollo fountain in the Palace of Versailles.

Acting as her brother's assistant, sketching the dead sea monster's dissection, and caring for the live specimen, Marie-Josèphe soon realizes the creature is not a sea monster, but a sea woman. Thus, Marie-Josèphe tries to convince the others at court, including her brother, that the sea woman is intelligent and hopefully free her. Unfortunately, only Marie-Josèphe can understand the sea woman (now called Sherzad) and her musical way of talking. As a result, the court ignores her.

They bleed her for hysteria, the pope openly shows outrage over the impropriety of her composing a cantata, and several court men harass her on the King's hunt. At the same time, her slave Odelette (really called Haleed) struggles to gain her freedom. Only the stoic Count Lucien believes Marie-Josèphe about the sea woman, calmly taking the sea woman and Marie-Josèphe's scientific endeavors in stride. In order to save her own life, Sherzad, the sea monster, offers the king the location of a sunken treasure ship in return for her freedom. But despite the discovery of Spanish gold found from the wreck, the king intends to keep Sherzad and eat her, the lure of immortality being too strong.

Marie-Josèphe and Count Lucien (whom she has fallen in love with) plot secretly to release Sherzad, defying the pope, their king and her brother. Their attempt fails, but Yves (finally realizing Sherzad's sentience and its repercussions on his actions) aids them in finally releasing Sherzad. In the end, Marie-Josèphe and Count Lucien are exiled, but Sherzad, who had declared vengeance on all humanity, showers them with forgotten sunken treasures in gratitude.

== Main character profiles ==
- Marie-Josèphe de la Croix - Lady-in-waiting to King Louis XIV's niece and the younger sister of Father Yves de la Croix. She is an amateur composer and lover of mathematics who was Convent-raised and, at first, naïve. As assistant to her brother in his scientific endeavors (mainly as a sketcher of specimens), she also shares her brother's interests in natural philosophy. She befriends the sea monster, later called Sherzad, and being the only one able to understand the sea monster, becomes her translator.
- Father Yves de la Croix - Marie-Josèphe's older brother. A Jesuit priest and King Louis's natural philosopher, he recently returned from an expedition commissioned by the King to find the legendary sea monster – the possible key to immortality. He is stuck between his religious obligations, his scientific endeavors, and his own pride. Yves is later revealed to be a bastard son of King Louis and thus Marie-Josèphe's half-brother.
- Count Lucien de Chretien - A dwarf who is an open Atheist and King Louis' most trusted advisor. The epitome of etiquette, he is Marie-Josèphe's love interest. He is stuck between his kindling feelings for Marie-Josèphe and his duty to his beloved King.
- Sherzad (the sea creature/sea woman) - One of the last sea monsters in the world, she is captured by Father Yves de la Croix and caged in the Apollo fountain in the Versailles for King Louis XIV. Her flesh is rumored to make the eater immortal. Her saliva is able to heal wounds, though this fact is not realized by the other characters. She has two tails, tangled hair, and a gargoyle face, as well as an enchanting voice, the music of which is her way of communicating. However, she can only communicate with Marie-Josèphe. She later vows vengeance on all humanity.

== Awards and recognitions ==
- Nebula Award for Best Novel (1997)
- A Publishers Weekly Best Book of 1997
- 1997 Locus Recommended Book
- James Tiptree Jr. Award Short-List choice
- Intergalactic Award for Best Novel (1997)
- Seiun Award nominee (2001)

== Film adaptation ==
A film adaptation was first planned in 1999 by producer Michael London. London brought the project to Jim Henson Pictures, who said he was drawn to "the weird juxtaposition (of) a completely imagined creature in this very specific historical world." The film was set to be directed by Christopher Renshaw, which would've been his feature film debut, and written by Laura Harrington with McIntyre's involvement. Stephanie Allain and Kristine Belson would executive producer from Jim Henson Pictures. Film producer Bill Mechanic later joined production and brought the film to Walt Disney Pictures after signing a five-year deal with the company in December 2001. Mechanic planned for the film to start pre-production in early 2002, with Natalie Portman to star and James Schamus to revise the script, with Gregory Hoblit to possibly direct. Following Sony breaking from the joint venture of Jim Henson Pictures in 1999, the film would be produced by The Jim Henson Company instead.

In August 2013, it was announced that Sean McNamara would direct the film, and that casting included Pierce Brosnan as King Louis XIV, Fan Bingbing as the mermaid, and Bill Nighy as Pere de Chaise, a character created for the movie. Nighy pulled out of the film due to a scheduling conflict and was replaced by William Hurt weeks before filming. The film began production on April 23, 2014, at Victoria, Australia, along with Docklands Studios Melbourne. Additional filming also took place in Versailles, France. Mechanic had also revised the script with Barry Berman and Ronald Bass. Chinese film company Kylin Films invested $20.5 million into the movie, making it China's biggest financial contribution to a non-studio film produced outside China.

Paramount Pictures acquired US distribution rights and set the movie for wide release on April 10, 2015, with international sales being handled by Good Universe. However, three weeks before the film's release, the film was pulled from its schedule. A source close to the film claimed that the film needed more time to complete the special effects work.

In October 2021, it was announced that Gravitas Ventures acquired distribution rights to the film, and set it for a January 21, 2022, release.
