= Vonda N. McIntyre =

American science fiction writer (1948–2019)

- Born: Vonda Neel McIntyre; August 28, 1948 Louisville, Kentucky, U.S.
- Died: April 1, 2019 (aged 70) Seattle, Washington, U.S.
- Occupation: Writer, biologist
- Education: University of Washington (BS)
- Genre: Science fiction

Website
- vondanmcintyre.net

Vonda Neel McIntyre (August 28, 1948 – April 1, 2019) was an American science fiction writer and biologist.

== Early life and education ==
Vonda N. McIntyre was born in Louisville, Kentucky, the daughter of H. Neel and Vonda B. Keith McIntyre, who were born in Poland, Ohio. She spent her early childhood on the east coast of the United States and in The Hague, Netherlands, and Poland, before her family settled in Seattle in the early 1960s.

In 1970, she earned a Bachelor of Science, with honors, in biology from the University of Washington. That same year, she attended the Clarion Writers Workshop. McIntyre went on to do graduate work at University of Washington in genetics.

== Career ==
In 1971, McIntyre founded the Clarion West Writers Workshop in Seattle, Washington, with the support of Clarion founder Robin Scott Wilson. She contributed to the workshop until 1973.

McIntyre won her first Nebula Award in 1973, for the novelette '"Of Mist, and Grass, and Sand". This later became part of the novel Dreamsnake (1978), which was rejected by the first editor who saw it, but went on to win both the Hugo and Nebula Awards. McIntyre became the third woman to receive the Hugo Award for Best Novel (1979).

McIntyre's debut novel, The Exile Waiting, was published in 1975. In 1976, McIntyre co-edited Aurora: Beyond Equality, a feminist/humanist science fiction anthology, with Susan Janice Anderson.

She also wrote a number of Star Trek and Star Wars novels, including Enterprise: The First Adventure and The Entropy Effect. The Entropy Effect was the first original story published in the Pocket Books' series of Star Trek novels, and was developed by McIntyre from a screenplay that she wrote at age 18. It convinced Pocket Books to assign McIntyre the novelizations of the next three films Star Trek II: The Wrath of Khan, Star Trek III: The Search for Spock, and Star Trek IV: The Voyage Home. McIntyre created given names of several Star Trek characters that later became canon, including Hikaru Sulu and Kirk's mother Winona. Sulu's given name became canon after Peter David, author of the comic book adaptation, visited the set of Star Trek VI: The Undiscovered Country, and convinced director Nicholas Meyer to insert the name into the film's script.

While taking part in a science fiction convention panel on sci-fi in TV, McIntyre became exasperated at a fellow panelist's extreme negativity toward existing science fiction TV shows. She asked the panel and audience if they had managed to see Starfarers, which she claimed was an amazing SF miniseries that had almost no viewers due to bad scheduling on the part of the network. No such show existed, but after reflecting on the plot she described, McIntyre felt it would make a good novel, and went on to write Starfarers as well as its three sequels, later referring to it as "my Best SF TV Series Never Made".

McIntyre's novel The Moon and the Sun, set in the court of Louis XIV, was rejected initially. In 1997, Pocket Books picked up the novel, and in 2013 Pandemonium Pictures began to produce The King's Daughter, featuring Pierce Brosnan as the Sun King. In October 2021, it was announced that Gravitas Ventures acquired distribution rights to the film, and set it for a January 21, 2022, release.

She was able to complete a final novel, Curve of the World, shortly before her death in 2019; the novel was edited by a team and published in 2026.

== Personal life ==
She enjoyed crafting crocheted marine creatures to contribute to the Hyperbolic Crochet Coral Reef project of the Institute For Figuring.

McIntyre died on April 1, 2019, at her home in Seattle, Washington, of metastatic pancreatic cancer, which was diagnosed in February.

== Legacy ==
In 2019, Clarion West established the Vonda N. McIntyre Memorial Scholarship, to enable women writers and writers of color to attend the Clarion West Writers Workshop and Writing the Other established the Vonda N. McIntyre Sentient Squid Memorial Scholarship, to help authors at any point in their career path and from every background, including those who don't have the money to pay for writing workshops.

== Awards and tributes ==
- "Of Mist, and Grass, and Sand": 1974 Nebula Award, nominated for the 1974 Hugo Award and the 1974 Locus Poll Award
- Dreamsnake: 1979 Hugo Award, 1979 Nebula Award
- Robert A. Heinlein dedicated his 1982 novel Friday, "to Vonda" (among many others).
- The Moon and the Sun: 1997 Nebula Award, nominated for the 1998 Locus Poll Award and the 1997 James Tiptree, Jr. Award
- "Little Faces": Nominated for the 2005 James Tiptree, Jr. Award, 2006 Sturgeon Award, and the 2007 Nebula Award
- McIntyre was a Guest of Honor at Sasquan, the 73rd World Science Fiction Convention.
