= UGR =

UGR may refer to:

- University of Granada
- Unified Glare Rating
- Unitized Group Ration
