= Ranger cookie =

American improvised confection

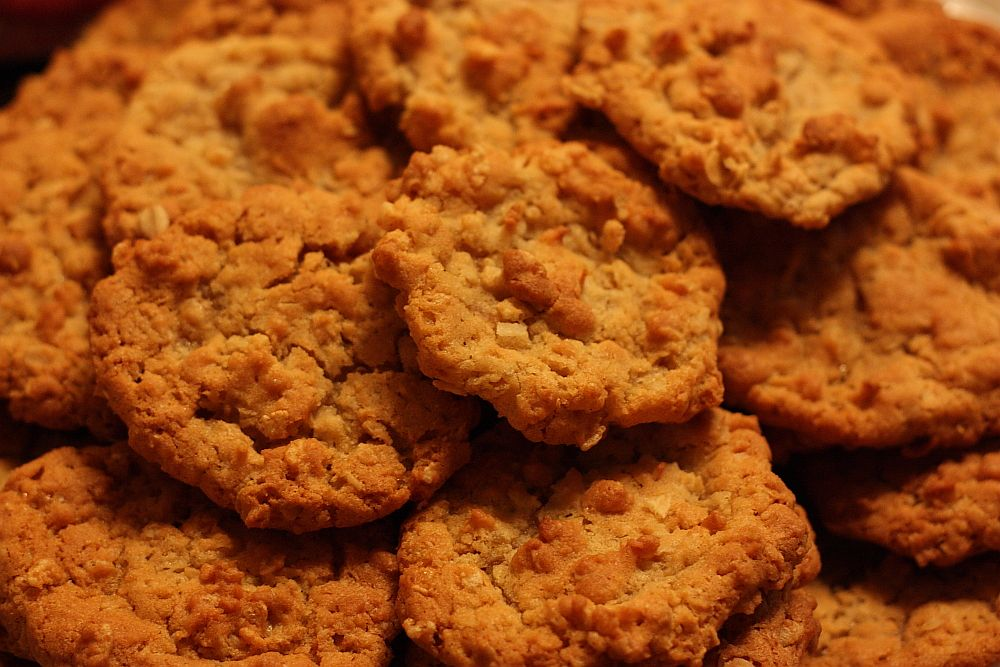
Camping-style ranger cookies

A Ranger cookie is a type of confection originating from the United States. It refers to two mostly distinct improvised confections: a drop cookie for camping, and a dulce de leche–like confection for the military.

== Camping-style cookie ==
The camping-style Ranger cookie is made with rolled oats, corn flakes, shredded coconut, and brown sugar. It is believed to originate from the mid-20th century, possibly in Texas, and is associated with camping food, hiking, summer camp, and fundraising events. It is similar in recipe, appearance, and name to cowboy cookies, and may have been a variation of it.

== Military-style confection ==
The military-style Ranger cookie is made using the contents of field rations issued to the United States Armed Forces, dating back to at least the introduction of the Meal, Ready-to-Eat (MRE) ration in the 1980s. The cookie uses the MRE's included packets of sugar, coffee creamer, and (optionally) cocoa beverage powder, which are mixed together in a single packet and baked over a campfire, portable stove, or ration heater for two to three minutes. It also appears to be included in some variants of the Unitized Group Ration. If the mixture used for the cookie is not baked, but instead water is added for it to become a paste, it creates Ranger pudding.

== Etymology ==
The etymology of the Ranger cookie is unclear, but the capitalization of "Ranger" suggests a formal title. In a 2009 article about the camping-style cookie's introduction on Harvard University's dining hall menus, The Harvard Crimson theorized that it may refer to the Texas Ranger Division, a state law enforcement agency in Texas. Other potential namesakes are forest rangers, for whom the Ranger cookie's simple and non-perishable qualities would theoretically be suitable. For the military-style cookie, the most likely namesakes are the United States Army Rangers, who may have created the cookie first and spread its recipe to other units and branches.

== See also ==
- Anzac biscuit
