= Yagai suigu =

The Yagai-suigu (野外炊具 field cooker) are movable cooking facilities equipped by the Japan Ground Self-Defense Force. They are used not only in field trainings but also in disaster relief operations.

== Yagai-suigu I ==
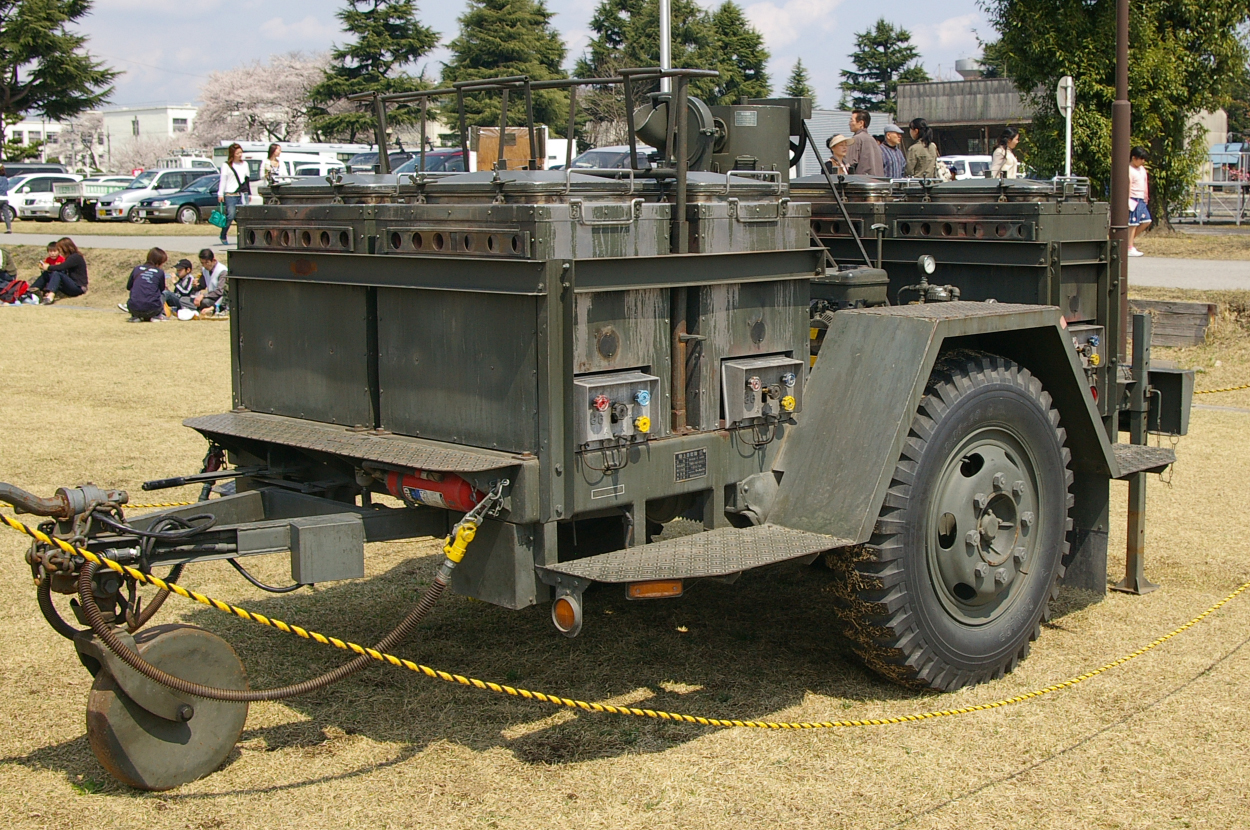
The Yagai-suigu I displayed at Camp Utsunomiya

The Yagai-suigu I (野外炊具1号) is a cooking vehicle introduced in 1962 (Shōwa 37). It can serve rice for 600 people or misoshiru for 1500 people at once with its six kerosene-powered furnaces.

In 2004 Chūetsu earthquake, about 160 Yagai-suigu I were sent out from all around Japan to the Niigata Stadium to help afflicted people.

=== Yagai-suigu I Modified ===
The Yagai-suigu I Modified (野外炊具1号（改）) is a modified version of the Yagai-Suigu I. It equips automated igniter, electric generator, cold boxes, and faucets to supply water into the kettles. Due to its electrical equipments, the Yagai-suigu I Modified has poor waterproofness and must be used indoors when it rains.

== Yagai-suigu II ==
The Yagai-suigu II (野外炊具2号) is a set of three kerosene-powered furnaces and fuel tanks and has the ability to serve 50 people. Unlike the Yagai-suigu I, the Yagai-suigu II is not a vehicle.

=== Yagai-suigu II Modified ===
Yagai-suigu II Modified (野外炊具2号（改）) includes wheeled furnaces with automated igniters, kettles, fuel tanks, water pumps, cold boxes, and a power generator.

== See also ==
- Field kitchen
