= Field kitchen =

Portable kitchen primarily used by militaries

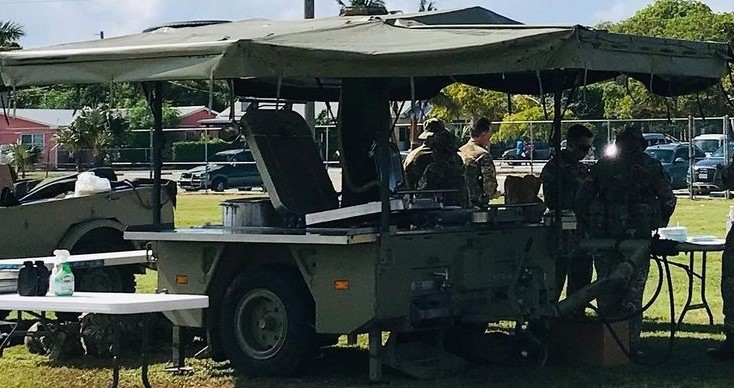
Modern field kitchen

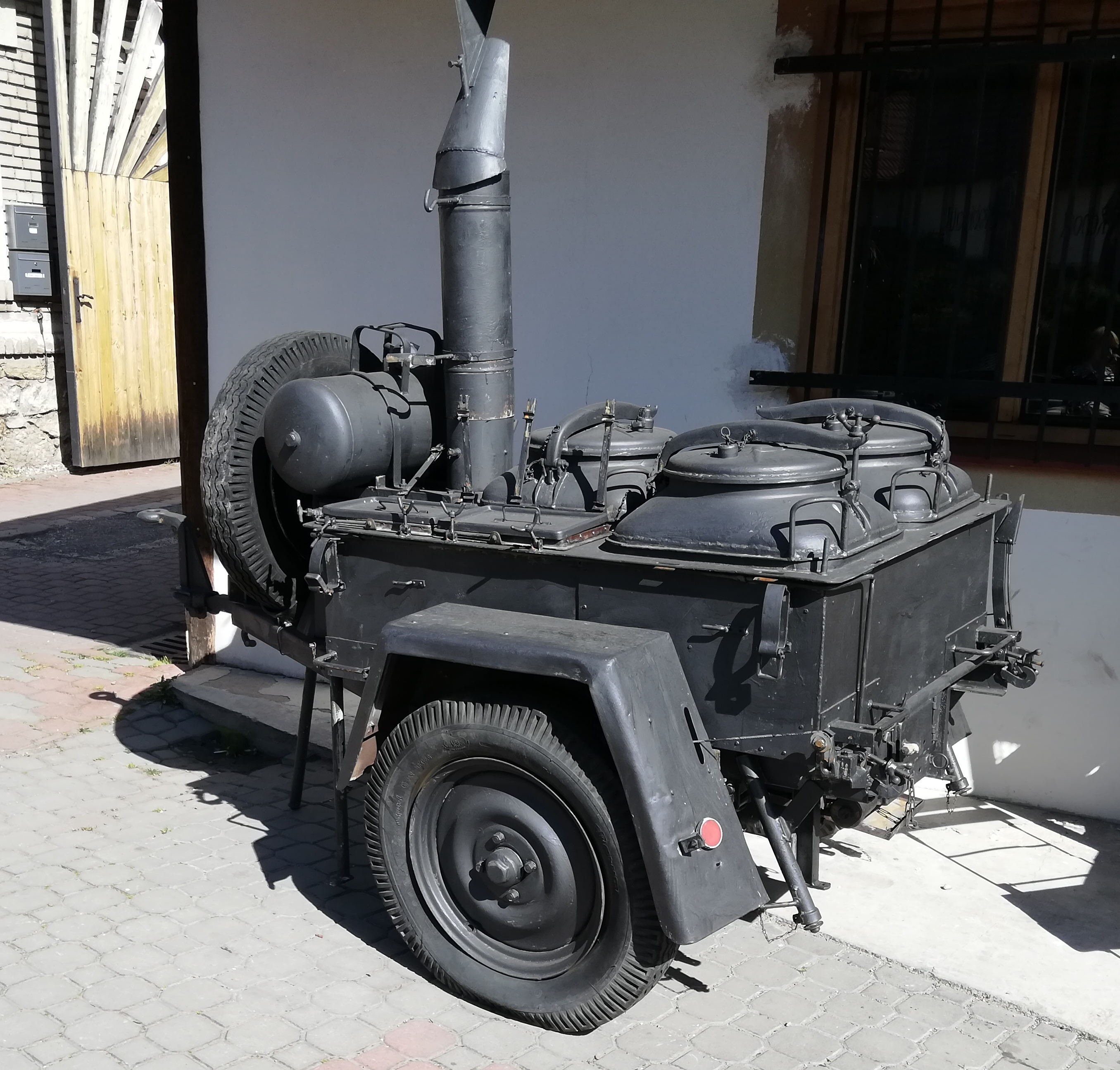
A World War II-era field kitchen used by the Czechoslovak Army

A field kitchen (also known as a battlefield kitchen, expeditionary kitchen, flying kitchen, or goulash cannon) is a kitchen used primarily by militaries to provide hot food to troops near the front line or in temporary encampments. Designed to be easily and quickly moved, they are usually mobile kitchens or mobile canteens, though static and tent-based field kitchens exist and are widely used.

== History ==
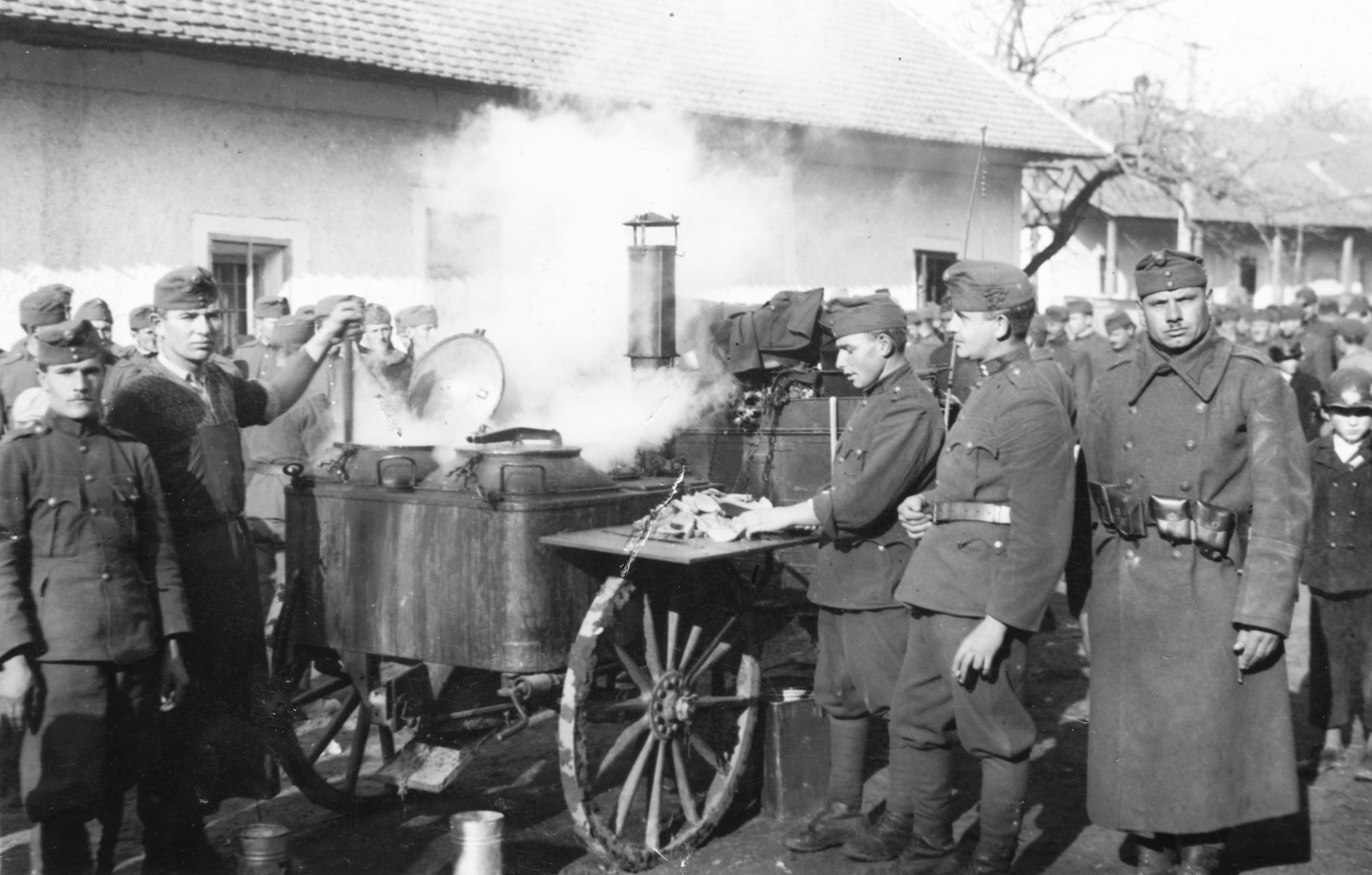
Royal Hungarian Army soldiers at a field kitchen in 1938

The first field kitchens were carried in four-wheeled wagons (such as chuckwagons) by military units on campaigns throughout history, often part of larger wagon trains, used as late as the 19th century. By the 20th century, smaller two-wheeled trailers became common, especially with the invention of the locomotive.

Karl Rudolf Fissler of Idar-Oberstein invented a mobile field kitchen in 1892 that the Germans came to refer to as a Gulaschkanone ("goulash cannon"), because the chimney of the stove resembled ordnance pieces when disassembled and limbered for towing. As technology advanced, larger trailers evolved as horses were phased out in favor of motorized vehicles more capable of towing heavier loads. In World War II, the mobile canteen was used as a morale booster in the United Kingdom, fitting in with the culture of the tea break and in particular as a result of the successful wartime experiment of the tea lady on productivity and morale. The larger mobile kitchens (now commonly called "flying kitchens" because of the greater speed with which they can be deployed) can service entire battalions of troops.

In the present, many field kitchens are mostly either mobile canteens or deployable field kitchens. Many of these have facilities similar to actual kitchen facilities and may be designed to serve either fresh meals or hot food rations intended to be prepared in a field kitchen.

== Types ==
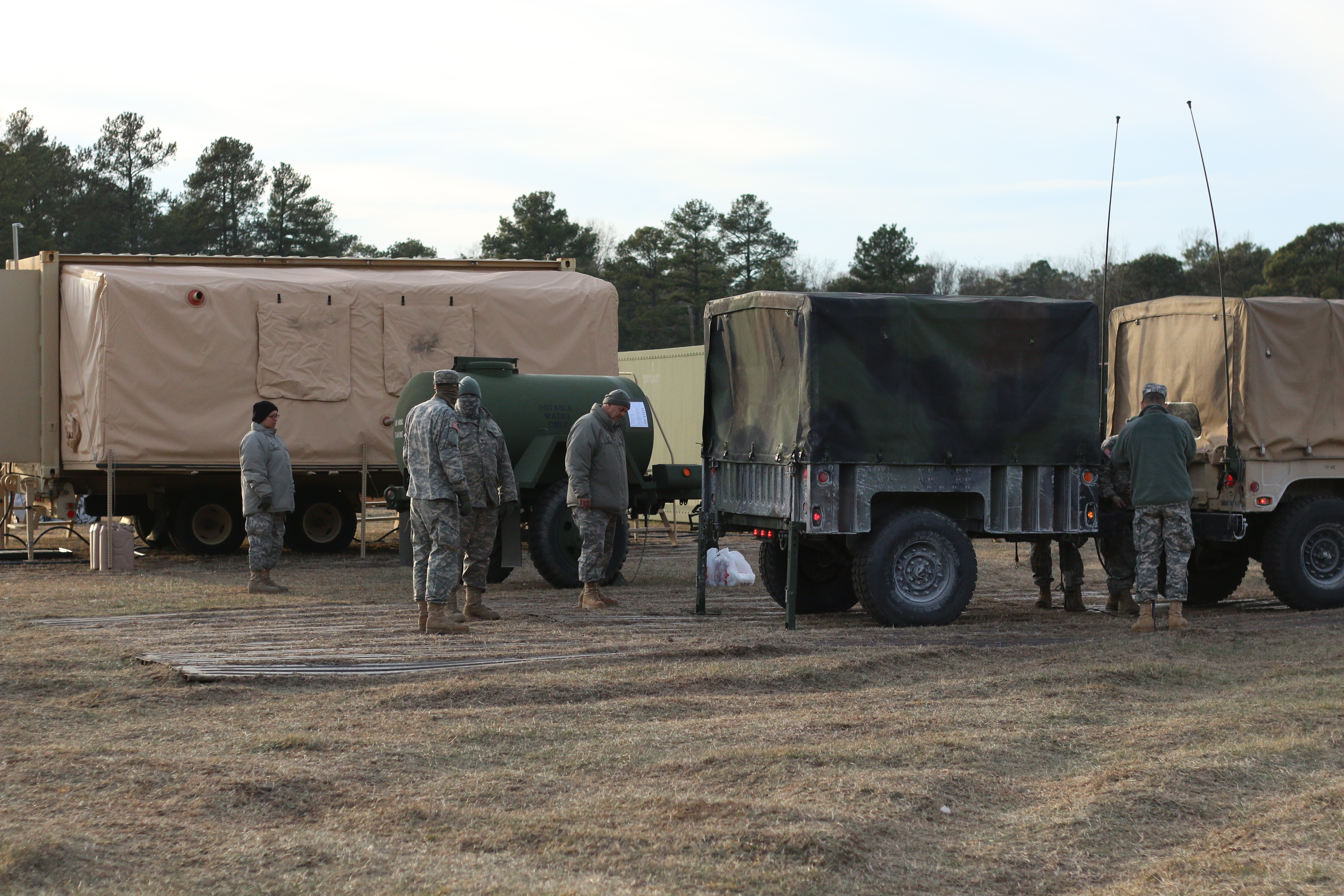
From left to right: containerized kitchen, trailer kitchen, assault kitchen

=== Trailer kitchen ===
A trailer kitchen, rolling kitchen, or chow wagon is a field kitchen that is or can be pulled by a vehicle, pack animal, or person in the form of a cart, wagon, or trailer. They typically have two or four wheels and may be a single unit, or two separate units connected to each other. Such trailers may have wheels with the intent that they are pulled to their destinations, or they may be assembled at their destination with the wheels only intended to make it easier to move around if needed. Most trailer kitchens are open-air, though some vehicle-towed trailer kitchens may be enclosed.

=== Assault kitchen ===
An assault kitchen or vehicle kitchen is a field kitchen that is installed in a vehicle. It is usually in the rear compartment of the vehicle, which may be a military light utility vehicle, a van, or a truck. They may function similar to a commercial food truck, or they may simply be a kitchen in the back of a vehicle without dedicated serving functions. Assault kitchens allow for meals to be prepared while moving (i.e. in a convoy) and without the need to wait for a field kitchen to be set up, allowing for the quick preparation and serving of hot meals to troops and, if necessary, the quick extraction of the kitchen and food supplies from a dangerous area.

=== Deployable kitchen ===
A deployable kitchen or camp kitchen is a field kitchen that is deployed as a static structure. Though they are not necessarily mobile kitchens, they are designed to be unpacked, assembled, and repacked with relative haste. They may be as small as a set of outdoor cooking equipment that can take only a few minutes to set up; as basic as folding tables with a portable kitchen range, ration heating unit, and food containers; or as large as a tent-based kitchen with a full set of appliances that may take up to an hour to fully set up for food preparation.

=== Containerized kitchen ===
A containerized kitchen, modular kitchen, or configurable kitchen is a field kitchen that is enclosed within, or in a similar configuration to, a freight container, typically a shipping container or semi-trailer. They are very similar to deployable kitchens, but larger, usually not assembled by hand, and intended to feed more individuals or prepare more types of food than what is possible with other types of field kitchens. They are typically modular buildings that can be expanded if necessary.

=== Other facilities ===
Some modern militaries use mobile facilities that are not field kitchens, but supplement them or are components of them, such as large tents for dining halls. The U.S. Defense Logistics Agency lists several such facilities used by the United States Armed Forces, including the Multi-Temperature Refrigerated Container System, a containerized freezer; the Food Sanitation Center, a dedicated dishwashing tent; and the Containerized Ice Making System, a containerized icemaker designed to mass-produce ice.

== Non-military use ==
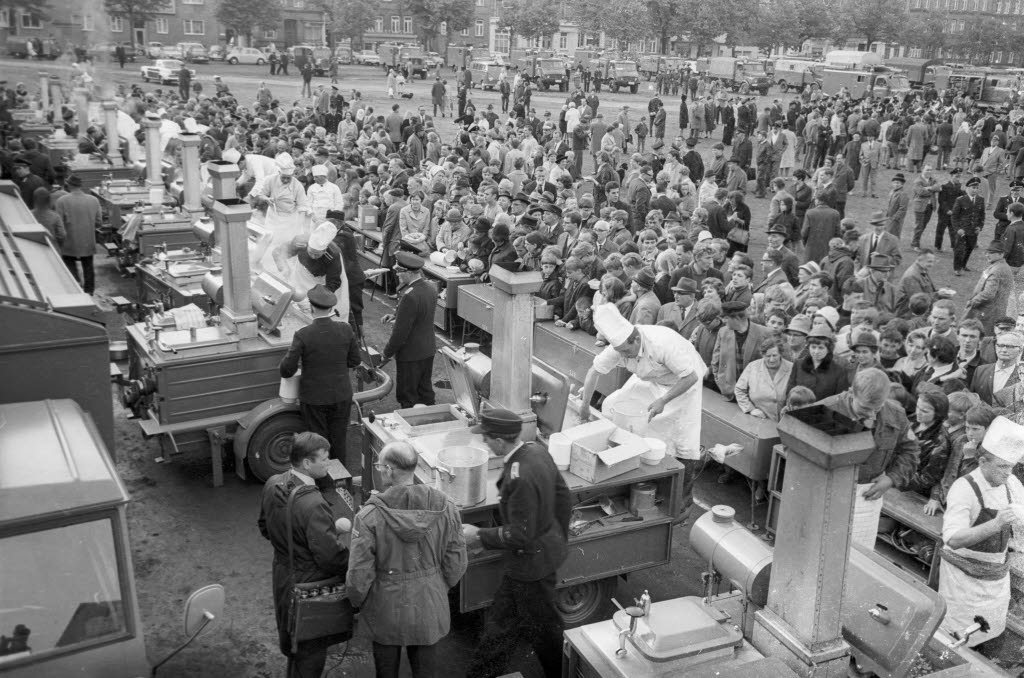
The Schleswig-Holstein Landesfeuerwehr providing catering using field kitchens in Kiel, 1968

Field kitchens are also used in non-military or non-combat roles. Field kitchens are deployed by militaries or aid agencies to feed groups of refugees, displaced persons, or first responders as part of humanitarian aid, disaster response, and emergency management operations. Field kitchens are also sometimes set up for historical reenactments, preferably with genuine field kitchen appliances or newer reproductions, though modern equivalents are sometimes used, especially if the field kitchen appliances fail or historic field kitchen models are unavailable.

Civilian versions of field kitchens have also been set up at events where dedicated food service facilities are unavailable, such as at protests; for example, several were set up in Maidan Nezalezhnosti during Euromaidan, and one was set up in Confederation Square during the Canada convoy protests.

== Gallery ==
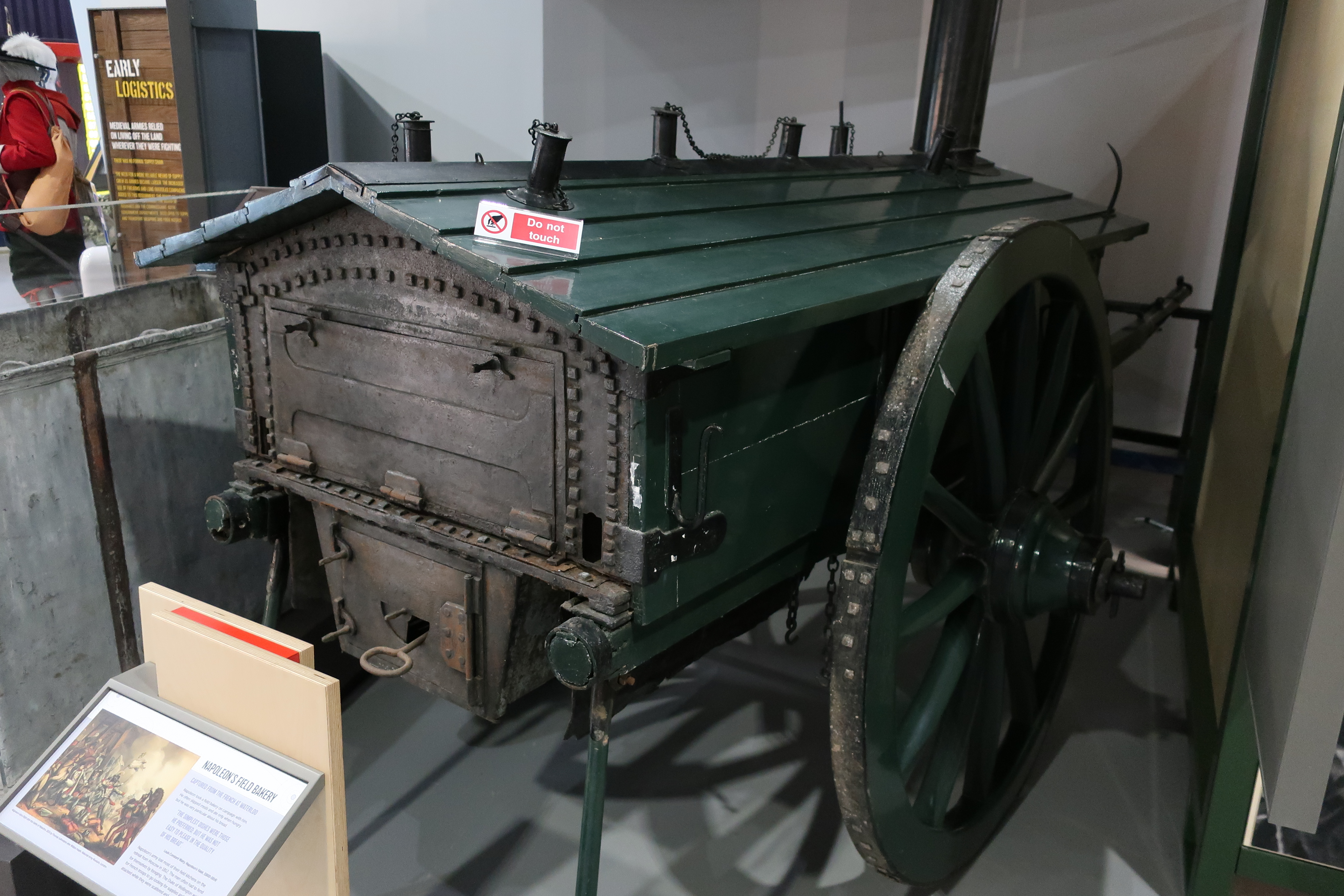
A field bakery used by the Grande Armée, captured at the Battle of Waterloo and displayed at the Royal Logistic Corps Museum

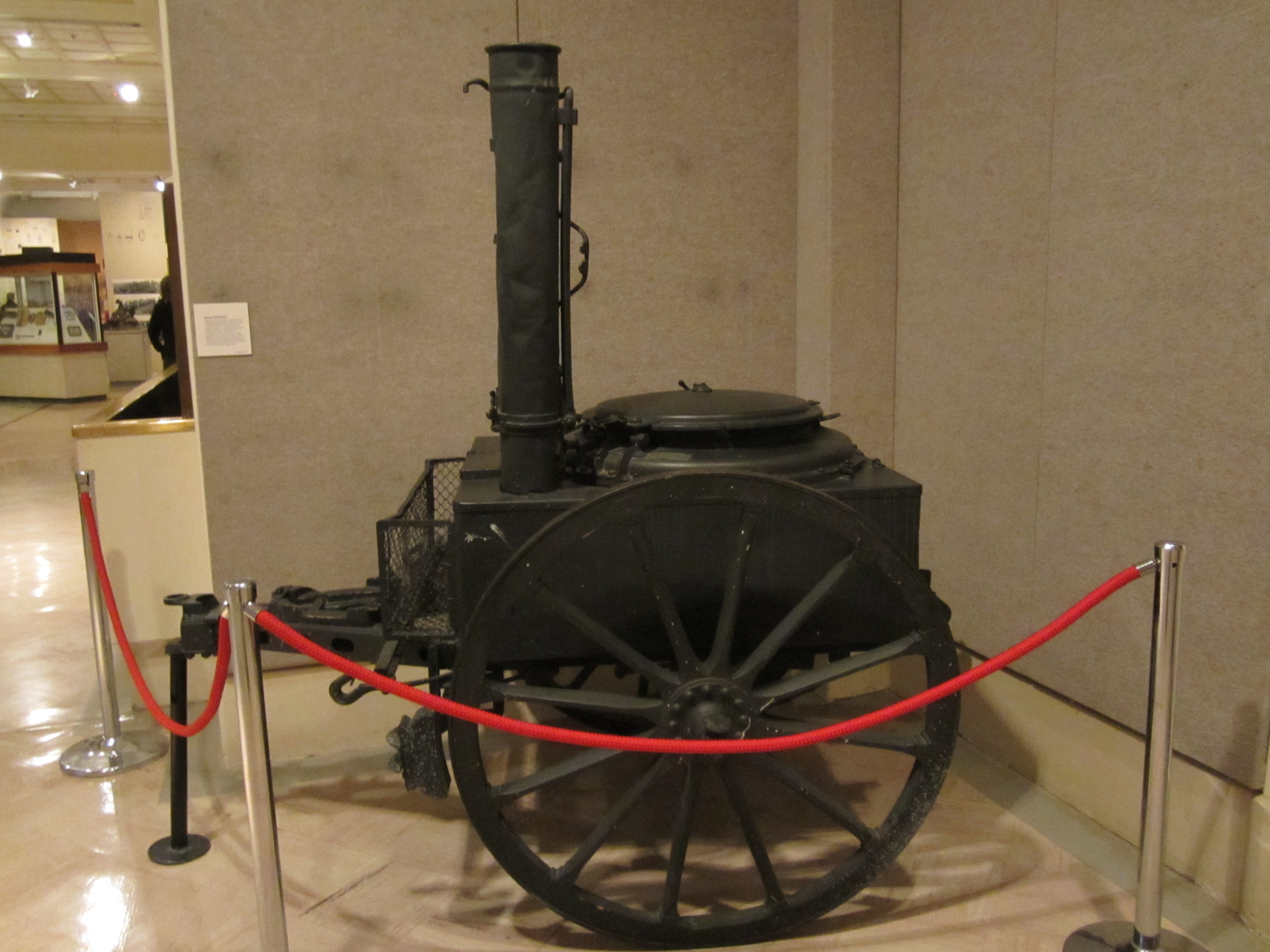
Imperial German Army trailer kitchen at the Australian War Memorial

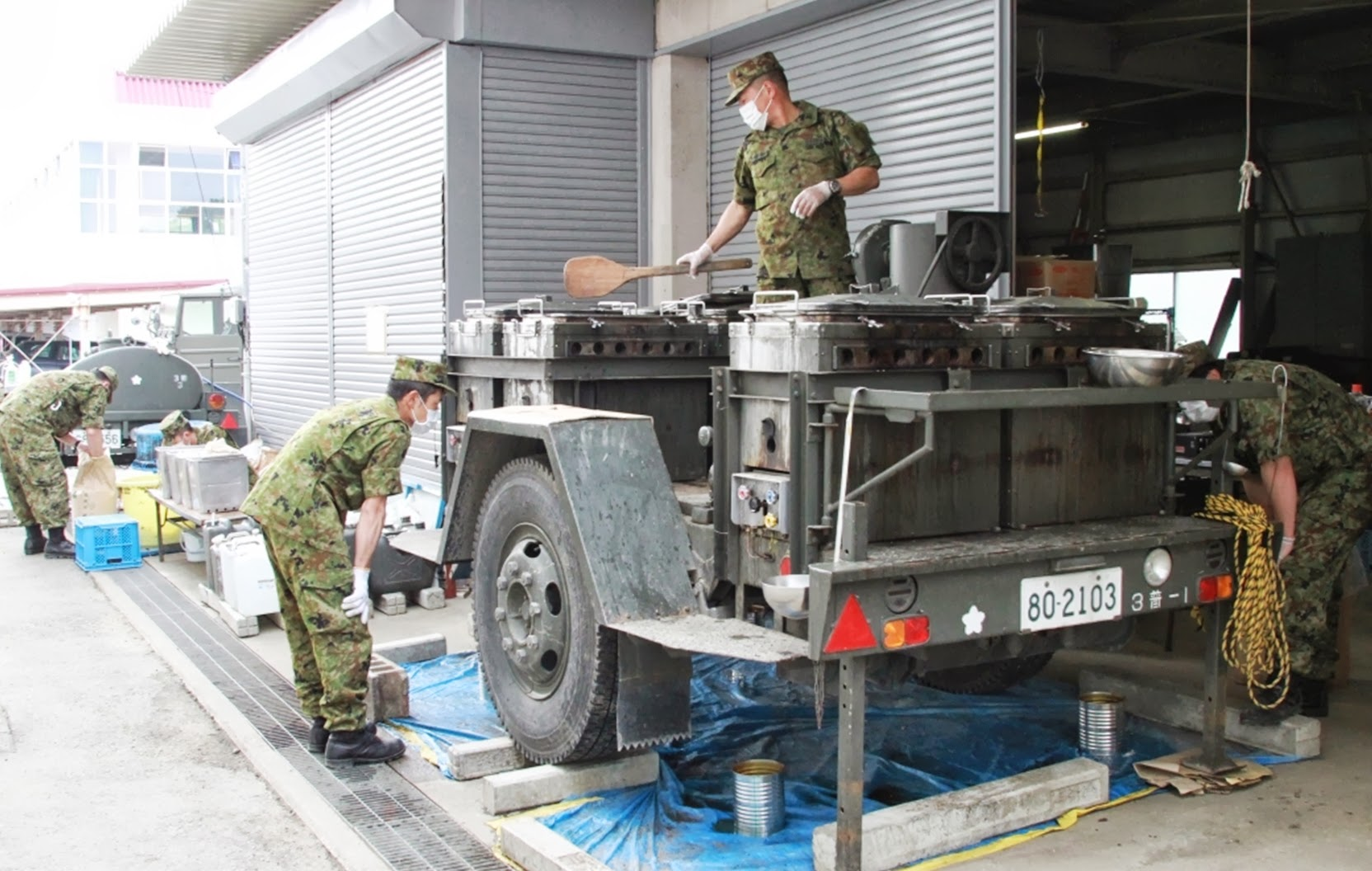
Japan Ground Self-Defense Force soldiers preparing meals on a yagai suigu trailer kitchen

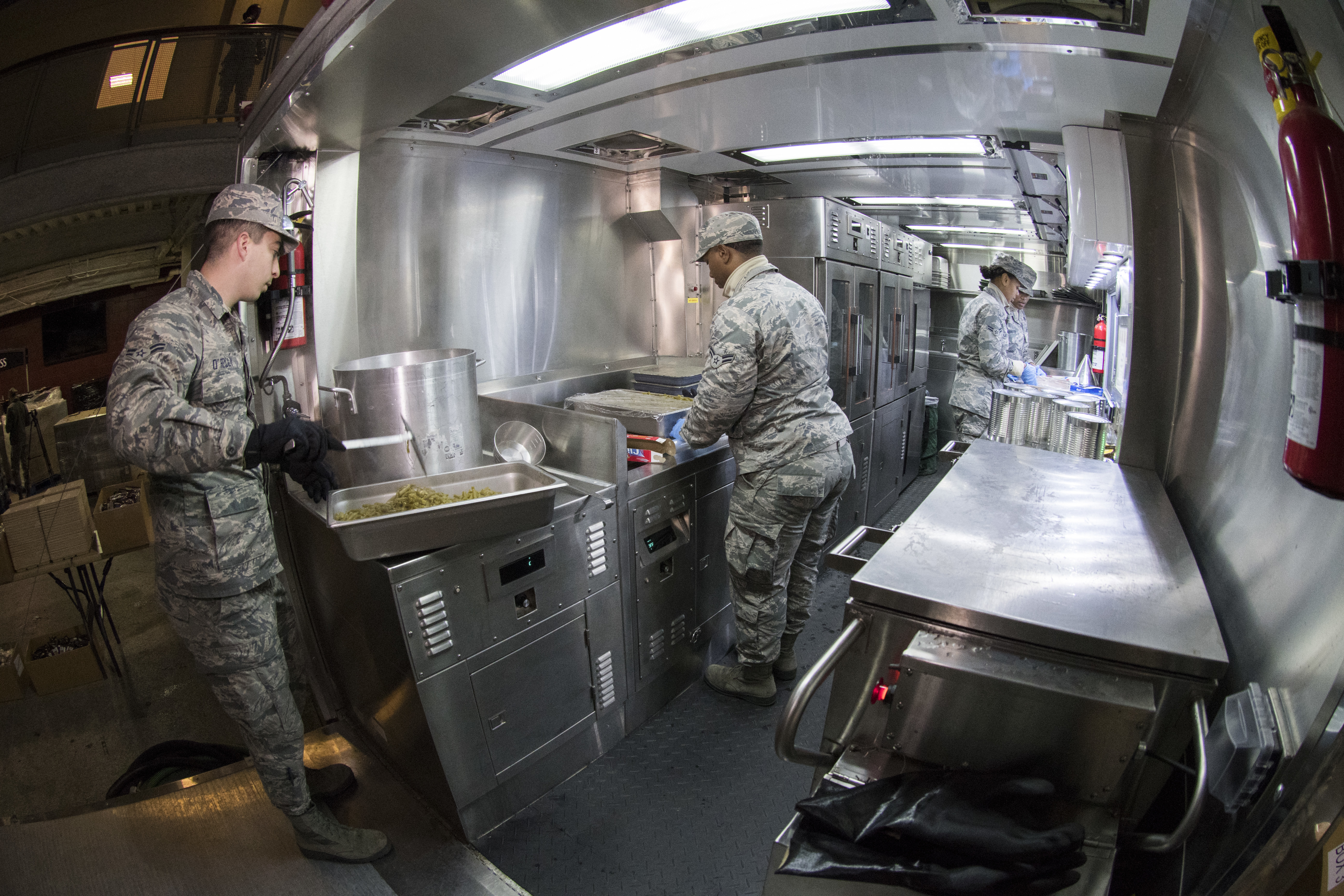
Georgia Air National Guard cooks preparing Unitized Group Rations in a trailer kitchen

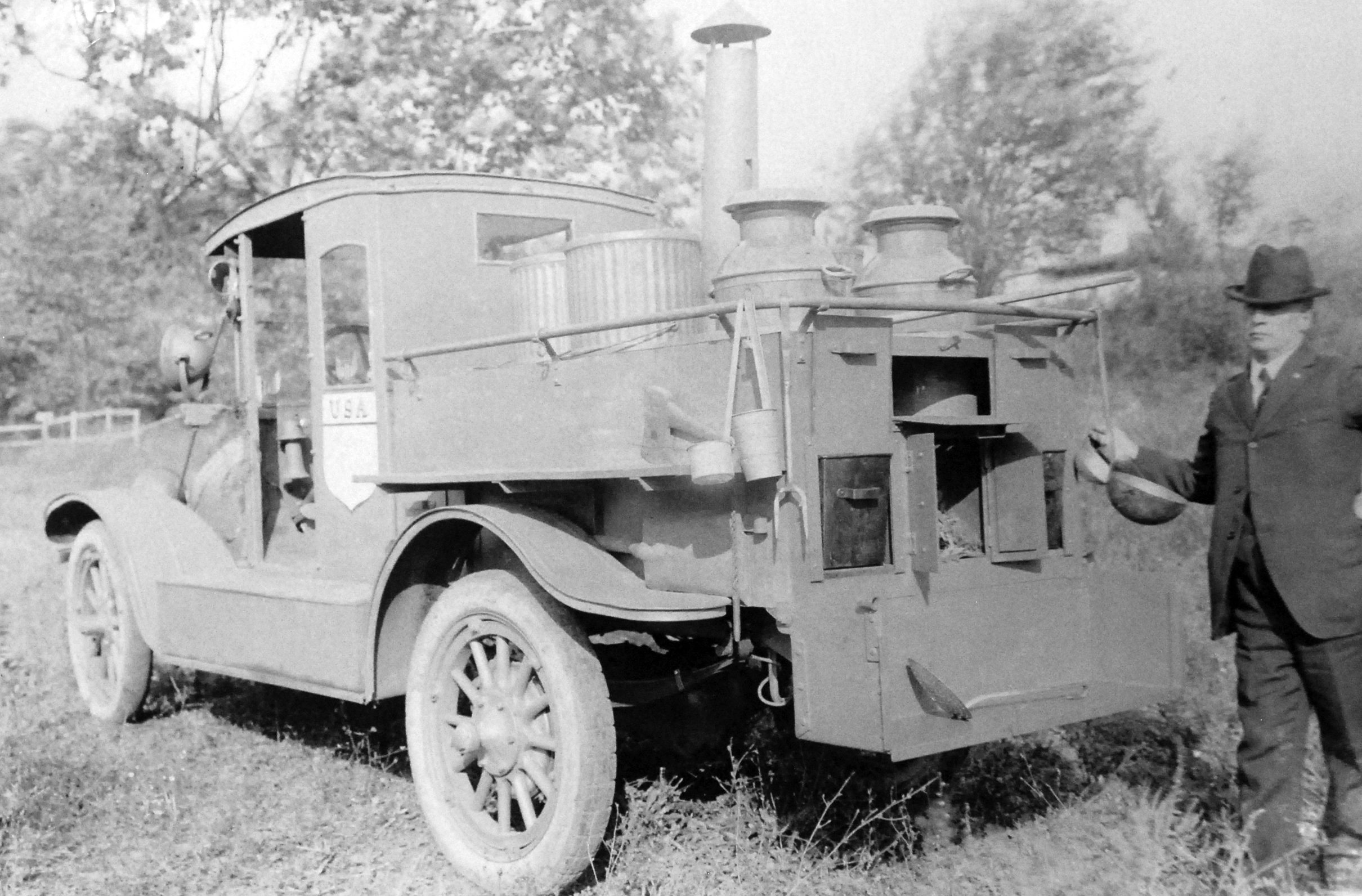
An early vehicle kitchen in the back of a truck, built for the American Expeditionary Forces during World War I

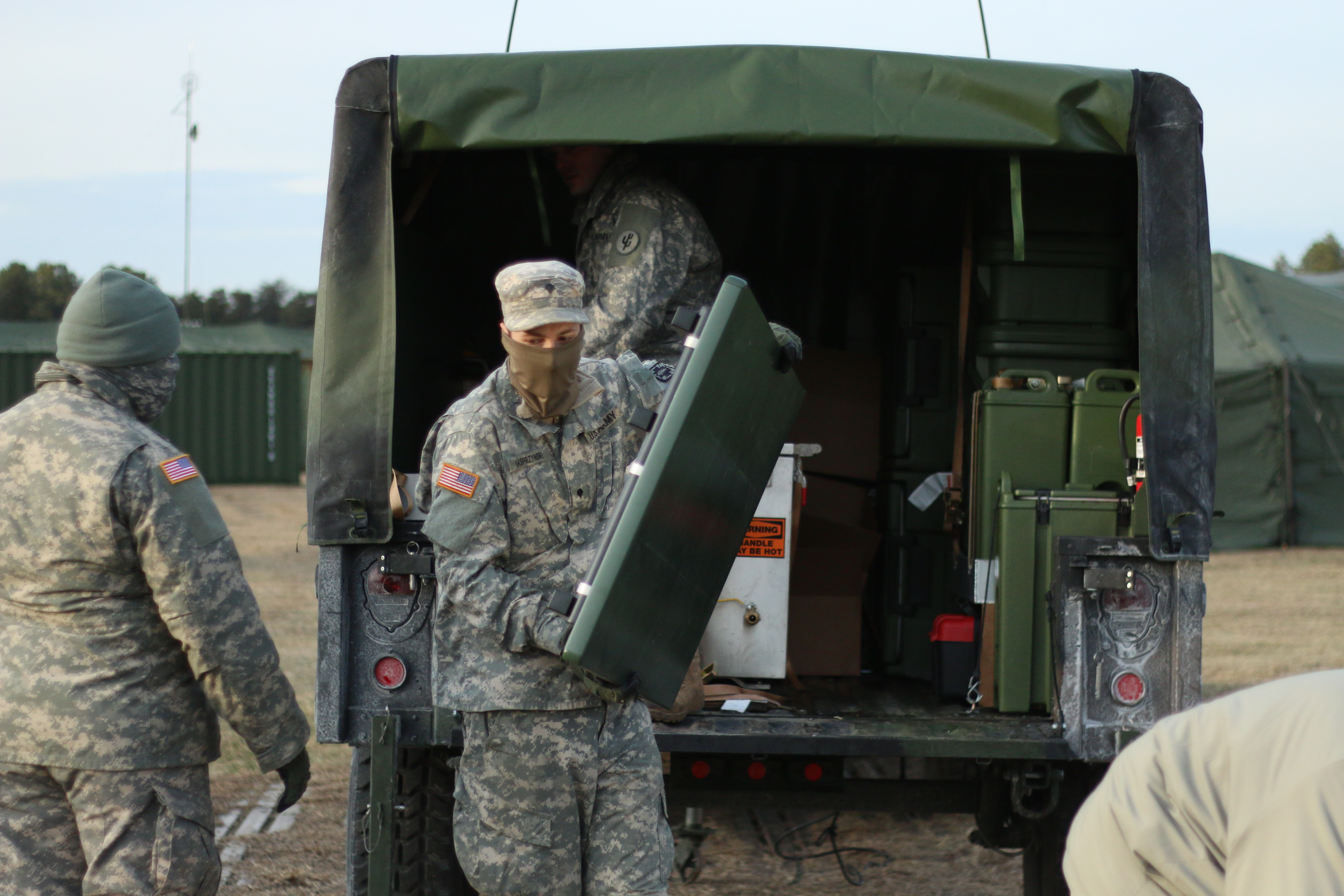
U.S. Army Reserve soldiers unpacking a Humvee-based assault kitchen

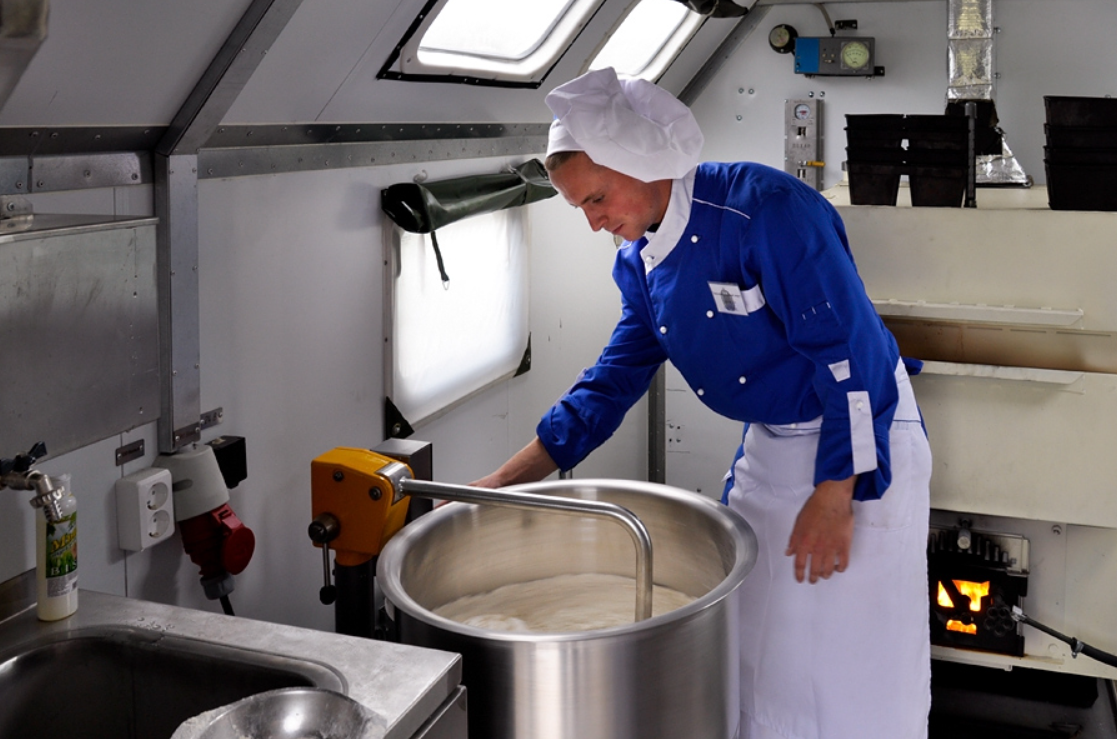
Bread dough being prepared in a Russian Armed Forces PAK-200M vehicle kitchen

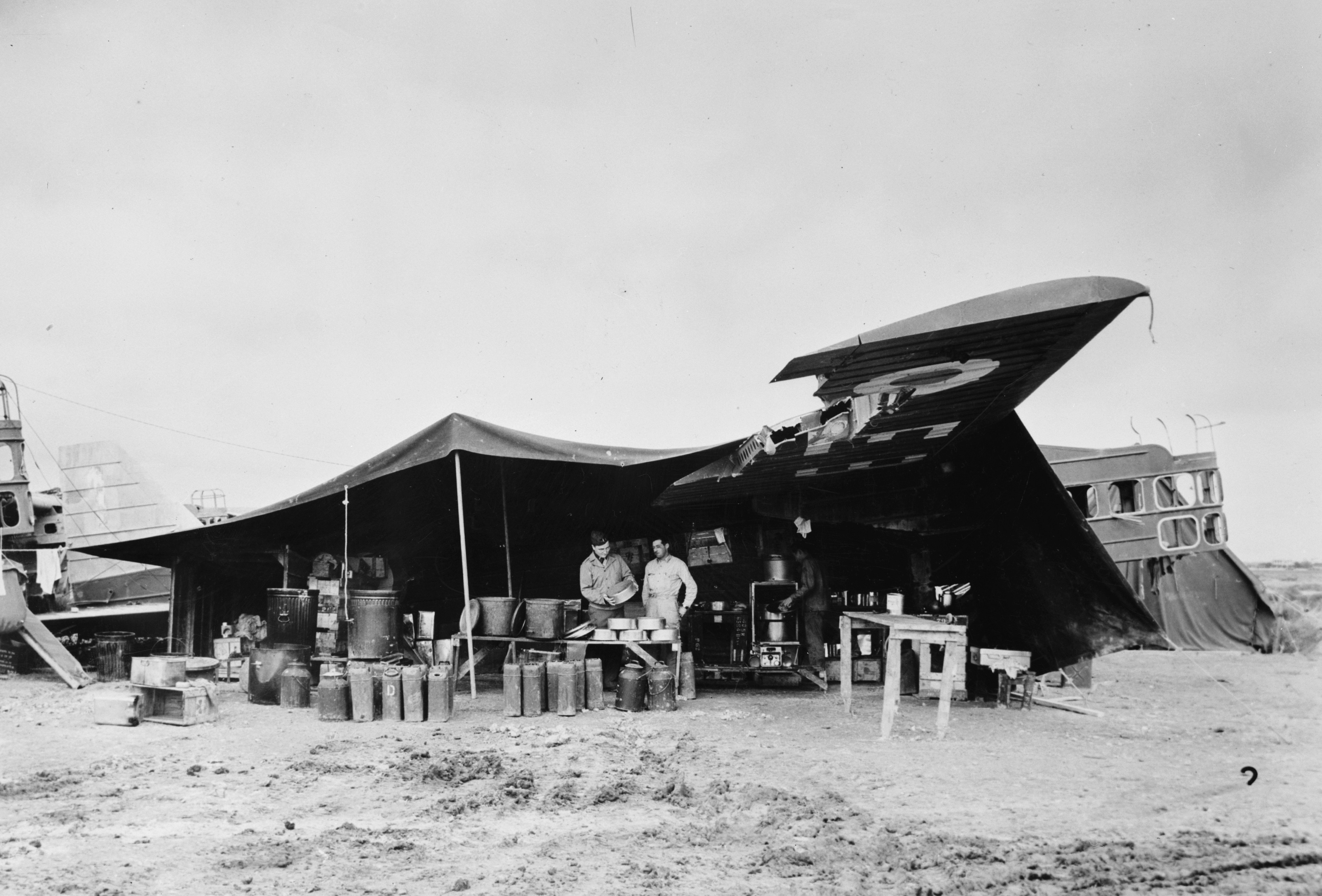
A camp kitchen set up by the U.S. Army under a derelict Bloch MB.200 during the North African campaign

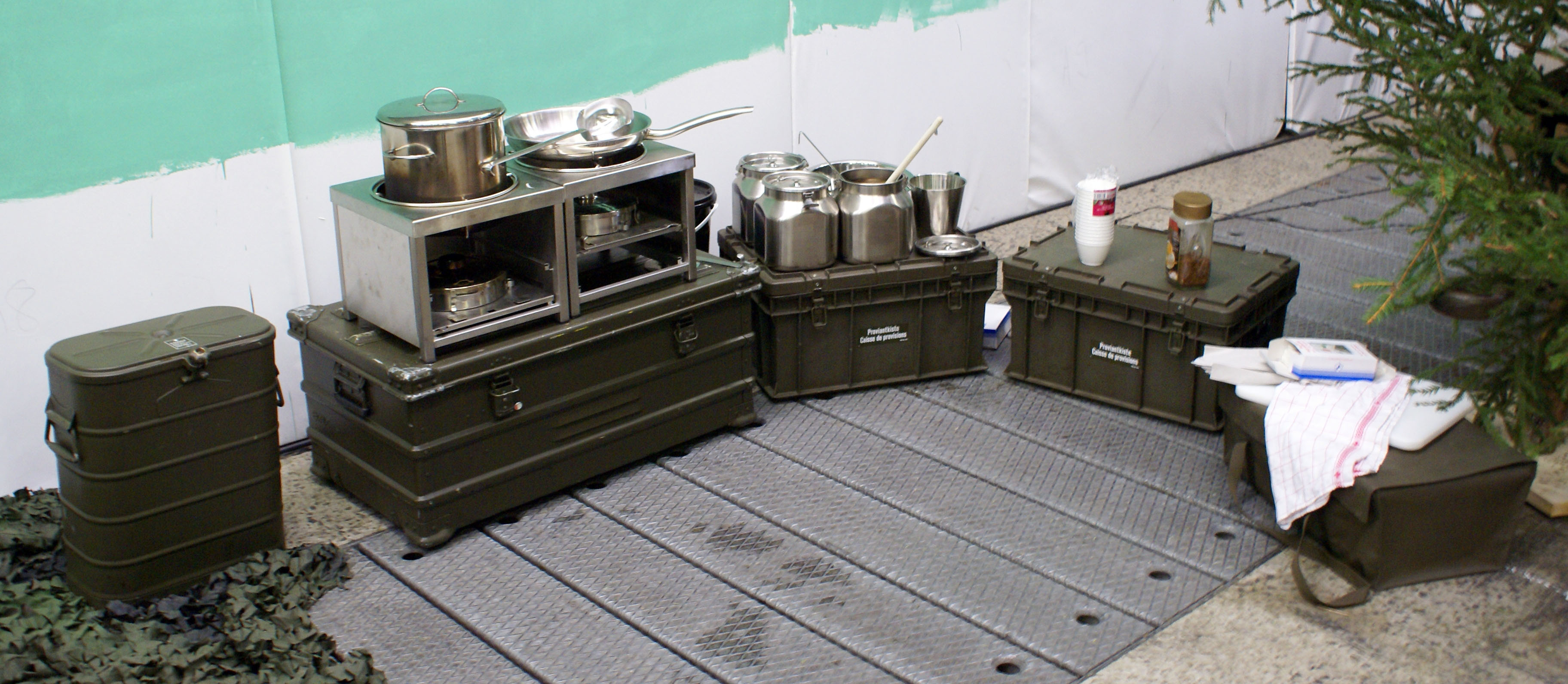
A Swiss Armed Forces deployable kitchen, designed to feed one squad

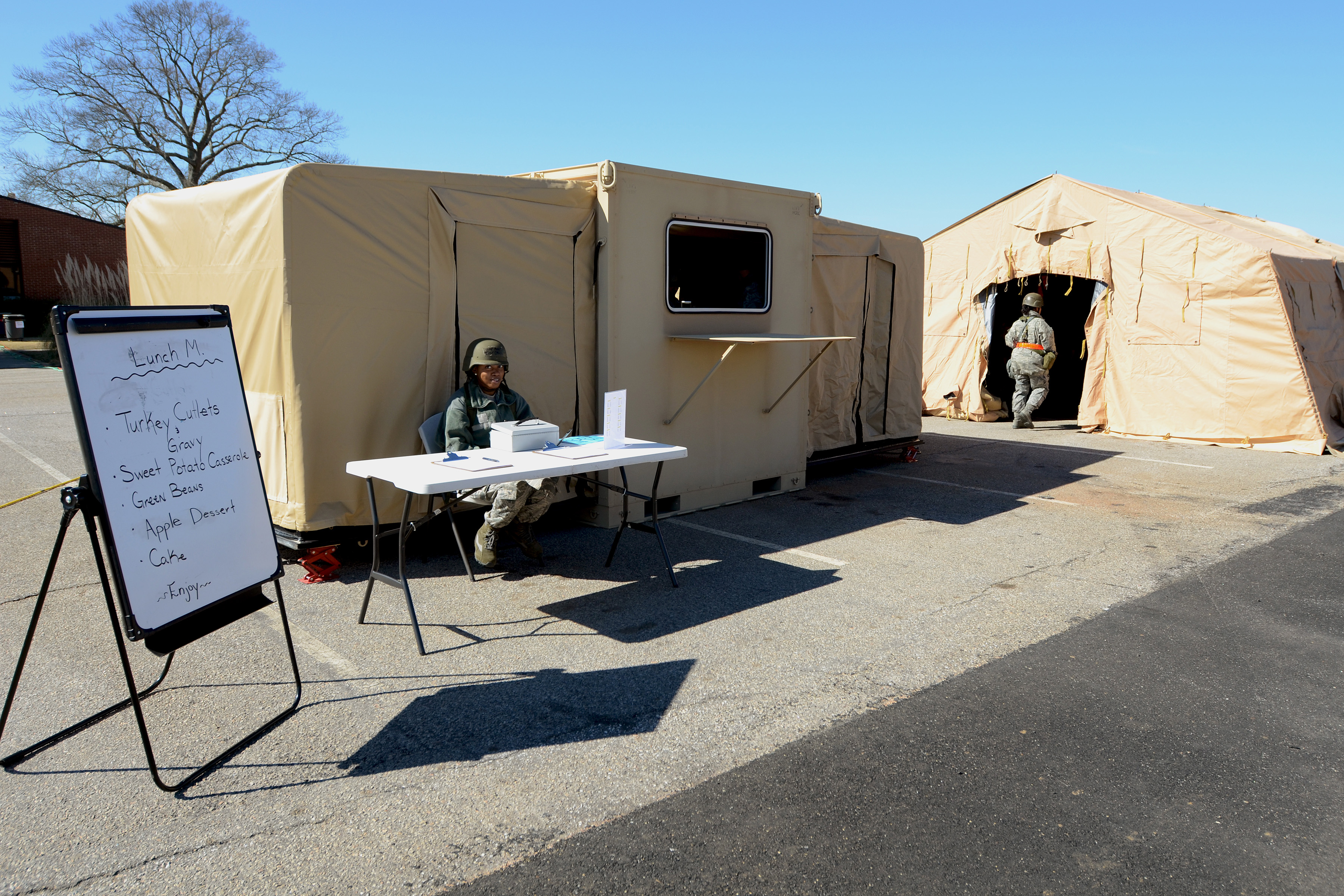
A single palletized expeditionary kitchen, an American containerized kitchen, used here by the U.S. Air Force

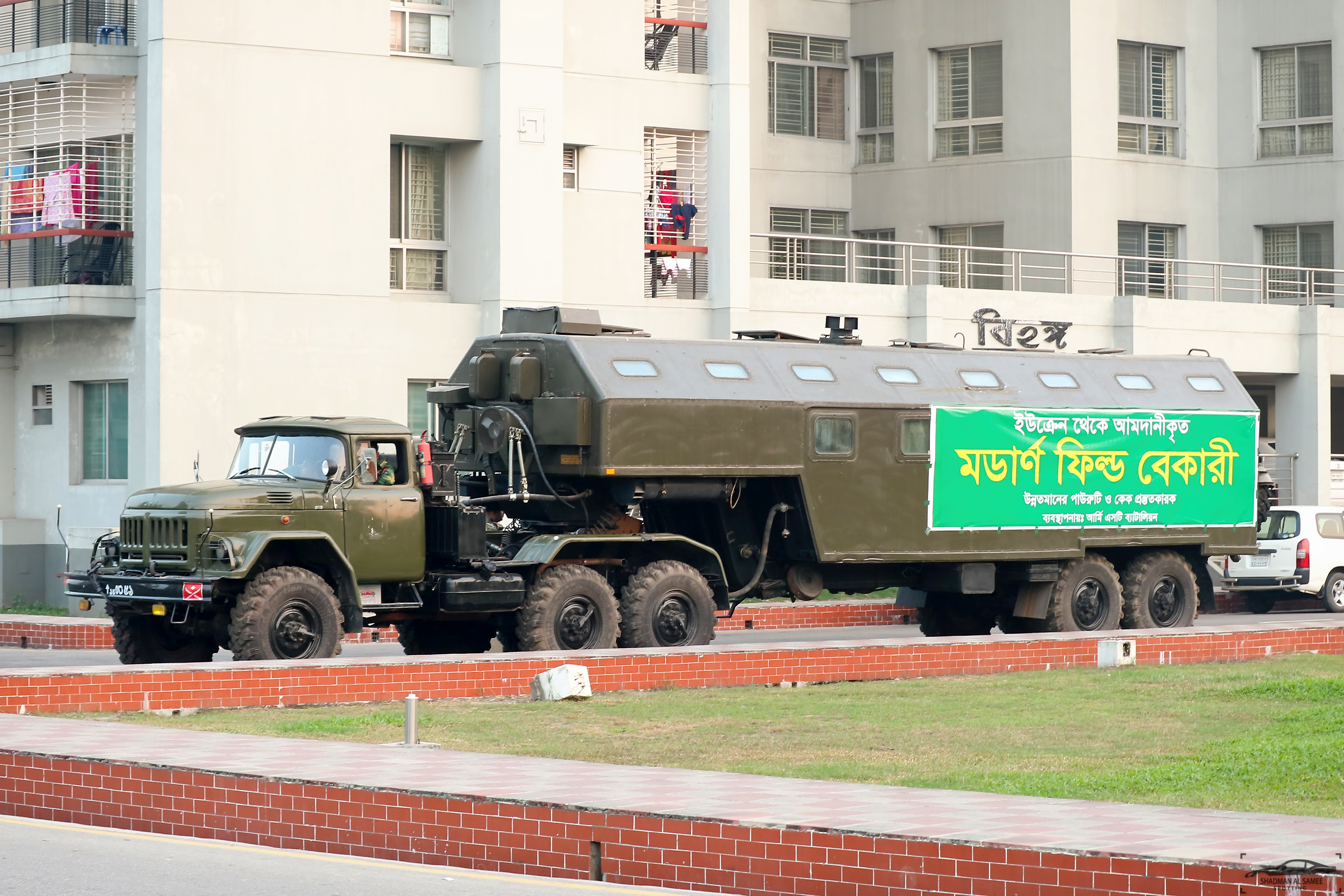
Bangladesh Army Mobile Field Bakery System

A World War II-era mobile canteen

== See also ==
- Garrison ration
- Field ration
- Mess
- Mess kit
- Canteen (bottle)
