= Unitized Group Ration =

U.S. military group ration

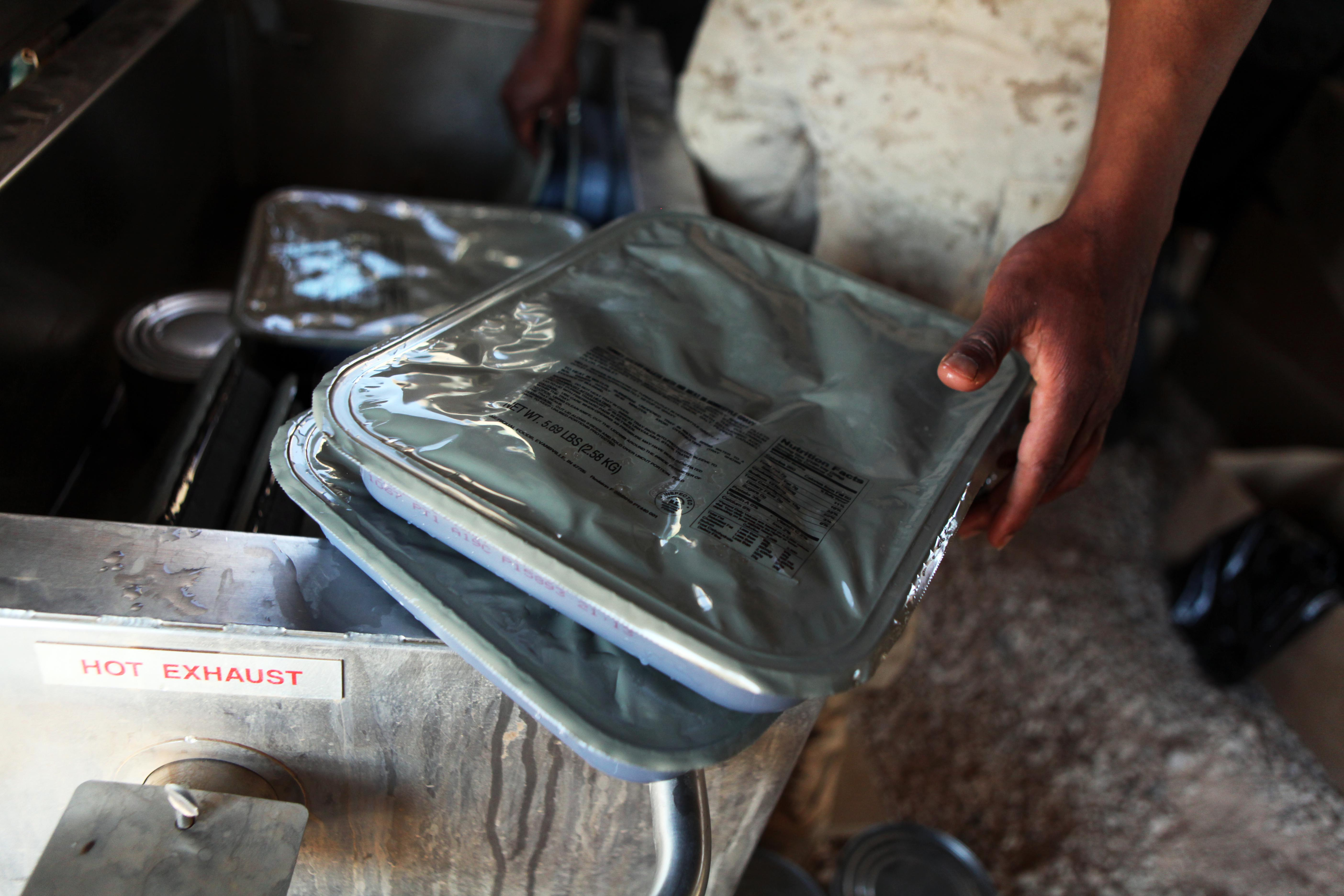
A Marine holding two UGR-H&S rations

The Unitized Group Ration (UGR) is a United States military ration used by the United States Armed Forces and Department of Defense (DoD). It is intended to sustain groups of American service members with access to a field kitchen, (Note: For all types except the Express, which is specifically designed to not require a kitchen.) serving as a field ration and a garrison ration. It is the modern successor to several older alphabetized rations— the A-ration, B-ration, and T-ration—combining them under a single unified system. UGRs are designed to meet the Military Daily Recommended Allowance when averaged over a 5 to 10 day period, with each meal providing between 1,300 and 1,450 kcal.

The UGR was introduced in 1999, and is currently known to be used by the U.S. Army, U.S. Marine Corps, U.S. Air Force, and National Guard. The U.S. Navy also reportedly uses the UGR for disembarked operations, using the Navy Standard Core Menu (NSCM) aboard naval vessels.

The UGR's individual field and combat equivalent is the better-known Meal, Ready-to-Eat (MRE), with the First Strike Ration (FSR), Long Range Patrol (LRP), and Meal, Cold Weather (MCW) serving as specialized field equivalents.

== History ==
Prior to the UGR's implementation, the U.S. military had several different types of rations used to feed service members in the rear or out of combat. Among them were the A-ration, consisting of fresh, refrigerated, or frozen food prepared in a kitchen and served in a mess, dining facility, or elsewhere; the B-ration, consisting of packaged, preserved foods prepared in a field kitchen; and the T-ration, a semi-perishable meal packaged, heated, and served in a tray pack similar to frozen meals; among others.

This created issues for military cooks, who "had to order an average of 34 separate items for each meal, and could only hope that they arrived when needed", forcing them to manage logistics and administrative functions instead of solely food preparation. Around 1995, the U.S. military launched a modernization program to resolve this issue while also increasing the quality and decreasing the cost of existing rations. Research was headed by the U.S. Army Natick Soldier Research, Development and Engineering Center and the U.S. Army Quartermaster Center and School. In 1999, the UGR was created to simplify logistics and ensure all necessary ingredients were provided, combining elements and offerings of the A-ration, B-ration, T-ration, and commercial items.

The UGR was initially trialed with the Army, with their first shipments received around 2000; the Air Force, Marine Corps, and Navy also began receiving UGRs at unspecified dates. The UGR-E was introduced in 2006. The UGR-B was phased out and replaced by the mostly similar UGR-M at an unspecified date.

== Types ==
As of 2023, four types of Unitized Group Rations exist.

=== Heat & Serve ===
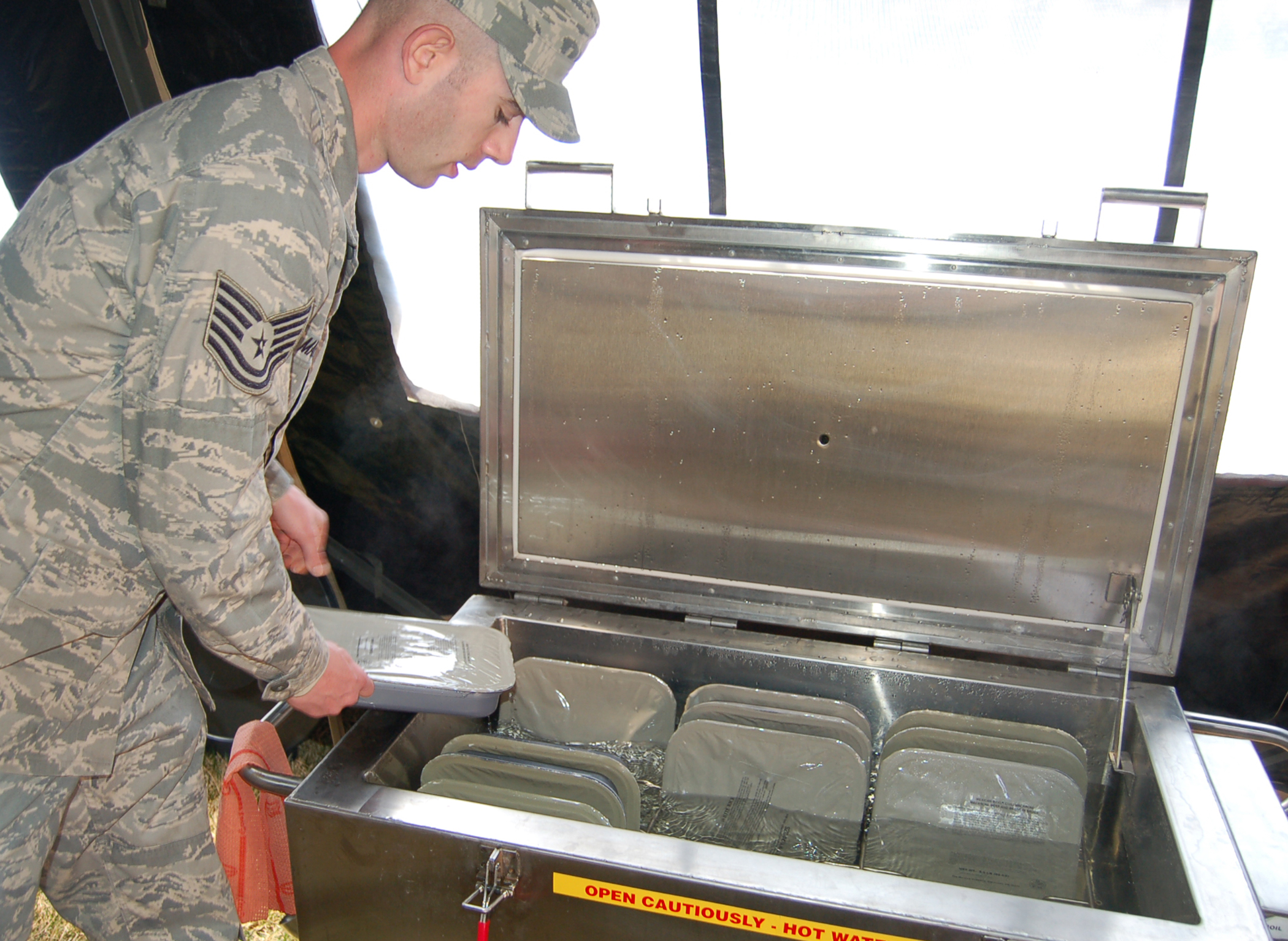
An Air Force airman placing UGR-H&S rations in an immersion heater

The Unitized Group Ration – Heat & Serve (UGR-H&S) is the successor to the T-ration, and consists of precooked, shelf-stable tray pack entrées. The UGR-H&S is hermetically sealed and can be prepared using a tray ration heater or by immersing it in boiling water, ready to serve in 30 to 45 minutes. The UGR-H&S has 5 breakfast menus and 10 lunch/dinner menus. Each meal provides an average of 1,450 kcal. Each UGR-H&S module contains 50 meals, with each pallet holding 400 meals. UGR-H&S modules have a minimum shelf life of 18 months at 80 °F (26.6 °C).

=== A Option ===
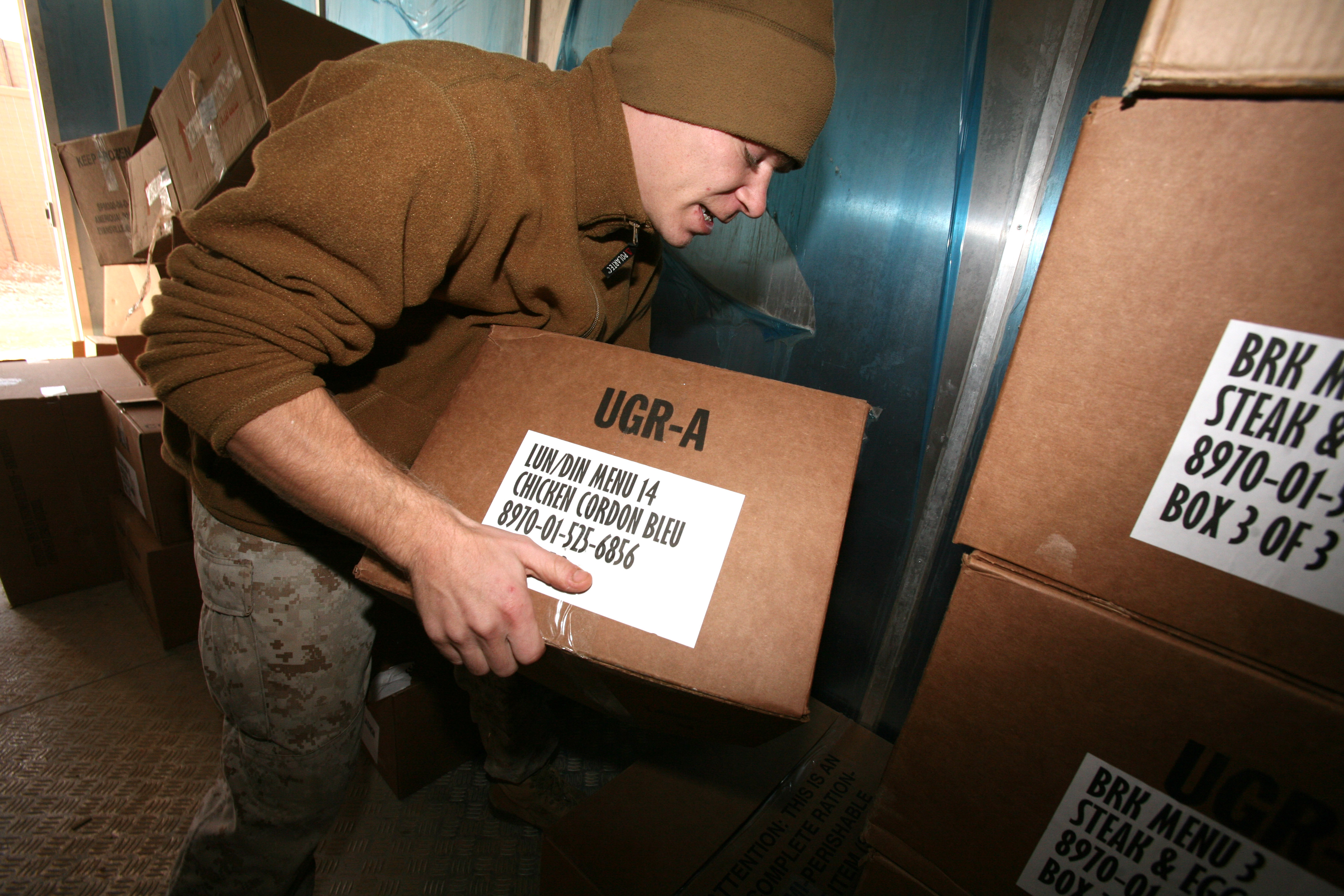
A Marine looking through UGR-A boxes in a freezer

The Unitized Group Ration – A (UGR-A) is the successor to the A-ration, and consists of perishable entrées intended to be prepared in a field kitchen. The UGR-A is the only UGR with frozen food, and requires refrigeration to store and prepare. The UGR-A has 7 breakfast menus and 14 lunch/dinner menus. Each meal provides an average of 1,450 kcal. Each UGR-A module contains 50 meals, with each pallet holding 600 meals. UGR-A modules have a minimum shelf life of 9 months outside the contiguous U.S. and 3 months within the contiguous U.S., at 80 °F (26.6 °C) for semi-perishable modules and 0 °F (-17.7 °C) for perishable modules.

==== A, Short Order ====
The Unitized Group Ration – A, Short Order (UGR-A SO) consists of meals intended to supplement the UGR-A and expand available food options or feed larger groups, especially where alternate dining facilities or existing meal options are unavailable. Most UGR-A SO meals are based on fast food, pub food, and finger food. The UGR-A SO has the same kilocalorie amount, storage, and minimum shelf life as the regular UGR-A.

=== M Option ===
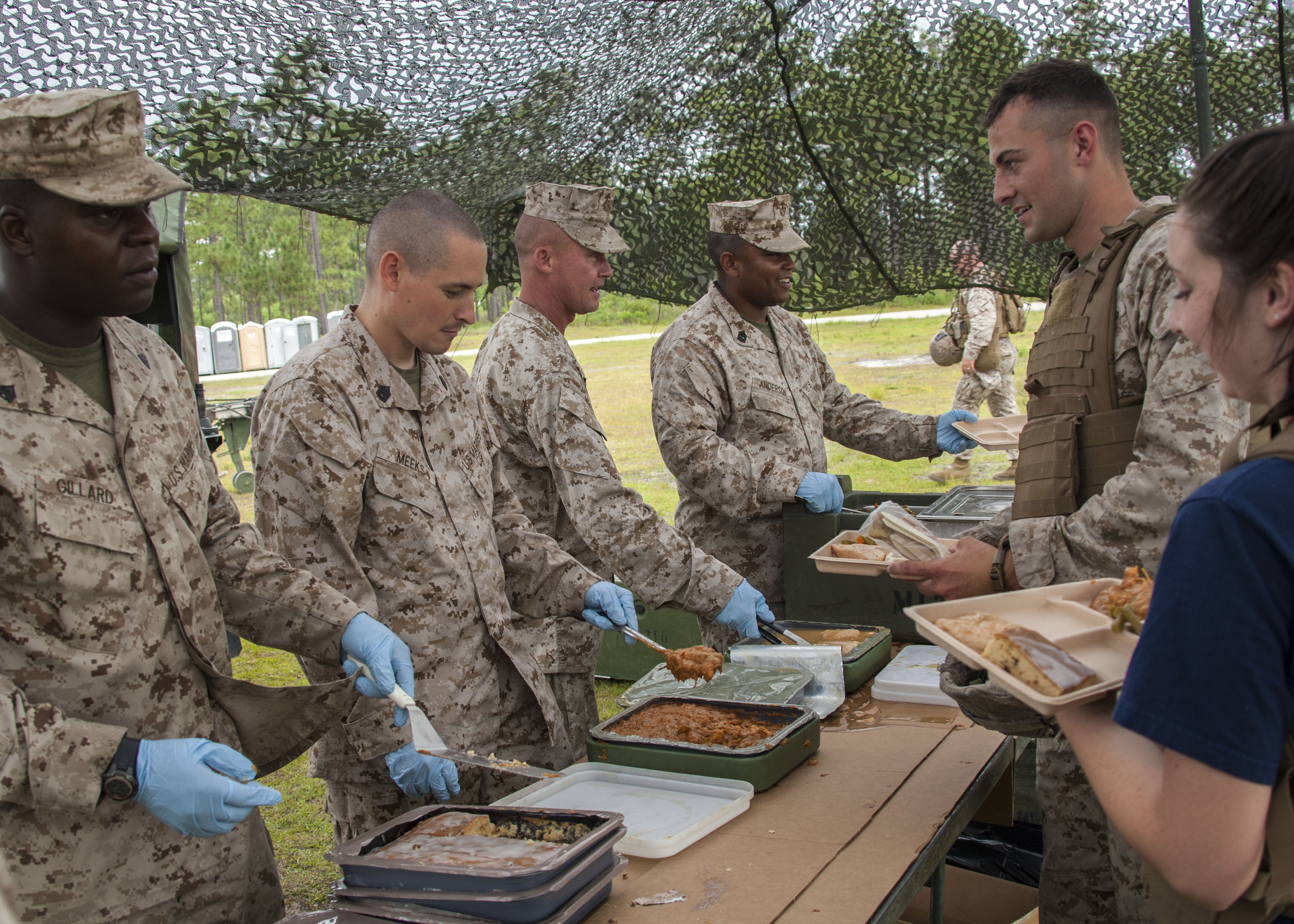
Marines serving UGR-Ms during a family career awareness event

The Unitized Group Ration – M (UGR-M), formerly the Unitized Group Ration – B (UGR-B), is the successor to the B-ration, and consists of packaged and dehydrated unprepared food intended to be assembled and prepared in a field kitchen. Designed to suit the needs of the U.S. Marine Corps, each UGR-M comes with ingredients that are primarily tailored toward specific recipes but could potentially be used to prepare other dishes. The UGR-M has 7 breakfast menus and 14 lunch/dinner menus. Each meal provides an average of 1,300 kcal. Each UGR-M module contains 50 meals, with each pallet holding 400 meals. UGR-M modules have a minimum shelf life of 18 months at 80 °F (26.6 °C).

=== Express ===
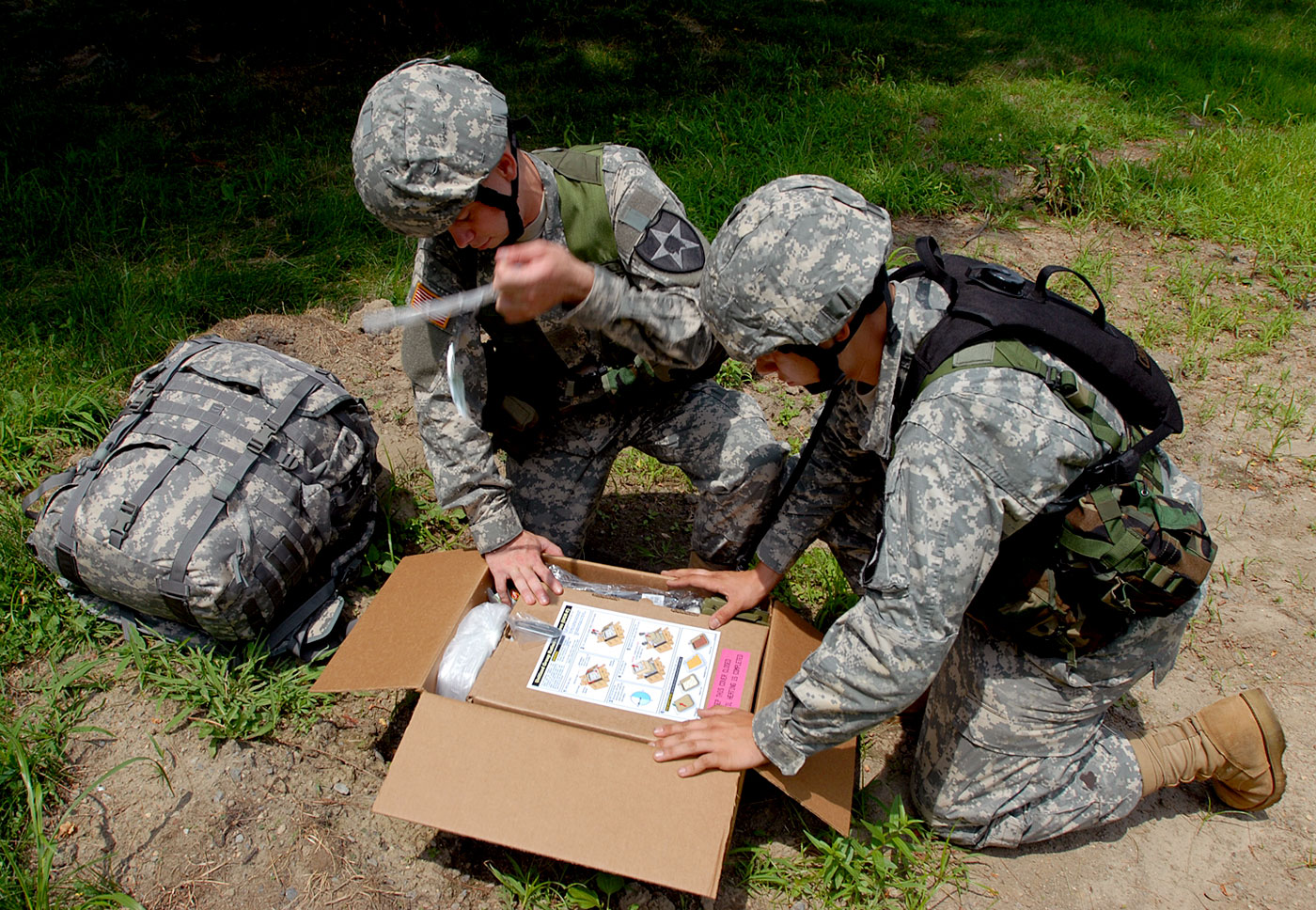
Army soldiers activating the heating unit of a UGR-E

The Unitized Group Ration – Express (UGR-E or UGR-Express), nicknamed the "kitchen in a carton", consists of meals in self-heating steam table trays based on the UGR-H&S meal offerings. The UGR-E is designed to provide hot meals where feeding a group with hot food would otherwise be unfeasible. Unlike other UGRs, it uses a flameless ration heater and does not require a separate field kitchen. The UGR-E begins heating with the pull of a tab, and can fully heat a meal within 30 to 45 minutes. The UGR-E has 4 breakfast menus, 8 lunch/dinner menus, and 1 holiday menu. Each meal provides an average of 1,300 kcal. Each UGR-E module contains 18 meals, with each pallet holding 400 meals. UGR-E modules have a minimum shelf life of 18 months at 80 °F (26.6 °C).

== Menus ==
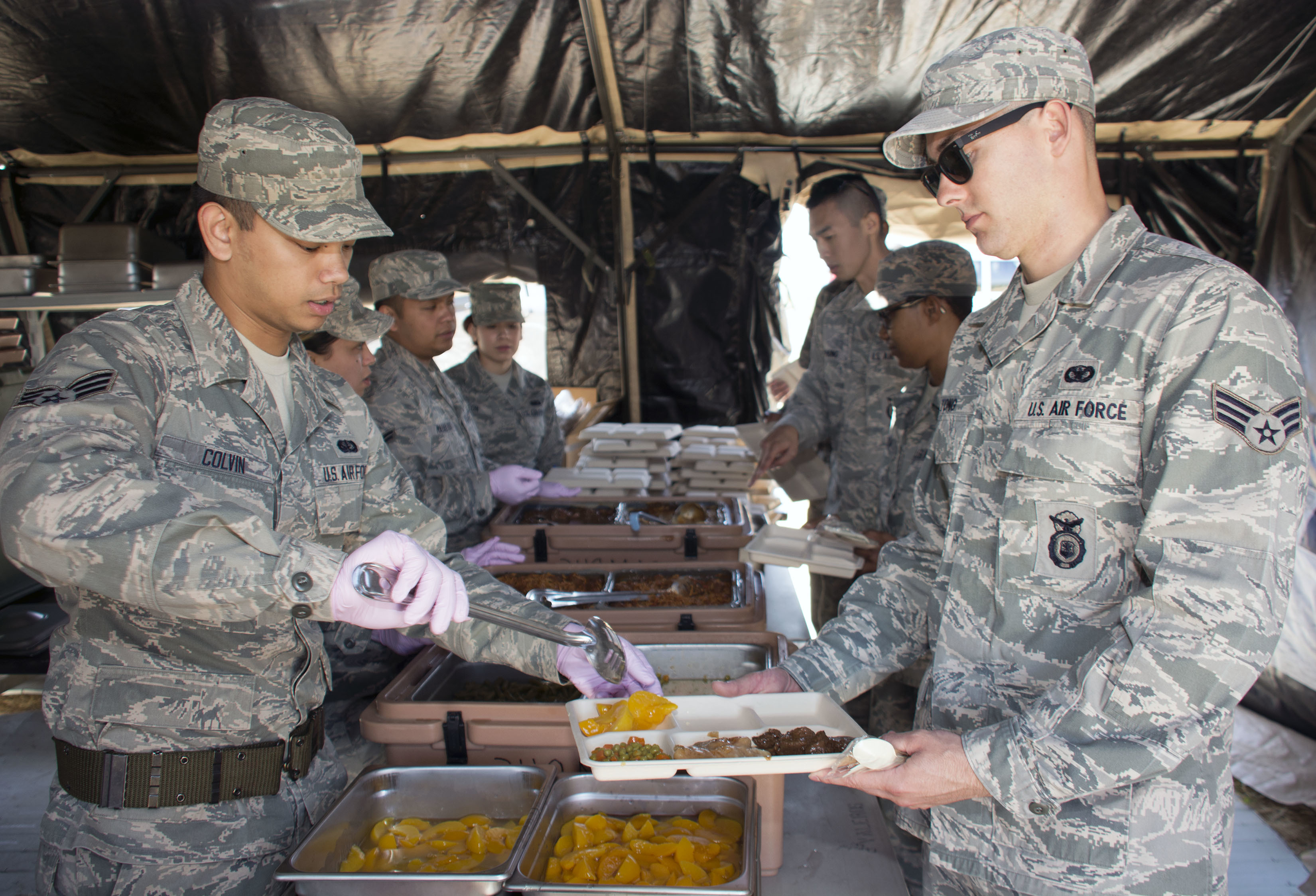
Air Force airmen serving UGR meals in an expeditionary kitchen

The UGR comes in two menu variations: breakfast and lunch/dinner. Menus are intended to be cycled through regularly. They include both standard American cuisine and diverse cuisines. The UGR-E also has a unique holiday menu variant.

UGR modules come with mandatory and optional meal supplements—namely UHT milk, cereal, bread, fruits, vegetables, salads, drink mixes, and condiments—as well as eating utensils, kitchen utensils, disposable mess trays, cups, napkins, and trash bags.

=== Menu options ===
The menus below are adapted from lists available on the website of the Defense Logistics Agency (DLA). UGR menus are regularly modified to improve their variety, nutrition, and efficiency. As the DLA does not regularly publish UGR menus. The lists below use the 2020 menu for the UGR-H&S, 2023 menu for the UGR-A, 2014 menu for the UGR-M, and 2021 menu for the UGR-E.

Note that the lists below do not include milk, bread, fruit, or salad supplements, or items standard to most UGRs such as regular coffee and hot sauce.

UGR-H&S menus
Menu and number	Meals	Desserts	Condiments and beverages
Breakfast 1	Egg mix, pork sausage links in brine, beef and potatoes in cream gravy	Apple spice breakfast cake, apple dessert	Salsa or Picante sauce, grape jelly, grape juice
Breakfast 2	Egg mix, turkey sausage patties in brine, corned beef hash	Apple cinnamon oatmeal, blueberry pastry	Ketchup, strawberry jelly, orange juice
Breakfast 3	Egg mix, beef and potatoes in cream gravy, bacon	Breakfast cake with maple syrup, blueberry dessert	Ketchup, grape jelly, grape juice
Breakfast 4	Turkey sausage skillet, corned beef hash	Golden harvest cake with icing, frosted chocolate chip pastry	Ketchup, strawberry jelly, orange juice
Breakfast 5	Egg mix, turkey sausage patties in brine, beef fajita filling, tortillas	Apple cinnamon oatmeal, carrot cake with icing	Salsa or Picante sauce, grape jelly, grape juice
Lunch/Dinner 1	Chicken chili, white rice, corn	Fruit cocktail, carrot cake with icing	
Lunch/Dinner 2	Spaghetti and meatballs, green beans	Pan-coated chocolate disks, white chocolate chip cookies with cranberries, pears	
Lunch/Dinner 3	Burgundy beef stew, brown rice and wild rice pilaf, peas and carrots	Peanut butter cookies with chocolate chips, peaches	
Lunch/Dinner 4	Buffalo chicken strips in sauce, pulled pork, tortillas, brown rice, green beans	Red velvet cake with icing	
Lunch/Dinner 5	Chicken breast with gravy, brown rice and wild rice pilaf, mixed vegetables	White chocolate chip cookies with cranberries, peaches, jalapeño cashews	Cranberry sauce
Lunch/Dinner 6	Beef fajita filling, tortillas, white rice, peas and carrots	Yellow cake with icing	Salsa or Picante sauce, jalapeño cheese spread
Lunch/Dinner 7	Turkey cutlets in gravy, sweet potato casserole, mashed potatoes with gravy, green beans	Apple dessert, blueberry pastry	Cranberry sauce
Lunch/Dinner 8	Chili, white rice, carrots	Pan-coated chocolate disks, peanut butter cookies with chocolate chips, pears	
Lunch/Dinner 9	Chicken strips in broth, mashed potatoes with gravy, corn, teriyaki meat stick	Chocolate cherry cake with cherry toppings, pears	Barbecue sauce
Lunch/Dinner 10	Cajun-style diced chicken breast with andouille chicken sausage in sauce, brown rice, mixed vegetables	Pan-coated peanut butter disks, white chocolate chip cookies with cranberries, fruit cocktail	

UGR-A and UGR-A, Short Order menus
Menu and number	Meals	Desserts	Condiments and beverages
Breakfast 1	Turkey bacon, chicken burrito	Date walnut breakfast cake, toaster pastry, oatmeal	Orange juice
Breakfast 2	Cheese omelet, vegetable sausage patties, bacon	French toast apple bake, peanut butter chocolate bar	Peanut butter, grape jelly, apple juice
Breakfast 3	Steak, French toast taquito	Mixed berry muffin	All-purpose sauce, fruit punch
Breakfast 4	Chicken sausage patty, breakfast bowl with turkey ham	Pancakes, cinnamon streusel muffin	Peanut butter, strawberry jam, pancake syrup, grape juice
Breakfast 5	Vegan breakfast burrito, breakfast fried rice with turkey sausage	Lemon oat bar, granola bar	Orange juice
Breakfast 6	Chicken and waffle sandwich, beef sausage links	Doughnut stick, oatmeal	Peanut butter, grape jelly, apple juice
Breakfast 7	Chicken and biscuits, creamed ground beef	Cranberry orange loaf	Biscuit gravy, Worcestershire sauce, grape juice
Lunch/Dinner 1	Korean barbecue chicken thighs, brown rice, green beans	Raspberry cheesecake bites, peanut butter chocolate bar	All-purpose sauce, tea, energy drink
Lunch/Dinner 2	Bulgogi, Thai sweet chili chicken, basmati rice, carrots	Espresso brownie with salted caramel frosting, strawberry breakfast bar	Cold brew coffee, drink mixes, pink lemonade
Lunch/Dinner 3	Shrimp and grits, vegetarian chili, brown rice, carrots and peas	Strawberry shortcake, granola bar	Peanut butter, grape jelly, tea, peach mango drink
Lunch/Dinner 4	Turkey with gravy, stuffing, mashed potatoes, sweet potatoes, green beans	Apple pie log	Cranberry sauce, energy drink, watermelon drink
Lunch/Dinner 5	Beef and broccoli, spring rolls, basmati rice, carrots	Chocolate chantilly cake	Sriracha, cold brew coffee, drink mixes, energy drink
Lunch/Dinner 6	Chicken balls with tomato sauce, macaroni, peas and carrots	Salted caramel mini Bundt cake, granola bar, applesauce	Tea, peach iced tea
Lunch/Dinner 7	Grilled steak, mashed potatoes, corn	Chocolate cola cake, granola bar	Peanut butter, strawberry jelly, gravy, all-purpose sauce, drink mixes, energy drink
Lunch/Dinner 8	Barbecue pork ribs, fried chicken, collard greens, macaroni and cheese	Veggie cornbread, chocolate and vanilla cupcakes	Gravy, barbecue sauce, tea, iced tea
Lunch/Dinner 9	Jambalaya, Creole pasta with shrimp and catfish, green beans	Ranger cookie, granola bar, applesauce	All-purpose sauce, drink mixes, watermelon drink
Lunch/Dinner 10	Chicken and vegetables in Monterey Jack cheese sauce, brown rice, peas and carrots	Pineapple mini Bundt cake, granola bar, peaches	Cold brew coffee, peach iced tea, energy drink
Lunch/Dinner 11	Salmon in mango chili sauce, cheese tortellini primavera, primavera rice, peas	Blueberry fruit tart, apple cinnamon breakfast bar	Peanut butter, grape jelly, all-purpose sauce, energy drink
Lunch/Dinner 12	Roast chicken quarters, quinoa rice blend, carrots	Carrot cake, granola bar, applesauce	All-purpose sauce, iced tea, drink mixes
Lunch/Dinner 13	Chicken cordon bleu, mashed potatoes, green beans	Red velvet mini Bundt cake, blueberry breakfast bar, peaches	Gravy, cold brew coffee, tea, peach mango drink
Lunch/Dinner 14	Beef short ribs, mashed potatoes, corn	Pecan praline cake	Peanut butter, strawberry jam, gravy, all-purpose sauce, barbecue sauce, tea, pink lemonade
Short Order 1	Philly cheesesteak, green beans	Granola bar	Energy drink
Short Order 2	Beef taco kit, brown rice, corn	Granola bar	Watermelon drink
Short Order 3	Chicken wings, corn	Strawberry breakfast bar	Barbecue sauce, pink lemonade
Short Order 4	Hamburger, hot dog, vegetarian chili, baked beans	Apple pie log	All-purpose sauce, peach mango drink
Short Order 5	Vegan chicken tenders, baked beans	Blueberry breakfast bar	Barbecue sauce, watermelon drink
Short Order 6	Breaded shrimp, macaroni primavera	Peanut butter chocolate bar	All-purpose sauce, pink lemonade

UGR-M menus
Menu and number	Meal components	Dessert components	Beverages
Breakfast 1	Bacon, cheddar cheese, tortillas	Yellow cake mix, apple pie filling, fruit cocktail	Orange juice
Breakfast 2	Turkey sausage links	Yellow cake mix, blueberry pie filling, pears	Apple juice
Breakfast 3	Creamed ground beef, bacon, biscuit mix	Peaches	Orange juice
Breakfast 4	Creamed turkey sausage, biscuit mix	Yellow cake mix, cherry pie filling, fruit cocktail	Grape juice
Breakfast 5	Ham, bacon, onions, green bell peppers, biscuit mix, biscuit gravy	Pears	Orange juice
Breakfast 6	Creamed turkey sausage, ham, rice, mixed vegetables, onions, soy sauce, fried rice seasoning	Yellow cake mix, apple pie filling, fruit cocktail	Apple juice
Breakfast 7	Turkey sausage links, cheddar cheese, tortillas	Yellow cake mix, blueberry pie filling, pears	Orange juice
Lunch/Dinner 1	Beef, mashed potatoes, peas and carrots, biscuit mix, gravy	Sugar cookie mix, cinnamon, fruit cocktail	
Lunch/Dinner 2	Chicken, rice, corn, cornbread mix, Creole sauce	Oatmeal cookie mix, fruit cocktail	
Lunch/Dinner 3	Pork chops, potatoes au gratin, green beans, jalapeño peppers, cornbread mix, bourbon-flavored barbecue sauce	Brownie mix, pan-coated peanut butter disks, applesauce	
Lunch/Dinner 4	Chicken, rice, mixed vegetables, carrots, biscuit mix, gravy	Yellow cake mix, chocolate icing, pears	
Lunch/Dinner 5	Chicken, linguini, black beans, corn, jalapeño peppers, Alfredo sauce, salsa, Southwest seasoning	Yellow cake mix, blueberry pie filling, cinnamon, brown sugar, chocolate pudding, peaches	
Lunch/Dinner 6	Beef, linguini, mushrooms, onions, green beans, biscuit mix, sour cream	Brownie mix, pears	
Lunch/Dinner 7	Chicken, shrimp, rice, tomatoes, peas, biscuit mix, salsa	Yellow cake mix, apple pie filling, cinnamon, brown sugar, vanilla pudding	
Lunch/Dinner 8	Chicken, macaroni, American cheese, black beans, corn, carrots, jalapeño peppers, cornbread mix, salsa	Oatmeal cookie mix, pan-coated chocolate disks, pears	
Lunch/Dinner 9	Chicken, brown rice, mixed vegetables, biscuit mix, gravy	Oatmeal cookie mix, apple pie filling, vanilla pudding, peaches	
Lunch/Dinner 10	Spaghetti, meatballs in sauce, cheddar cheese, green beans, biscuit mix, tomato paste, Italian seasoning	Spice cake mix, icing, chocolate pudding, fruit cocktail	
Lunch/Dinner 11	Chicken, stuffing, mashed potatoes, carrots, gravy	Oatmeal cookie mix, pears, nuts and raisins	
Lunch/Dinner 12	Chili, rice, corn, cornbread mix	Sugar cookie mix, pan-coated chocolate disks, chocolate pudding, fruit cocktail	
Lunch/Dinner 13	Chicken, shrimp, linguini, baby corn, carrots, water chestnuts, biscuit mix, chili garlic sauce	Yellow cake, chocolate icing, peaches	
Lunch/Dinner 14	Chicken, rice, onions, white beans, green beans, jalapeño peppers, cornbread mix, salsa, Southwest seasoning	Brownie mix, vanilla pudding, pears	

UGR-Express menus
Menu and number	Meals	Desserts	Condiments and beverages
Breakfast 1	Egg mix, beef and potatoes in cream gravy, tortillas	Apple spice cake, apple dessert	Peanut butter, strawberry jam, orange juice
Breakfast 2	Egg mix, Cajun-style chicken with andouille chicken sausage, brown rice	Breakfast cake with maple syrup, nuts and raisins	Grape juice
Breakfast 3	Egg mix, beef and potatoes in cream gravy, turkey sausage patties in brine	Breakfast cake with maple syrup, granola with milk and blueberries	Grape juice
Breakfast 4	Egg mix, corned beef hash, tortillas	Golden harvest cake with icing, apple cinnamon oatmeal	Peanut butter, grape jelly, orange juice
Lunch/Dinner 1	Chili with beans, brown rice, green beans	Chocolate cherry cake with cherry toppings, pan-coated peanut butter disks	Chocolate protein drink, orange drink
Lunch/Dinner 2	Spaghetti and meatballs, green beans	Red velvet cake with icing, pan-coated chocolate disks	Lemon-lime drink
Lunch/Dinner 3	Burgundy beef stew, brown rice, green beans	White chocolate chip cookies with cranberries, nuts and raisins	Chocolate protein drink, orange drink
Lunch/Dinner 4	Buffalo chicken, white rice, carrots	Peanut butter cookies with chocolate chips, pan-coated peanut butter disks	Grape drink
Lunch/Dinner 5	Cajun-style chicken with andouille chicken sausage, white rice, corn	Yellow cake with chocolate icing, pan-coated chocolate disks	Fruit punch
Lunch/Dinner 6	Chicken chili, white rice, carrots	White chocolate chip cookies with cranberries, jalapeño cashews	Jalapeño cheese spread, fruit punch
Lunch/Dinner 7	Beef fajita filling, tortillas, corn	Carrot cake with icing	Chocolate protein drink, orange drink
Lunch/Dinner 8	Chicken breast with gravy, sweet potato casserole, green beans	Peanut butter cookies with chocolate chips, nuts and raisins	Grape drink
Holiday Menu	Turkey slices, stuffing, mashed potatoes with gravy, carrots	Pan-coated chocolate disks, nuts and raisins	Cranberry sauce, drink mixes

== Production ==
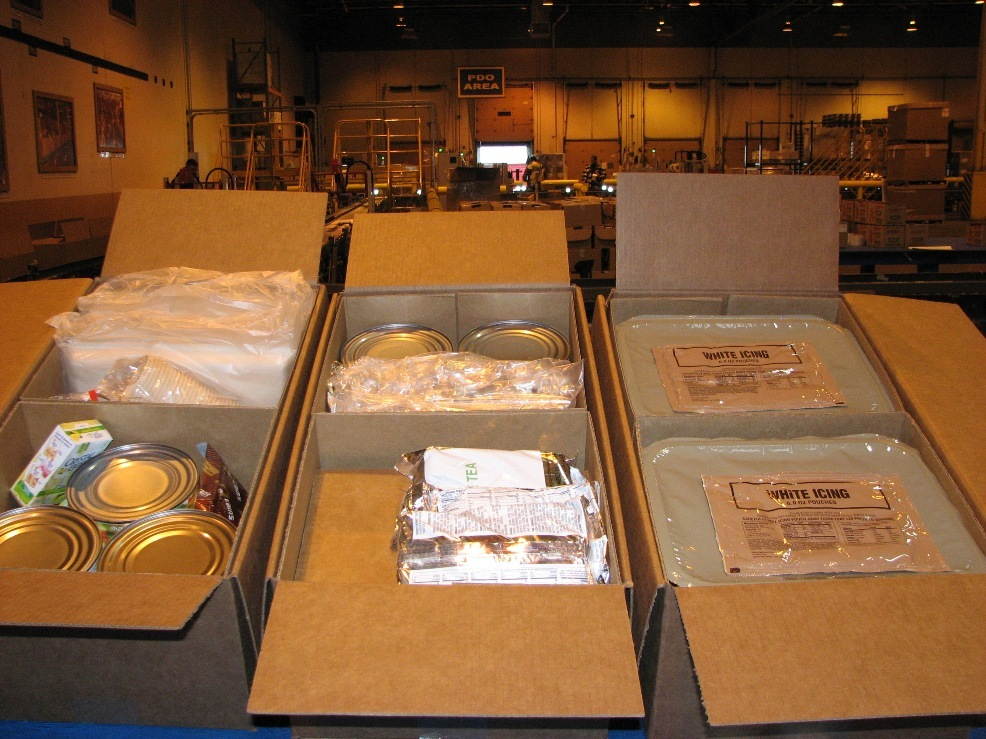
Packaged UGRs at a DLA distribution center in Tracy, California

A variety of contractors are involved in the production, management, and distribution of UGRs and their contents, including (as of 2023) ABC Ventures, AmeriQual, Atlantic, Chef Minute Meals, Club Tex, Envision, Inc., Epic Foods, Gossner Foods, Hershey, HOIST, LC Industries, Nex-Xos, OhSix, Oregon Freeze Dry, Sterling Foods, Sopakco, Valley Foods, Werling Meats, and Wornick. More than 60,000 UGRs are produced each year.

UGRs are supplied by the DLA's Operational Rations Division. UGRs, like other rations, cannot be sold to individuals, and are only supplied or sold to the U.S. military, the DoD, the federal government, government employee commissaries, government contractors (if their contract specifically permits such purchases), foreign governments with authorized contractual relationships, and civilians as humanitarian aid.

== Reception ==
American service members generally find UGRs to taste better than MREs. The UGR-E in particular was positively received, with the holiday menu singled out as "a morale booster" for soldiers otherwise unable to have proper Thanksgiving or Christmas dinners on deployment. However, some items—namely egg dishes, as reported by Stars and Stripes in 2005—are widely disliked due to poor taste. Some soldiers have also cautioned against mixing or switching between UGRs and MREs, which is said to cause constipation.

== See also ==
- K-ration – older multiple-course field ration
- 5-in-1 ration – older group ration for five soldiers
- 10-in-1 food parcel – older group ration for ten soldiers
