= Implications of U.S. gene patent invalidation on Australia =

International relations issue

On 29 March 2010, the US District Court for the Southern District of New York found several of the patent claims on the BRCA1 and BRCA2 breast cancer genes held by Myriad Genetics to be invalid. The patents were initially issued on the basis that the genes were isolated and purified to a non-naturally occurring state, however the court found, amongst other things, that the purification was not markedly different from a product of nature and thus was not patentable. The ruling may have implications for holders of other gene patents and the patentability of other naturally occurring substances. It has the potential to directly affect the operation of the healthcare and medical research industries, particularly with regards to cancer treatment and prevention, and may alter the accessibility of such therapies to patients.

Myriad Genetics' patents for the testing of the breast cancer genes are currently licensed for use in Australia to Genetic Technologies Limited. Genetic Technologies attempted to enforce its rights and stop other laboratories from performing the tests as recently as 2008, but was forced to back down following public protest. The US court decision has prompted further debate about the legitimacy of gene patents in Australia. A Federal Government inquiry into the issue is currently underway and is expected to report in September 2013.

== Operation of gene patents prior to invalidation ==
=== Awarding of BRCA1 and BRCA2 patents in US ===
==== Patentable subject matter ====
There are no special proscriptions for specific subject matter in US patent law, and Congress and the courts have consistently declined to enact limitations on patentable subject matter for specific industries. Accordingly, a DNA sequence, like other molecules, is eligible to be considered for patenting by the United States Patent and Trademark Office, provided that the patentee alters its environment or structure. Myriad Genetics' patent applications were eligible as the BRCA genes were isolated from their natural environment.

==== Tests ====
Under international standards, patentable matter must satisfy tests of novelty, inventive step and industrial application, to protect subject matter in the public domain. The industrial application step is the most difficult to meet under US patent law. A DNA sequence is only able to meet this criterion if a direct industrial use for the sequence can be identified. This would not have been difficult for Myriad Genetics to demonstrate in its BRCA patent applications, as its inventions were designed for the purposes of testing subjects for their susceptibility to breast and ovarian cancers.

International trade law dictates that a country can apply no additional tests in evaluating patentability, and must apply these tests without discriminating against biological inventions. Therefore, ethics-based criteria would not have factored into the USPTO's decision to allow Myriad Genetics to patent the BRCA1 and BRCA2 genes.

==== Scope of awarded patents ====
Myriad Genetics' BRCA patents have broad scope in the US. The company's claims consist of harmful mutations in the BRCA1 and BRCA2 genes, the use of the mutations to diagnose and screen for breast and ovarian cancers, and the development of treatments for these cancers.

=== Application of BRCA1 and BRCA2 patents in US market ===
==== Monopolistic behaviour ====
Although Myriad Genetics is one of few gene patent holders to seek infringement litigation against its patents and has only done so twice, the existing threat of litigation, according to anecdotal evidence from some laboratories, has been sufficient to keep competitors in the US from challenging Myriad Genetics' monopoly on BRCA gene testing. As a result, the company's monopoly may inhibit research and prevent the development of improvements in breast cancer testing technology. A counter-argument is that gene patents encourage innovation because patents can provide financial rewards.

==== Accessibility of BRCA testing ====
Myriad Genetics has used sequencing of the BRCA genes to develop a test for hereditary breast and ovarian cancers, which it markets to laboratories as BRACAnalysis. As at 2010, the test costs US$3,400, which is three times the cost of pre-patented testing. The company currently has agreements with major health organisations in the US and international licensing agreements for exclusive provisions. Consequently, individuals wishing to be tested for breast or ovarian cancer predisposition would be unable to circumnavigate Myriad Genetics' prices either within the US or by seeking testing abroad. Accessibility therefore remains an issue, despite the widespread availability of testing.

=== Awarding of BRCA1 and BRCA2 patent licenses in Australia ===
==== Patentable subject matter ====
Although Australia's Patents Act 1990, prohibits patenting 'human beings and the biological processes for their generation', in recent times virtually no class of patent matter has been held unpatentable by the courts. Like the USPTO, the Australian Patent Office accepts applications for human gene and gene sequences, provided that they have been separated from the human body. In Bristol-Myers Squibb, Finkelstein J declared that it was up to the Australian Parliament to amend the Patents Act 1990 if it did not consider medical treatment patentable. In 2015, the High Court of Australia unanimously ruled that isolated nucleic acid does not qualify as proper subject matter for patent protection. This decision moves Australia's laws regarding patentable subject matter closer towards those of the US.

==== Tests ====
Under section 18 of the Patents Act 1990, a patent can only be granted if the subject matter is a manner of manufacture (invention) within section 6 of the Statute of Monopolies 1623, which is novel and involves an inventive step when compared to the prior art base, and is useful. In light of the absence of special treatment for biotechnology-related processes, and the innovativeness and usefulness of its patents, it is unlikely that Genetic Technologies' BRCA licenses could be successfully contested under Australian patent law.

==== Challenges to license validity ====
Under section 46 of the Trade Practices Act 1974, a corporation with a substantial degree of market power is prohibited from taking advantage of its power to substantially damage competition. However, recent court decisions have been reluctant to apply this section to invalidate patents. For example, in Warman International v Envirotech Australia Pty Ltd, Wilcox J held that "to exercise in good faith an extraneous legal right, though the effect may be to lessen, or even eliminate competition, is to take advantage of that right, not of market power." Given the broad claims of gene sequence patents, such as the BRCA patents licensed to Genetic Technologies, and the courts' limited regard for anti-competition provisions, it is unlikely that Genetic Technologies' monopoly could be contested under the Trade Practices Act 1974. This could potentially limit the availability of products and processes related to the BRCA genes.

=== Application of BRCA1 and BRCA2 patent licenses in Australian market ===
==== Monopolistic behaviour ====
Genetic Technologies has had less success than Myriad Genetics in enforcing its exclusive rights to BRCA gene testing in its home country. Genetic Technologies has made multiple attempts to force other laboratories to stop performing BRCA tests, but yielded to public pressure to cease its attempts.

==== Accessibility of BRCA Testing ====
The Australian Law Reform Commission has declined to recommend amendments to gene patent and licensing laws on the basis that there is a lack of evidence that gene patenting and licensing has significantly affected Australian health care costs. The BRCA test would have cost A$2,100 through Genetic Technologies, but public laboratory BRCA tests are subsidised by the federal government.

Genetic Technologies' failure to enforce its patent rights may embolden other players in the biomedical industry to pursue research and development related to patented gene sequences. Conversely, it could serve as a demotivator for Genetic Technologies. The effects of gene patents on development in the medical industry will become clearer when an Australian Senate inquiry report is released in June 2010.

== US court decision on gene patents ==
On 29 March 2010, Judge Robert Sweet of the US District Court for the Southern District of New York found that there was no evidence Myriad Genetics went to any great length in inventing a process to isolate the genes in question. As such he dismissed the case on a summary hearing in favour of the plaintiff, the American Civil Liberties Union, as being the 'longest of long shots'. Justice Sweet found no evidence which could be considered by a jury in favour of the defendant, and dismissed the argument that the gene should be patented on the basis that it was isolated from the human body, referring to the practice as a 'lawyers trick'. Myriad Genetics has claimed it will appeal the decision up to the US Supreme Court to obtain an authoritative and binding decision, which they have lost as of 15 June 2013.

Myriad Genetics has a number of possible arguments that it could put forward in any forthcoming appeals, and will likely be focussing on the law surrounding validation of gene patents based on their isolation. The company argues that the fact that it has been able to isolate the genes should be considered. This is a direct derivative of the black letter law which states that if the gene was newly isolated and characterised, then it was not a mere discovery; it was an industrially applicable technical solution to a technical problem.

Conversely, the notion that the patenting of human genes is invalid may have support in the decision reached in the Howard Florey/Relaxin case, where an attempt was made to take out a patent on a naturally occurring human hormone. The verdict from this case stated that 'to find a substance freely occurring in nature is a mere discovery and therefore not patentable. However, if the substance found in nature has first to be isolated from its surroundings and a process for obtaining it is developed, that process is patentable.'

=== Implications of the court's decision on the US industry ===
The President and CEO of Myriad Genetics, Peter Meldrum, claims that the existence of gene patents and their granting to young start-up biotechnology companies is crucial for the development of the industry. He said that the decision to invalidate the patents would stifle the industry by not giving the needed support and incentives for biotechnology start-ups. The American Civil Liberties Union counters that with the patents now invalidated, the industry will prosper due to the gene or DNA in question now not being reserved exclusively for a particular group of industry participants.

=== Relevance of the US court decision to Australia ===
The US court decision will have no official bearing on Australian percent as the jurisdictions are entirely separate, and as such the doctrine of stare decesis will not apply. However, the close alignment of the two countries' legal systems and business interests may signal knock-on effects in Australia, with the potential for the US verdict to establish persuasive precedent.

The stance of the Australian Government and subsequent policy decisions regarding the validity of gene patents are likely to be shaped by two competing issues; one being the government's objective to encourage innovation, and the other of whether to follow a trend to allow the legal patenting of human genes, as has been the case in the US.

== Australian policy direction on gene patents ==
=== Australian Law Reform Commission report ===
A report into human genes and health was released by the ALRC in 2004. It contained 50 key recommendations, none of which were directed solely at the patenting of genetic materials and technologies; proposing specific laws for genetic materials and technologies may have implications for Australia's compliance with various obligations under several international trade agreements. Recommendations were directed at improvements in the patent system more generally, with many encouraging greater utilisation of existing mechanisms currently within the Patents Act 1990 and the Trade Practices Act 1974. The report explicitly recommended that social or ethical concerns should not be added as unequivocal grounds for excluding an invention from patentability under the Patents Act 1990. The ALRC did concede, however, that arguments in favour of a ban on genetic information were 'attractive'.

The ALRC's report focussed on a number of areas and detailed recommendations on how each of these areas could be improved. A significant section of the report was Part B: Patent Laws and Practices, which describes the system of obtaining, maintaining and challenging patent protection in Australia, providing international comparisons where relevant.

The ALRC concluded that inventions involving genetic materials and technologies should be assessed according to the same legislative criteria as other inventions, however it found that gene patents do highlight issues of an invention's 'usefulness' under Australian law. In response to this concern, the ALRC recommended reforms to increase the burden of proof on applicants to show 'usefulness' during the standard patent application process. The fundamental idea behind this is to enable registered patents to withstand potential challenges. Such a recommendation is reliant on the development of specific guidelines to assist patent examiners in applying any revised 'usefulness' requirements.

A striking finding of the ALRC report was that due to existing impediments to amending the Patents Act 1990 such as international treaty obligations and the reliance of the biotechnology industry on patents for revenue, the Act 'should not be amended to exclude genetic materials or technologies for, patentability; or to provide a new medical treatment exclusion; or to expand the existing circumstances in which social and ethical considerations may be taken into account in decisions about granting patents'. Given the size and nature of the Australian biotechnology industry, such a conclusion was likely expected, as patent licensing is particularly important to facilitate further research. Additionally, as evidence at the time did not suggest that restrictive licensing practices were pervasive in the industry, it was consequently recommended that the nation's peak industry body, AusBiotech Ltd, should develop model licensing agreements for the industry. Recommendations did not extend to a statutory licensing scheme.

Another major recommendation of the ALRC was to amend the Trade Practices Act 1974 to clarify the relationship between Part IV of the Act and international property rights. Moreover, healthcare bodies were urged to make use of existing complaint procedures under the TPA, especially where evidence of anti-competitive conduct existed.

Overall, the ALRC report's recommendations do not require legislative change, but rather they involve the development of revised guidelines or alternative action by the government and/or non-governmental organisations.

=== Australian Senate inquiry ===
Further debate and discussion surrounding the issue of gene patentability was conducted between 2008 and 2010 by the Australian Senate Community Affairs Committee with its Inquiry into Gene Patents.

Noteworthy submissions such as that from Cancer Council Australia urged the government to outright exclude gene sequences and other related findings from the definition of patentable subject matter, as a long-term solution to increasing cost and access problems associated with patented genetic material. The submission details how gene patenting can actively discourage scientific research and discovery to a larger extent that it rewards innovation. While conceding that legislative action alone is not an effective long-term solution, the Cancer Council stresses the importance of increasing the availability of resources to the Australian Competition & Consumer Commission. This proposed solution is in line with the ALRC's report recommendation for a more extensive application of the Trade Practices Act 1974.

These views were not shared by the Australian biotechnology industry, as represented by AusBiotech. AusBiotech's submission to the inquiry sends a message to the Senate that such patents have global relevance across the industry, and further details how the need for patent protection in the biotechnology industry is the starting point for the development of potential products. The submission concluded that any proposed amendment to current legislation would prevent a significant proportion of the Australian biotechnology industry from protecting innovations, resulting in an adverse effect on potential commercialisation opportunities and reduced investment. The end result would be argued as having a detrimental effect on the Australian healthcare and medical research industries.

In 2010, the Senate Community Affairs Reference Committee inquiry into Gene Patents concludes. A divided Committee did not support a ban on human genetic materials but rejects IP Australia's justification for patenting genetic information.

Senator Bill Heffernan, a minority member of the committee, introduces a private members bill to ban the patenting of human genetic materials and 'biological materials' drafted with the assistance of Sydney-based IP lawyer and academic, Dr Luigi Palombi.

Senator Heffernan's Patents Amendment (Human Genes and Biological Materials) Bill 2010 was referred to the Senate Legal and Constitutional Legislation Committee for review in 2011 and rejected after fierce lobbying by the pharmaceutical industry. At the inquiry, Australia's Department of Health and Ageing presented evidence supporting the "intention" of the Bill, but not its specific language.

=== Possible causes of action ===
The case for invalidation of gene patents in Australia seems unlikely, chiefly because of the growing nature of the biotechnology industry and its inherently high dependence on patents.

Existing invalidation mechanisms in the Patents Act 1990 seem to offer little assistance in the matter. Section 50(1)(a) of the Act gives the Commissioner of Patents the discretion to reject a patent application on the grounds that the use of the invention would be contrary to law. In deciding whether to exercise this discretionary power, an examiner must have close regard to whether an invention is primarily intended for an unlawful use. Gene patents are generally described to have a lawful use for their invention, thus they have not been excluded on this ground. As at May 2010, no Australian regulation makes the use of gene-related inventions unlawful.

As a member of the World Trade Organization, Australia is required to comply with the Trade-Related Aspects of Intellectual Property (TRIPS) agreement, that specifically requires patents to be made available for all fields of technology without discrimination. Any attempt by Australian legislators to alter the Patents Act 1990 by introducing a higher threshold of patentability or a general exclusion for gene technologies may breach obligations under TRIPS. While TRIPS does offer some provisions for exceptions, the full impact of these sections would adversely affect the level of domestic innovation and cross-country trading.

== See also ==
- Office of the Gene Technology Regulator
