= Regulation of genetic engineering =

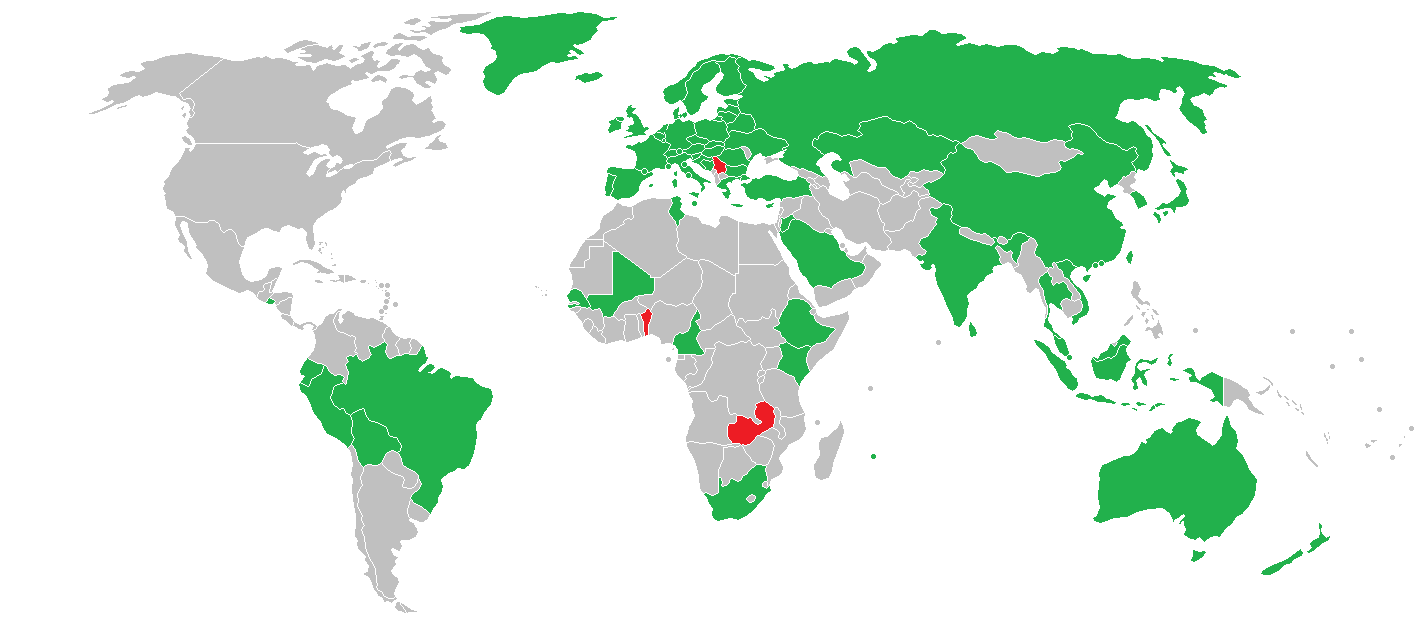
Green: Mandatory labeling required; Red: Ban on import and cultivation of genetically engineered food.

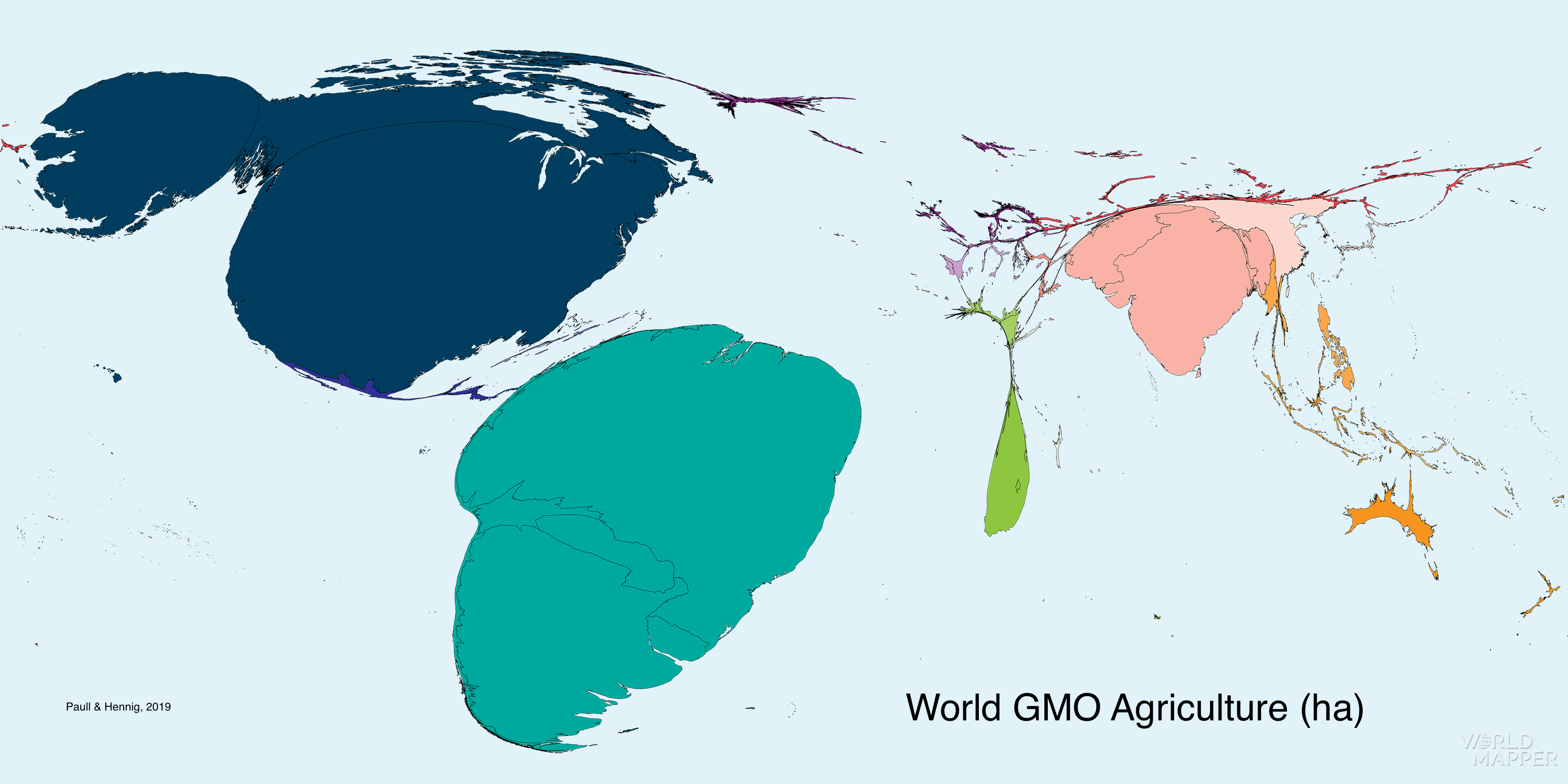
World map of GMO agriculture (hectares)

The regulation of genetic engineering varies widely by country. Countries such as the United States, Canada, Lebanon and Egypt use substantial equivalence as the starting point when assessing safety, while many countries such as those in the European Union, Brazil and China authorize GMO cultivation on a case-by-case basis. Many countries allow the import of GM food with authorization, but either do not allow its cultivation (Russia, Norway, Israel) or have provisions for cultivation, but no GM products are yet produced (Japan, South Korea). Most countries that do not allow for GMO cultivation do permit research. Most (85%) of the world's GMO crops are grown in the Americas (North and South). One of the key issues concerning regulators is whether GM products should be labeled. Labeling of GMO products in the marketplace is required in 64 countries. Labeling can be mandatory up to a threshold GM content level (which varies between countries) or voluntary. A study investigating voluntary labeling in South Africa found that 31% of products labeled as GMO-free had a GM content above 1.0%. In Canada and the US labeling of GM food is voluntary, while in Europe all food (including processed food) or feed which contains greater than 0.9% of approved GMOs must be labelled.

There is a scientific consensus that currently available food derived from GM crops poses no greater risk to human health than conventional food, but that each GM food needs to be tested on a case-by-case basis before introduction. Nonetheless, members of the public are much less likely than scientists to perceive GM foods as safe. The legal and regulatory status of GM foods varies by country, with some nations banning or restricting them, and others permitting them with widely differing degrees of regulation.

There is no evidence to support the idea that the consumption of approved GM food has a detrimental effect on human health. Some scientists and advocacy groups, such as Greenpeace and World Wildlife Fund, have however called for additional and more rigorous testing for GM food.

== History ==
The development of a regulatory framework concerning genetic engineering began in 1975, at Asilomar, California. The first use of Recombinant DNA (rDNA) technology had just been successfully accomplished by Stanley Cohen and Herbert Boyer two years previously and the scientific community recognized that as well as benefits this technology could also pose some risks. The Asilomar meeting recommended a set of guidelines regarding the cautious use of recombinant technology and any products resulting from that technology. The Asilomar recommendations were voluntary, but in 1976 the US National Institute of Health (NIH) formed a rDNA advisory committee. This was followed by other regulatory offices (the United States Department of Agriculture (USDA), Environmental Protection Agency (EPA) and Food and Drug Administration (FDA)), effectively making all rDNA research tightly regulated in the US.

In 1982 the Organisation for Economic Co-operation and Development (OECD) released a report into the potential hazards of releasing genetically modified organisms (GMOs) into the environment as the first transgenic plants were being developed. As the technology improved and genetically organisms moved from model organisms to potential commercial products the US established a committee at the Office of Science and Technology (OSTP) to develop mechanisms to regulate the developing technology. In 1986 the OSTP assigned regulatory approval of genetically modified plants in the US to the USDA, FDA and EPA.

The basic concepts for the safety assessment of foods derived from GMOs have been developed in close collaboration under the auspices of the OECD, the World Health Organization (WHO) and Food and Agriculture Organization (FAO). A first joint FAO/WHO consultation in 1990 resulted in the publication of the report 'Strategies for Assessing the Safety of Foods Produced by Biotechnology' in 1991. Building on that, an international consensus was reached by the OECD's Group of National Experts on Safety in Biotechnology, for assessing biotechnology in general, including field testing GM crops. That Group met again in Bergen, Norway in 1992 and reached consensus on principles for evaluating the safety of GM food; its report, 'The safety evaluation of foods derived by modern technology – concepts and principles' was published in 1993. That report recommends conducting the safety assessment of a GM food on a case-by-case basis through comparison to an existing food with a long history of safe use. This basic concept has been refined in subsequent workshops and consultations organized by the OECD, WHO, and FAO, and the OECD in particular has taken the lead in acquiring data and developing standards for conventional foods to be used in assessing substantial equivalence.

The Cartagena Protocol on Biosafety was adopted on 29 January 2000 and entered into force on 11 September 2003. It is an international treaty that governs the transfer, handling, and use of genetically modified (GM) organisms. It is focused on movement of GMOs between countries and has been called a de facto trade agreement. One hundred and seventy-two countries are members of the Protocol and many use it as a reference point for their own regulations. Also in 2003 the Codex Alimentarius Commission of the FAO/WHO adopted a set of "Principles and Guidelines on foods derived from biotechnology" to help countries coordinate and standardize regulation of GM food to help ensure public safety and facilitate international trade. and updated its guidelines for import and export of food in 2004,

The European Union first introduced laws requiring GMOs to be labelled in 1997. In 2013, Connecticut became the first state to enact a labeling law in the US, although it would not take effect until other states followed suit.

== In the laboratory ==
Institutions that conduct certain types of scientific research must obtain permission from government authorities and ethical committees before they conduct any experiments. Universities and research institutes generally have a special committee that is responsible for approving any experiments that involve genetic engineering. Many experiments also need permission from a national regulatory group or legislation. All staff must be trained in the use of GMOs and in some laboratories a biological control safety officer is appointed. All laboratories must gain approval from their regulatory agency to work with GMOs and all experiments must be documented. As of 2008 there have been no major accidents with GMOs in the lab.

The legislation covering GMOs was initially covered by adapting existing regulations in place for chemicals or other purposes, with many countries later developing specific policies aimed at genetic engineering. These are often derived from regulations and guidelines in place for the non-GMO version of the organism, although they are more severe. In many countries now the regulations are diverging, even though many of the risks and procedures are similar. Sometimes even different agencies are responsible, notably in the Netherlands where the Ministry of the Environment covers GMOs and the Ministry of Social Affairs covers the human pathogens they are derived from.

There is a near universal system for assessing the relative risks associated with GMOs and other agents to laboratory staff and the community. They are then assigned to one of four risk categories based on their virulence, the severity of disease, the mode of transmission, and the availability of preventive measures or treatments. There are some differences in how these categories are defined, such as the World Health Organization (WHO) including dangers to animals and the environment in their assessments. When there are varying levels of virulence the regulators base their classification on the highest. Accordingly, there are four biosafety levels that a laboratory can fall into, ranging from level 1 (which is suitable for working with agents not associated with disease) to level 4 (working with life-threatening agents). Different countries use different nomenclature to describe the levels and can have different requirements for what can be done at each level.

In Europe the use of living GMOs are regulated by the European Directive on the contained use of genetically modified microorganisms (GMMs). The regulations require risk assessments before use of any contained GMOs is started and assurances that the correct controls are in place. It provides the minimal standards for using GMMs, with individual countries allowed to enforce stronger controls. In the UK the Genetically Modified Organisms (Contained Use) Regulations 2014 (SI 2014/1663) provides the framework researchers must follow when using GMOs. Other legislation may be applicable depending on what research is carried out. For workplace safety these include the Health and Safety at Work etc. Act 1974, the Management of Health and Safety at Work Regulations 1999 (SI 1999/3242), the Carriage of Dangerous Goods legislation and the Control of Substances Hazardous to Health Regulations 2002 (SI 2002/2677). Environmental risks are covered by section 108(1) of the Environmental Protection Act 1990 and the Genetically Modified Organisms (Risk Assessment) (Records and Exemptions) Regulations 1996 (SI 1996/1106).

In the US the National Institute of Health (NIH) classifies GMOs into four risk groups. Risk group one is not associated with any diseases, risk group 2 is associated with diseases that are not serious, risk group 3 is associated with serious diseases where treatments are available and risk group 4 is for serious diseases with no known treatments. In 1992 the Occupational Safety and Health Administration determined that its current legislation already adequately covers the safety of laboratory workers using GMOs.

Australia has an exempt dealing for genetically modified organisms that only pose a low risk. These include systems using standard laboratory strains as the hosts, recombinant DNA that does not code for a vertebrate toxin or is not derived from a micro-organism that can cause disease in humans. Exempt dealings usually do not require approval from the national regulator. GMOs that pose a low risk if certain management practices are complied with are classified as notifiable low risk dealings. The final classification is for any uses of GMOs that do not meet the previous criteria. These are known as licensed dealings and include cloning any genes that code for vertebrate toxins or using hosts that are capable of causing disease in humans. Licensed dealings require the approval of the national regulator.

Work with exempt GMOs do not need to be carried out in certified laboratories. All others must be contained in a Physical Containment level 1 (PC1) or Physical Containment level 2 (PC2) laboratories. Laboratory work with GMOs classified as low risk, which include knockout mice, are carried out in PC1 lab. This is the case for modifications that do not confer an advantage to the animal or doesn't secrete any infectious agents. If a laboratory strain that is used isn't covered by exempt dealings or the inserted DNA could code for a pathogenic gene, it must be carried out in a PC2 laboratory.

== Release ==
The approaches taken by governments to assess and manage the risks associated with the use of genetic engineering technology and the development and release of GMOs vary from country to country, with some of the most marked differences occurring between the United States and Europe. The United States takes on a less hands-on approach to the regulation of GMOs than in Europe, with the FDA and USDA only looking over pesticide and plant health facets of GMOs. Despite the overall global increase in the production in GMOs, the European Union has still stalled GMOs fully integrating into its food supply. This has definitely affected various countries, including the United States, when trading with the EU.

=== European Union ===
The European Union enacted regulatory laws in 2003 that provided possibly the most stringent GMO regulations in the world. All GMOs, along with irradiated food, are considered "new food" and subject to extensive, case-by-case, science-based food evaluation by the European Food Safety Authority (EFSA). The criteria for authorization fall in four broad categories: "safety", "freedom of choice", "labelling", and "traceability".

The European Parliament's Committee on the Environmental, Public Health, and Consumer Protection pushed forward and adopted a "safety first" principle regarding the case of GMOs, calling for any negative health consequences from GMOs to be held liable.

The history of the development of GM crop and GM food regulations in the EU has been challenged to develop a policy environment that is (a) efficient, (b) predicable, (c) accountable, (d) durable or (e) inter- jurisdictionally aligned. However, although the European Union has had relatively strict regulations regarding genetically modified food, Europe is now allowing newer versions of modified maize and other agricultural produce. Also, the level of GMO acceptance in the European Union varies across its countries with Spain and Portugal being more permissive of GMOs than France and the Nordic population. One notable exception however is Sweden. In this country, the government has declared that the GMO definition (according to Directive 2001/18/EC) stipulates that foreign DNA needs to be present in an organism for it to qualify as a genetically modified organisms. Organisms that have the foreign DNA removed (for example via selective breeding) therefore do not qualify as GMOs, even if gene editing has been used to make the organism.

In June 2014 the European Parliament approved that individual member states are allowed to restrict or ban the growth of GM crops within their territory. Austria, France, Greece, Hungary, Germany, and Luxembourg had prohibited the growth or sale of bioengineered foods in their territory in 2015. Scotland also announced its rejection. By 2015, sixteen countries declared they want to opt out of EU-approved GM crops, including GMOs from major companies like Monsanto, Dow, Syngenta and Pioneer.

=== United States ===
The U.S. regulatory policy is governed by the Coordinated Framework for Regulation of Biotechnology The policy has three tenets: "(1) U.S. policy would focus on the product of genetic modification (GM) techniques, not the process itself, (2) only regulation grounded in verifiable scientific risks would be tolerated, and (3) GM products are on a continuum with existing products and, therefore, existing statutes are sufficient to review the products."

For a genetically modified organism to be approved for release in the U.S., it must be assessed under the Plant Protection Act by the Animal and Plant Health Inspection Service (APHIS) agency within the USDA and may also be assessed by the FDA and the EPA, depending on the intended use of the organism. The USDA evaluate the plants potential to become weeds, the FDA reviews plants that could enter or alter the food supply, and the EPA regulates genetically modified plants with pesticide properties, as well as agrochemical residues.

In 2017 a proposed rule was withdrawn by APHIS after public comment. Agricultural stakeholders especially felt it would have excessively restricted genetic engineering and even new methods of conventional plant breeding.

=== Other countries ===
The level of regulation in other countries lies in between Europe and the United States.

Common Market for Eastern and Southern Africa (COMASA) is responsible for assessing the safety of GMOs in most of Africa, although the final decision lies with each individual country.

India and China are the two largest producers of genetically modified products in Asia. The Office of Agricultural Genetic Engineering Biosafety Administration (OAGEBA) is responsible for regulation in China, while in India it is the Institutional Biosafety Committee (IBSC), Review Committee on Genetic Manipulation (RCGM) and Genetic Engineering Approval Committee (GEAC).

Brazil and Argentina are the 2nd and 3rd largest producers of GM food. In Argentine assessment of GM products for release is provided by the National Agricultural Biotechnology Advisory Committee (environmental impact), the National Service of Health and Agrifood Quality (food safety) and the National Agribusiness Direction (effect on trade), with the final decision made by the Secretariat of Agriculture, Livestock, Fishery and Food. In Brazil the National Biosafety Technical Commission is responsible for assessing environmental and food safety and prepares guidelines for transport, importation and field experiments involving GM products, while the Council of Ministers evaluates the commercial and economical issues with release.

Health Canada and the Canadian Food Inspection Agency are responsible for evaluating the safety and nutritional value of genetically modified foods released in Canada.

License applications for the release of all genetically modified organisms in Australia is overseen by the Office of the Gene Technology Regulator, while regulation is provided by the Therapeutic Goods Administration for GM medicines or Food Standards Australia New Zealand for GM food. The individual state governments can then assess the impact of release on markets and trade and apply further legislation to control approved genetically modified products. The Australian Parliament relaxed the definition of GMOs, in 2019, to exclude certain GMOs from GMO regulation and government oversight.

In Singapore, synthetic biology products are regulated as if they were genetically modified organisms under the Biological Agents and Toxins Act. For further review see Trump 2017.

In Saudi Arabia's Neom project genetically engineered agriculture is legal, encouraged, and is funded by the government as an integral part of the project.

The regulation agencies by geographical regions
Region	Regulator/s	Notes
US	USDA, FDA and EPA	
Continental Europe	European Food Safety Authority	
England	Department for Environment Food and Rural Affairs	The Scotland and Welsh governments are responsible for release in their respective countries.
Canada	Health Canada and the Canadian Food Inspection Agency	Based on whether a product has novel features regardless of method of origin
Africa	Common Market for Eastern and Southern Africa	Final decision lies with each individual country.
China	Office of Agricultural Genetic Engineering Biosafety Administration	
India	Institutional Biosafety Committee, Review Committee on Genetic Manipulation and Genetic Engineering Approval Committee	
Argentina	National Agricultural Biotechnology Advisory Committee (environmental impact), the National Service of Health and Agrifood Quality (food safety) and the National Agribusiness Direction (effect on trade)	Final decision made by the Secretariat of Agriculture, Livestock, Fishery and Food.
Brazil	National Biosafety Technical Commission (environmental and food safety) and the Council of Ministers (commercial and economical issues)	
Australia	Office of the Gene Technology Regulator (overseas all), Therapeutic Goods Administration (GM medicines) and Food Standards Australia New Zealand (GM food).	The individual state governments can then assess the impact of release on markets and trade and apply further legislation to control approved genetically modified products.

=== Labeling ===
One of the key issues concerning regulators is whether GM products should be labeled. Labeling can be mandatory up to a threshold GM content level (which varies between countries) or voluntary. A study investigating voluntary labeling in South Africa found that 31% of products labeled as GMO-free had a GM content above 1.0%. In Canada and the United States labeling of GM food is voluntary, while in Europe all food (including processed food) or feed which contains greater than 0.9% of approved GMOs must be labelled. In the US state of Oregon., voters rejected Measure 27, which would have required labeling of all genetically modified foods. Japan, Malaysia, New Zealand, and Australia require labeling so consumers can exercise choice between foods that have genetically modified, conventional or organic origins.

=== Trade ===
The Cartagena Protocol sets the requirements for the international trade of GMOs between countries that are signatories to it. Any shipments contain genetically modified organisms that are intended to be used as feed, food or for processing must be identified and a list of the transgenic events be available.

=== Substantial equivalence ===
"Substantial equivalence" is a starting point for the safety assessment for GM foods that is widely used by national and international agencies—including the Canadian Food Inspection Agency, Japan's Ministry of Health and Welfare and the U.S. Food and Drug Administration, the United Nations' Food and Agriculture Organization, the World Health Organization and the OECD.

A quote from FAO, one of the agencies that developed the concept, is useful for defining it: "Substantial equivalence embodies the concept that if a new food or food component is found to be substantially equivalent to an existing food or food component, it can be treated in the same manner with respect to safety (i.e., the food or food component can be concluded to be as safe as the conventional food or food component)". The concept of substantial equivalence also recognises the fact that existing foods often contain toxic components (usually called antinutrients) and are still able to be consumed safely—in practice there is some tolerable chemical risk taken with all foods, so a comparative method for assessing safety needs to be adopted. For instance, potatoes and tomatoes can contain toxic levels of respectively, solanine and alpha-tomatine alkaloids.

To decide if a modified product is substantially equivalent, the product is tested by the manufacturer for unexpected changes in a limited set of components such as toxins, nutrients, or allergens that are present in the unmodified food. The manufacturer's data is then assessed by a regulatory agency, such as the U.S. Food and Drug Administration. That data, along with data on the genetic modification itself and resulting proteins (or lack of protein), is submitted to regulators. If regulators determine that the submitted data show no significant difference between the modified and unmodified products, then the regulators will generally not require further food safety testing. However, if the product has no natural equivalent, or shows significant differences from the unmodified food, or for other reasons that regulators may have (for instance, if a gene produces a protein that had not been a food component before), the regulators may require that further safety testing be carried out.

A 2003 review in Trends in Biotechnology identified seven main parts of a standard safety test:

1. Study of the introduced DNA and the new proteins or metabolites that it produces;
2. Analysis of the chemical composition of the relevant plant parts, measuring nutrients, anti-nutrients as well as any natural toxins or known allergens;
3. Assess the risk of gene transfer from the food to microorganisms in the human gut;
4. Study the possibility that any new components in the food might be allergens;
5. Estimate how much of a normal diet the food will make up;
6. Estimate any toxicological or nutritional problems revealed by this data in light of data on equivalent foods;
7. Additional animal toxicity tests if there is the possibility that the food might pose a risk.

There has been discussion about applying new biochemical concepts and methods in evaluating substantial equivalence, such as metabolic profiling and protein profiling. These concepts refer, respectively, to the complete measured biochemical spectrum (total fingerprint) of compounds (metabolites) or of proteins present in a food or crop. The goal would be to compare overall the biochemical profile of a new food to an existing food to see if the new food's profile falls within the range of natural variation already exhibited by the profile of existing foods or crops. However, these techniques are not considered sufficiently evaluated, and standards have not yet been developed, to apply them.

== Genetically modified animals ==
Transgenic animals have genetically modified DNA. Animals are different from plants in a variety of ways—biology, life cycles, or potential environmental impacts. GM plants and animals were being developed around the same time, but due to the complexity of their biology and inefficiency with laboratory equipment use, their appearance in the market was delayed.

There are six categories that genetically engineered (GE) animals are approved for:

1. Use for biomedical research. Smaller mammalians can be used as models in scientific research to represent other mammals.
2. Used to develop innovative kinds of fish for environmental monitoring.
3. Used to produce proteins that humans lack. This can be for therapeutic use, for example, treatment of diseases in other mammals.
4. Use for investigating and finding cures for diseases. Can be used for introducing disease resistance in GM breeds.
5. Used to create manufacturing products for industry use.
6. Used for improving food quality.
