= Food Fray =

2009 non-fiction book by Lisa H. Weasel

Food Fray: Inside the Controversy over Genetically Modified Food
- Author: Lisa H. Weasel
- Language: English
- Subject: Genetically modified food
- Genre: Non-fiction
- Publication date: 2009
- Publication place: United States

Food Fray: Inside the Controversy over Genetically Modified Food is a 2009 non-fiction book by molecular biologist Lisa H. Weasel that details the story of genetically modified food in the United States.

== Reception ==
The book was reviewed by Miami Herald, Midwest Book Review, and Choice: Current Reviews for Academic Libraries. A Publishers Weekly review called the book "superficial and flat".

A review by Publishers Weekly said that the book "skimps on the science...focusing instead on the legal, political and emotional aspects of the tussle between big business...and environmentalists...Her account is relatively flat and superficial, doing a workmanlike job of covering political issues but leaving readers short of what they need to evaluate GM."
