= Religious views on genetically modified foods =

Religious views on genetically modified foods have been mixed, although as yet, no genetically modified foods ("GM" foods) have been designated as unacceptable by religious authorities.

== Background and history ==
Genetic engineering is a laboratory process that alters the DNA make-up of an organism. This may include deleting or adding a segment of DNA.

Genetically Modified Organisms typically refers to food products that have been altered using genetic engineering. This is done by adding DNA to a single cell, that will later be present in the rest of the organism due to cell reproduction.

Around 8000 BCE, humans used agricultural techniques such as Cross breeding to breed animals and plants with preferred traits.

In 1982, the FDA approved the first genetically modified product, insulin, for public use in the United States. In 1994, a genetically modified tomato was approved for public use by the FDA in the United States.

Common genetically modified foods include corn, soybeans, potatoes, and squash.

== Judaism ==
There is no consensus in the views of Jewish religious leaders, scholars and commentators on whether Jews can eat GM food products or engage in research in the area of GM food technology.

One perspective emphasizes that humanity was created in God's image and this means that humanity can "partner with God in the perfection of everything in the world," and therefore Jewish law accepts genetic engineering to save and prolong human life as well as increase the quality or quantity of the world's food supply.

Other perspectives hold that GM food technology is a violation of Kil'ayim, the mixed breeding of crops or livestock, and that because God made "distinctions in the natural world", Jews must honor them.

=== Kashrut ===
Kashrut laws state that all plants are considered Kosher.

Many Rabbinic authorities believe that genetic material separated from the parent organism is "inert," or separate from the parent organism. Thus, genetic material that is transferred from a non-kosher species is no longer considered food, as it does not have taste and is considered separate from the non-kosher species. Rabbinic authorities generally assert that genetic material from non-kosher species is not in itself non-kosher and does not render the new organism non-kosher.

Some may argue, however, that food made with genes from pigs or other non-kosher animals would likely be non-kosher.

Genetic engineering also poses Kashrut concerns regarding the changing of physical characteristics of animals. Kashrut only permits eating animals with split hooves that chews their cud. However, genetic engineering may permit a traditionally non-Kosher animal to attain these characteristics. This has a difficult response, according to Halakha.

== Islam ==
Islam too forbids eating of pork, and Islamic scholars have also raised concern about the theoretical production of foods with genes from pigs.

And there are varying perspectives. A seminar of Islamic scholars in Kuwait on genetics and genetic engineering in October 1998 concluded that although there are fears about the possibility of the harmful effects of GM food technology and GM food products on human beings and the environment, there are no laws within Islam which stop the genetic modification of food crops and animals. And in 2003, the Indonesian Ulemas Council (MUI) approved the importation and consumption of genetically modified food products by Indonesian Muslims. Others have written that while there are Quranic verses forbidding humanity from defacing God's creation, these "cannot be invoked as a total and radical ban on genetic engineering ... If carried too far, it would conflict with many forms of curative surgery that also entail some change in God's creation".

Voices in opposition to GMOs argue that there is no need for genetic modification of food crops because God created everything perfectly and man does not have any right to manipulate anything that God has created.

== Christianity ==
=== Roman Catholic Church ===
Views of Rome on genetic engineering In 1999, after two years of discussions, the Vatican's Pontifical Academy for Life stated that modifying the genes of plants and animals is theologically acceptable. The Guardian reported that "Bishop Elio Sgreccia, vice- president of the pontifical academy, said: 'We are increasingly encouraged that the advantages of genetic engineering of plants and animals are greater than the risks. The risks should be carefully followed through openness, analysis and controls, but without a sense of alarm.' Referring to genetically modified products such as corn and soya, Sgreccia added: 'We give it a prudent 'yes' We cannot agree with the position of some groups that say it is against the will of God to meddle with the genetic make-up of plants and animals.'"

In 2000 as part of the Great Jubilee Pope John Paul II gave an address concerning agriculture, at which he said: The "famous words of Genesis entrust the earth to man's use, not abuse. They do not make man the absolute arbiter of the earth's governance, but the Creator's "co-worker": a stupendous mission, but one which is also marked by precise boundaries that can never be transgressed with impunity. This is a principle to be remembered in agricultural production itself, whenever there is a question of its advance through the application of biotechnologies, which cannot be evaluated solely on the basis of immediate economic interests. They must be submitted beforehand to rigorous scientific and ethical examination, to prevent them from becoming disastrous for human health and the future of the earth."

==== Other studies and statements ====
A 2002 meeting between bishops and scientists in the Philippines concluded that biotechnology could be an important stepping stone in the struggle against hunger and environmental pollution.

A 2003 symposium gathered by Cardinal Renato T. Martino has examined the use of GMOs in modern agriculture. The symposium's study argued that the future of humanity is at stake and that there is no room for the ideological arguments advanced by environmentalists. Velasio De Paolis, a professor of canon law at the Pontifical Urban University, has said that it was "easy to say no to GM food if your stomach is full".

In 2008, Fr. Sean McDonagh, an Irish Columban priest and "well-known commentator on environmental issues", questioned whether hosts from transgenic wheat could ever be approved by the Congregation for the Doctrine of the Faith because of the Church's strict rules regarding sacramental bread. He specifically cited canon 924, which stipulates the bread must be wheaten only, and recently made, so that there is no danger of corruption.

A 2009 study on genetically modified organisms sponsored by the Pontifical Academy of Sciences came to a favorable conclusion on GMOs, viewing them as praiseworthy for improving the lives of the poor.

==== Philippines ====
The Philippines is a predominantly Catholic country, and official pronouncements of the Catholic Bishops Conference of the Philippines (CBCP) exert a strong influence in policy making and the CBCP has not supported biotechnology, and probably will not until there is an official endorsement from the Pope. President Arroyo’s visit to Rome on September 27, 2003, she apparently consulted Pope John Paul II about the Church position on biotechnology. On the basis of that meeting, she issued a statement indicating that she felt it was important that opponents of GMOs knew that according to the Vatican, GMOs are not immoral. The CBCP issued a statement in response stating that the Pope had not endorsed GMOs. In 2009 Bishop Vicente Navarra of the Diocese of Bacolod in the Philippines issued a pastoral letter calling on the Negros Occidental and Bacolod City governments to continue banning the entry of GMO products.

=== Anabaptist Christianity ===
About 550 Amish farmers in Pennsylvania have adopted nicotine-free tobacco since 2001, because it pays "about $1.50 per pound for the nicotine-free tobacco, nearly double the 80-cent-per-pound rate for traditional tobacco. GMO crops do not conflict with the Amish lifestyle.

=== Anglican Communion ===
In 2004, the Church Environmental Network, representing members of the Anglican church of South Africa, spoke out against the South African government's backing of genetically modified organisms (GMOs).

Christian Aid, a British ecumenical group, released a paper in 2000 that expressed sharp concerns about the agricultural biotechnology industry, particularly with regard to its potential effects on impoverished people and economic development in the developing world.

=== Rastafarian ===
While the Rastafari Movement as a whole has no central authority, a Rastafari Code of Conduct was ratified in July–August 2008 at a meeting in Jamaica of the Nyah Binghi Order, one of the three houses of the Rastafari movement; that Code defines GM food as not Ital.
