= GMO Answers =

Front group launched by the agricultural biotechnology industry in July 2013

- Owner: CropLife International
- Website: gmoanswers.com
- Launched: July 2013; 13 years ago
- Current status: Online

GMO Answers is a project launched by the agricultural biotechnology industry in July 2013 to participate in public debate around genetically modified organisms (GMOs) in crops in the U.S. food supply.

Cathleen Enright, then executive director of Council for Biotechnology Information, said GMO Answers was not specifically created to advocate against GMO labeling, but rather to provide accurate information about GMOs to consumers: "We have been accused of purposely hiding information. We haven't done that but now we will open the doors and provide information."

Anti-GMO activists have characterized GMO Answers as a public relations ploy by the seed biotech industry to influence an intensifying debate concerning the safety of GMOs and GMO labeling. Huffington Post reported on 130 pages of Ketchum PR internal documents discussing the launch of GMO Answers with a strategy of "embracing skepticism." Ketchum's internal documents also discussed “ongoing development of relationships” with Washington Post columnist Tamar Haspel as well as The Motley Fool and Politico.

== Background ==
The safety of GMOs has been described as the "most visible and contentious" public debate regarding food production technologies used in the U.S. food supply chain. In a January 2013 New York Times poll, 93 percent of respondents said that foods containing GMOs or genetically engineered ingredients should be identified. The Pew Research Center conducted a survey of 1,480 Americans and the results showed that over a third of Americans believe genetically modified food poses health risks. The survey made the statement, "GM foods are ___ for health than non-GM foods." 39% of the respondents responded "worse", 48% responded, no better or no worse, 10% responded better, leaving 3% of respondents that didn't answer the question. The data shows there is still a tendency for the average American to believe GM food is worse for health. Polls by the Oklahoma State University Department of Agricultural Economics have shown that over 80 percent of respondents supported mandatory labels of genetically modified food, but the same number supported labels for food containing DNA.

There is a scientific consensus that currently available food derived from GM crops poses no greater risk to human health than conventional food, but that each GM food needs to be tested on a case-by-case basis before introduction. Nonetheless, members of the public are much less likely than scientists to perceive GM foods as safe. The legal and regulatory status of GM foods varies by country, with some nations banning or restricting them, and others permitting them with widely differing degrees of regulation.

=== GMO labeling legislation ===
Growing consumer interest in transparency regarding food production has given rise to GMO labeling initiatives across the U.S. in several states. In 2012 and 2013, GMO labeling ballot initiatives were defeated in California and Washington state. Also in December 2013, Connecticut became the first state in the U.S. to enact GMO labeling legislation, followed by Maine a month later. The Connecticut and Maine bills required that any combination of contiguous Northeast states totaling at least 20 million residents must adopt similar laws in order for the regulations to take effect.

In August 2013, a Scientific American editorial called mandatory labeling of genetically modified foods a "bad idea":

The American Association for the Advancement of Science, the World Health Organization and the exceptionally vigilant European Union agree that GMOs are just as safe as other foods ... The U.S. Food and Drug Administration has tested all the GMOs on the market to determine whether they are toxic or allergenic. They are not.

=== GMO labeling initiatives by U.S. food producers ===
In 2013, several U.S. food producers announced plans to label or disclose the presence of GMOs in their products, including grocery retailer Whole Foods Market, restaurant chain Chipotle Mexican Grill, Inc., and ice cream maker Ben & Jerry's. In January 2014, General Mills, Inc. announced that it began manufacturing GMO-free original Cheerios in late 2013.

== GMOAnswers.com ==
In July 2013, the seed biotech industry and its partners in farming and agriculture launched the GMOAnswers.com website "to combat mounting opposition to genetically modified foods among consumer groups and activists."

Also in July 2013, Paul Schickler, president of DuPont Pioneer, the agricultural unit of DuPont, said anti-GMO interests had used the Internet effectively to disseminate their message, and that the seed biotech industry sought to employ the Internet and social media channels to similar effect: "[GMOAnswers.com] is an effort to increase the dialogue ... Over time I think we'll come to a common understanding."
