= Substantial equivalence =

Food safety testing method

In food safety, the concept of substantial equivalence holds that the safety of a new food, particularly one that has been genetically modified (GM), may be assessed by comparing it with a similar traditional food that has proven safe in normal use over time. It was first formulated as a food safety policy in 1993, by the Organisation for Economic Co-operation and Development (OECD).

As part of a food safety testing process, substantial equivalence is the initial step, establishing toxicological and nutritional differences in the new food compared to a conventional counterpart—differences are analyzed and evaluated, and further testing may be conducted, leading to a final safety assessment.

Substantial equivalence is the underlying principle in GM food safety assessment for a number of national and international agencies, including the Canadian Food Inspection Agency (CFIA), Japan's Ministry of Health, Labour and Welfare (MHLW), the US Food and Drug Administration (FDA), and the United Nations' Food and Agriculture Organization (FAO) and World Health Organization.

== Origin ==
The concept of comparing genetically modified foods to traditional foods as a basis for safety assessment was first introduced as a recommendation during the 1990 Joint FAO/WHO Expert Consultation on biotechnology and food safety (a scientific conference of officials and industry), although the term substantial equivalence was not used. Adopting the term, substantial equivalence was formulated as a food safety policy by the OECD, first described in their 1993 report, "Safety Evaluation of Foods Derived by Modern Biotechnology: Concepts and Principles.

The term was borrowed from the FDA's 1976 substantial equivalence definition for new medical devices—under Premarket Notification 510(k), a new Class II device that is essentially similar to an existing device can be cleared for release without further testing. The underlying approach of comparing a new product or technique to an existing one has long been used in various fields of science and technology.

The concept was reinforced by a joint FAO/WHO expert consultation in 1996. This meeting emphasized that substantial equivalence does not in itself constitute a safety assessment, but provides a framework for organizing the analysis of foods derived from plants with recombinant DNA, considering their characteristics and composition. When a new product is considered equivalent to a conventional food with a history of safe consumption, it is understood that it will be as safe as the traditional food, provided it is used under similar consumption and processing standards. The FAO emphasizes that one of the main advantages of the concept is its flexibility, which is useful in assessing the safety of foods derived from modern biotechnology. It allows for the identification of differences that may require further investigation. Because it is based on a comparison, it can be applied at different stages of the food chain, such as in the harvested product, in processed fractions, or in the final food, directing the analysis to the most appropriate level according to the nature of the product.

In June 1999, G8 leaders requested the OECD to “undertake a study on the implications of biotechnology and other aspects of food safety.” In 2000, the OECD Edinburgh Conference on Scientific and Health Aspects of Genetically Modified Foods was held. Following those discussions, the OECD published an opinion that substantial equivalence is an important tool in analyzing the safety of novel foods, including GM foods. The document noted that substantial equivalence serves as a framework for approaching food safety assessment, rather than functioning as a quantitative standard or measure.

In 2000, a new joint FAO/WHO consultation on foods derived from biotechnology revisited the concept. The group concluded that safety assessment should follow an integrated, step-by-step, case-by-case approach, supported by a structured set of questions. It was reaffirmed that substantial equivalence, when comparing foods derived from genetically modified plants with their conventional counterparts, is the most appropriate strategy for identifying potential safety and nutrition issues. It was also emphasized that substantial equivalence does not replace risk analysis—since it does not directly characterize hazards—but should guide the comparative process in relation to the conventional food used as a reference. The experts considered the methodology used in the safety assessment of genetically modified foods approved commercially to date to be satisfactory and concluded that the application of substantial equivalence strengthens the existing assessment framework. According to the consultation, there were no alternative strategies at the time that offered greater safety guarantees.

== Description ==
The OECD bases the substantial equivalence principle on a definition of food safety where we can assume that a food is safe for consumption if it has been eaten over time without evident harm. It recognizes that traditional foods may naturally contain toxic components (usually called antinutrients)—such as the glycoalkaloids solanine in potatoes and alpha-tomatine in tomatoes—which do not affect their safety when prepared and eaten in traditional ways. (Note: "The safety of food for human consumption is based on the concept that there should be a reasonable certainty that no harm will result from intended uses under the anticipated conditions of consumption. Historically, foods prepared and used in traditional ways have been considered to be safe on the basis of long-term experience, even though they may have contained natural toxicants or anti-nutritional substances. In principle, food has been presumed to be safe unless a significant hazard was identified." (OECD, 1993))

The report proposes that, while biotechnology broadens the scope of food modification, it does not inherently introduce additional risk, and therefore, GM products may be assessed in the same way as conventionally bred products. Further, the relative precision of biotech methods should allow assessment to be focused on the most likely problem areas. The concept of substantial equivalence is then described as a comparison between a GM food and a similar conventional food, taking into account food processing, and how the food is normally consumed, including quantity, dietary patterns, and the characteristics of the consuming population. (Note: "For foods and food components from organisms developed by the application of modern biotechnology, the most practical approach to the determination of safety is to consider whether they are substantially equivalent to analogous conventional food products, if such exist. Account should be taken of the processing that the food may undergo, as well as the intended use and the exposure. Exposure includes such parameters as the amount of food or food component(s) in the diet, the pattern of dietary consumption, and the characteristics of the consuming population(s). The approach provides a basis for an evaluation of food safety and nutritional quality." (OECD, 1993))

== Assessment of GM food ==
Substantial equivalence is the starting point for GM food safety assessment: significant differences between a new food item and its conventional counterpart would indicate the need for further testing. A "targeted approach" is taken, by selecting specific relevant molecules for comparison. For plants, selection of a suitable comparator may involve growing the new plant side by side with genetically closely related varieties, or using publicly available composition data for closely related varieties.

Evaluation for substantial equivalence can be applied at different points in the food chain, from unprocessed harvested crop to final ingredient or product, depending on the nature of the food item and its intended use.

For a GM plant, the overall evaluation process may be viewed in four phases:

1. Substantial equivalence analysis
  Considering introduced genes, newly expressed proteins, and new secondary metabolites
2. Toxicological and nutritional analysis of detected differences
  Gene transfer, allergenicity, degradation characteristics, bioavailability, toxicity, and estimated intake levels
3. Toxicological and nutritional evaluation
  If necessary, additional toxicity testing, possibly including whole foods (return to Phase 2).
4. Final safety assessment of GM plant

There is a scientific consensus that currently available food derived from GM crops poses no greater risk to human health than conventional food, but that each GM food needs to be tested on a case-by-case basis before introduction. Nonetheless, members of the public are much less likely than scientists to perceive GM foods as safe. The legal and regulatory status of GM foods varies by country, with some nations banning or restricting them, and others permitting them with widely differing degrees of regulation, which varied due to geographical, religious, social, and other factors.

== Technological developments ==
There has been discussion about applying new biochemical concepts and methods in evaluating substantial equivalence, such as metabolic profiling and protein profiling. These concepts refer, respectively, to the complete measured biochemical spectrum (total fingerprint) of compounds (metabolites) or of proteins present in a food or crop. The goal would be to compare overall the biochemical profile of a new food to an existing food to see if the new food's profile falls within the range of natural variation already exhibited by the profile of existing foods or crops. However, these techniques are not considered sufficiently evaluated, and standards have not yet been developed, to apply them.

== Adoption ==
Approaches to GM food regulation vary by country, while substantial equivalence is generally the underlying principle of GM food safety assessment. This is the case for national and international agencies that include the Canadian Food Inspection Agency (CFIA), Japan's Ministry of Health, Labour and Welfare (MHLW), the US Food and Drug Administration (FDA), and the United Nations' Food and Agriculture Organization (FAO) and World Health Organization. In 1997, the European Union established a novel food assessment procedure whereby, once the producer has confirmed substantial equivalence with an existing food, government notification, with accompanying scientific evidence, is the only requirement for commercial release, however, foods containing genetically modified organisms (GMOs) are excluded and require mandatory authorization.

To establish substantial equivalence, the modified product is tested by the manufacturer for unexpected changes to a targeted set of components such as toxins, nutrients, or allergens, that are present in a similar unmodified food. The manufacturer's data is then assessed by a regulatory agency. If regulators determine that there is no significant difference between the modified and unmodified products, then there will generally be no further requirement for food safety testing. However, if the product has no natural equivalent, or shows significant differences from the unmodified food, or for other reasons that regulators may have (for instance, if a gene produces a protein that has not been a food component before), further safety testing may be required.

== See also ==
- GRAS - Generally Recognized As Safe, an FDA designation
