= Office of the Gene Technology Regulator =

Office of the Australian Government

The Office of the Gene Technology Regulator supports the Gene Technology Regulator, and is a part of the Australian Government Department of Health and Ageing. The Office was established under the Commonwealth Gene Technology Act 2000. This legislation sets forth a nationally consistent regulatory system for gene technology in Australia.
