= Timeline of Monsanto =

This is a timeline of Monsanto, a publicly traded American multinational agrochemical and agricultural biotechnology corporation headquartered in Creve Coeur, Greater St. Louis, Missouri.

== Big picture ==
Time period	Key developments at Monsanto
1901–1945	Monsanto is founded as a chemical company.
1945–1960	Monsanto begins producing agrochemicals.
1961–1982	Monsanto creates an agricultural division. It manufactures Agent Orange, which is later banned.
1982–2000	Monsanto starts its pivot into biotechnology. It genetically engineers a plant cell in 1982, commercializes the first genetically engineered product, recombinant bovine growth hormone (rbGH) - in 1994, and brings its first genetically engineered seeds, Roundup soybeans, onto the market in 1996. It pivots away from producing chemicals in the late 1990s.
2000–2016	Monsanto enters a merger and changes its name to Pharmacia. Pharmacia then spins off its agricultural division as an independent company named Monsanto Company. Monsanto continues in biotechnology.

== Full timeline ==
Year	Event type	Details
1901	Company	Monsanto is founded in St. Louis, Missouri, in 1901 as a chemical company, by John Francis Queeny, a 30‑year veteran of the pharmaceutical industry. Its first products are commodity food additives, like the artificial sweetener saccharin, caffeine, and vanillin.
1919	Expansion	Monsanto expands into Europe in 1919 by entering a partnership with Graesser's Chemical Works at Cefn Mawr, near Ruabon Wales, to produce vanillin, aspirin and its raw ingredient salicylic acid.
1929	Company	Monsanto's shares go on sale at the New York Stock Exchange.
1935	Acquisitions	Monsanto acquires the Swann Chemical Company in Anniston, Alabama, entering the business of producing PCBs on an industrial scale.
1936	Acquisitions	Monsanto acquires the Thomas & Hochwalt Laboratories in Dayton, Ohio, in order to acquire the expertise of Charles Allen Thomas and Dr. Carroll A. ("Ted") Hochwalt. The acquisition was subsequently made Monsanto's Central Research Department.
1940s (early)	Products	Monsanto becomes one of the world's leading manufacturers in both rubber and plastics (like polystyrene).
1944	Products	Monsanto begins manufacturing DDT.
1945	Products	Monsanto starts producing and markets agricultural chemicals, including 2,4-D. These eventually become what the company is known for.
1946	Products	Monsanto develops and markets the "All" laundry detergent until they sell the product line to Lever Brothers in 1957.
1952	Products	Monsanto (a major manufacturer of 2,4,5-T) informs the U.S. government that its 2,4,5-T is contaminated.
1961	Products	President Kennedy authorizes the use of the Rainbow Herbicide defoliants in the Vietnam War – many of which are manufactured by Monsanto. This includes Agent Orange, which is applied starting in 1965. These are used until 1971.
1960s (mid)	Products	William Standish Knowles and his team (at Monsanto) invent a way to selectively synthesize enantiomers via asymmetric hydrogenation. This was an important advancement because it was the first method for the catalytic production of pure chiral compounds.
1968	Products	Monsanto becomes the first company to start mass production of (visible) light emitting diodes (LEDs), using gallium arsenide phosphide, ushering in the era of solid-state lights. Monsanto was a pioneer of optoelectronics in the 1970s.
1970	Legal	The United States Department of Agriculture halts the use of 2,4,5-T (manufactured by Monsanto) on all food crops except rice.
1972	Products	DDT is banned under most circumstances.
1974	Products	Harvard University and Monsanto sign a ten-year industrial-funded research grant to support the cancer research of Judah Folkman.
1974	Products	Monsanto puts up Roundup, or glyphosate, on the market. Glyphosate becomes one of the most commonly used herbicides.
1977	Products	Monsanto stops producing Polychlorinated biphenyls.
1979	Products	Monsanto strikes a deal with Genentech in 1979 to license Genentech's patents and collaborate on development of a recombinant version of Bovine somatotropin.
1980	Legal	The first US Agent Orange class-action lawsuit us filed for the injuries military personnel in Vietnam suffered through exposure to dioxin in the defoliant. The suit is settled in 1984, with slightly over 45% of the sum paid by Monsanto alone.
1983	Products	Monsanto is one of four groups announcing the introduction of genes into plants in 1983.
1984	Legal	The trial of Kemner vs. Monsanto (one of the Monsanto legal cases) opens in Illinois. The case involved a group of plaintiffs who claimed to have been poisoned by dioxins in 1979 when a train derailed in Sturgeon, Missouri. Tank cars on the train carried a chemical used to make wood preservatives and "small quantities of a dioxin called 2, 3, 7, 8, TCDD... formed as a part of the manufacturing process."
1985	Acquisitions	Monsanto purchases G. D. Searle & Company for $2.7 billion in cash.
1986	Products	Monsanto sells its American-based commodity plastics, or polystyrene, business to Polysar Ltd., a Canadian petrochemical company.
1993	Products	Monsanto's Searle division files a patent application for Celebrex.
1994	Products	Monsanto introduces a recombinant version of bovine somatotropin, brand-named Posilac.
1995	Products	Monsanto's potato plants producing Bt toxin (genetically modified to make a crystalline insecticidal protein from Bacillus thuringiensis) are approved for sale by the Environmental Protection Agency, after having approved by the U.S. FDA, making it the first pesticide-producing genetically modified crop to be approved in the United States.
1996	Products	Monsanto introduces genetically modified Roundup Ready soybeans that are resistant to Roundup (greatly improving a farmer's ability to control weeds, since glyphosate could be sprayed in the fields without harming their crops).
1996	Acquisitions	Monsanto acquires Agracetus, the biotechnology company that had generated the first transgenic varieties of cotton, soybeans, peanuts, and other crops, and from which Monsanto had been licensing technology since 1991.
1997	Divisions	Monsanto spins off its industrial chemical and fiber divisions into Solutia. This marks the beginning of its pivot from chemical businesses into biotechnology.
1998	Products	Monsanto introduces genetically modified Roundup Ready corn that is resistant to Roundup.
1999	Corporation	Monsanto merges with Pharmacia and Upjohn, so the agricultural division became a wholly owned subsidiary of the "new" Pharmacia.
2000	Corporation	Pharmacia spins off its Monsanto subsidiary into a new company, the "new Monsanto" - which then raises $700 million in a new IPO. The "new Monsanto" is legally distinct from the old pre-2000 Monsanto.
2000	Competition	Syngenta is formed in 2000 by the merger of Novartis Agribusiness and Zeneca Agrochemicals. By 2009, it ranks third in seeds and biotechnology sales.
2007	Acquisitions	Monsanto purchases Delta & Pine Land Company, a major cotton seed breeder, for $1.5 billion. As a condition for approval from the Department of Justice, Monsanto was obligated to divest its Stoneville cotton business, which it sold to Bayer, and to divest its NexGen cotton business, which it sold to Americot. Monsanto also exited the pig breeding business by selling Monsanto Choice Genetics to Newsham Genetics LC in November, divesting itself of "any and all swine-related patents, patent applications, and all other intellectual property".
2013	Acquisitions	Monsanto purchases the San Francisco-based Climate Corporation for $930 million. Climate Corporation makes more accurate local weather forecasts for farmers based on data modeling and historical data; if the forecasts were wrong, the farmer was recompensed.
2013	Public	The March Against Monsanto, a worldwide protest against Monsanto and GMOs takes place.
2015	Products	Monsanto rolls out seeds engineered with new herbicide resistance, releasing dicamba-resistant cotton.
2016	Acquisitions	Bayer acquires Monsanto for 63 billion dollars.
2016	Products	Monsanto buys a license from Broad Institute of Harvard University and MIT to use the CRISPR/Cas9 gene-editing technology.
