= Agriculture in Puerto Rico =

Primary sector of the economy of Puerto Rico

The agriculture industry in Puerto Rico constitutes over $800 million or about 0.69% of the island's gross domestic product (GDP) in 2020. Currently the sector accounts for 15% of the food consumed locally. Experts from the University of Puerto Rico argued that these crops could cover approximately 30% of the local demand, particularly that of smaller vegetables such as tomatoes, lettuce, etc. and several kinds of tubers that are currently being imported. The existence of a thriving agricultural economy has been prevented due to a shift in priorities towards industrialization, bureaucratization, mismanagement of terrains, lack of alternative methods and a deficient workforce. Its geographical location within the Caribbean exacerbates these issues, making the scarce existing crops propense to the devastating effects of Atlantic hurricanes.

== History ==
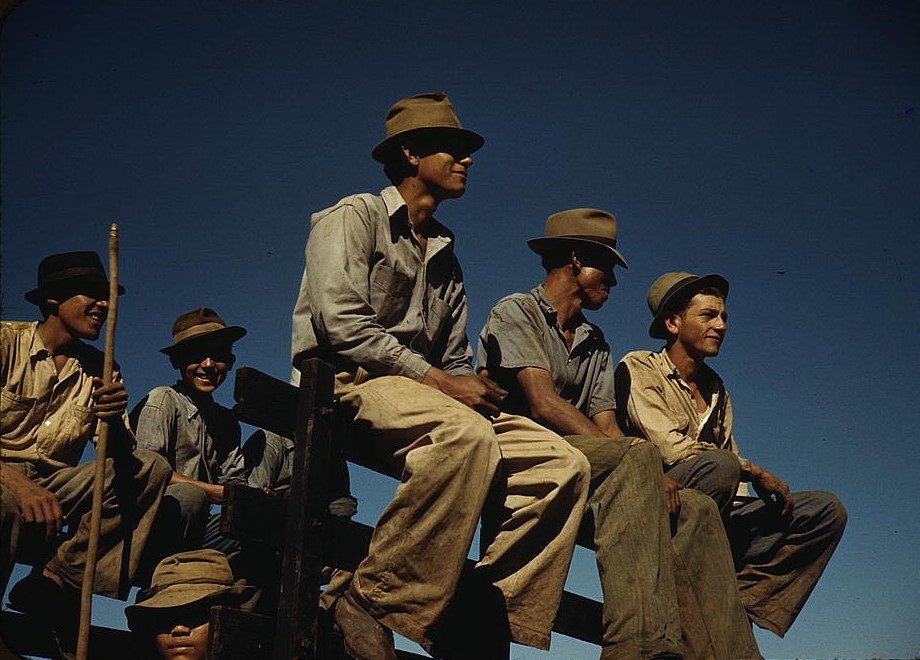
Sugar cane workers resting at the noon hour, Río Piedras. Photograph by Jack Delano, a photographer for the Farm Security Administration. Ca. 1941.

Agriculture or farming is concerned with the cultivation of plants, animals and other food sources that sustain life. It also involves growing crops for other purposes. Coffee and sugar cane production in Puerto Rico has had a history of ups and downs, affected by hurricanes and by its isolated location, and its political status as a colony of Spain and of the United States.

In 1900, the most important agricultural products in Puerto Rico were "cotton, rice, cacao, corn, coconuts, pepper, bananas, tobacco, vegetable dyes, coffee, sugar, pineapples and vanilla".

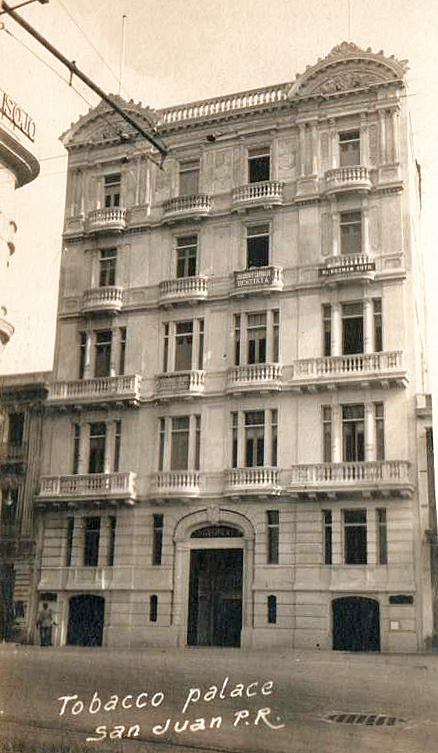
Tobacco Palace in San Juan in 1917

The impact in August 1899 of two hurricanes severely affected the island. The 1899 San Ciriaco hurricane on August 8, and an unnamed hurricane on August 22 killed approximately 3,400 people and left thousands without shelter, food, or work. The hurricanes cost the economy millions of dollars due to the destruction of the majority of the sugar and coffee plantations. Afterwards, nearly 5‚000 Puerto Ricans migrated to Hawaii by 1910 to work in the sugar plantations of said state.

In the 1940s and 1950s agriculture continued to play a crucial role in the island's economy with 45% of the labor force employed within the sector in 1940. The cultivation of pineapples was significant until the 1990s when the main buyer Lotus juice company closed.

In 2012, there were 13,159 farms in Puerto Rico. While not a state, Puerto Rico is a member of the Southern United States Trade Association, a non-profit organization that assists the agriculture industry in developing its exports. In early 2020, farm owners in Ponce reported on the continuing challenge of finding laborers.

== New farms ==
As a result of the 2009 economic crisis and the susceptibility of Puerto Rico to hurricanes, there's been an urgency to push for more farms on the island. While not large enough to produce on a mass scale, the quality of products is high. Farming has a more positive image among young people in Puerto Rico, however, in places like Ponce, where the weather tends to be hotter, farm owners complain that the turnover rate is too high.

In September 2019, an initiative to diminish the amount of coffee that is imported to Puerto Rico was announced by the Hispanic Federation, leading 1,500 Puerto Rico coffee growers.

== Crops ==
Corn (maize) is commonly grown here, including strains of Bt corn producing the Cry1F endotoxin. This has produced extensive Cry1F resistance. One important pest this protects against is the Fall Armyworm (FAW, Spodoptera frugiperda), including Cry1F-resistant FAW. In 2007 Cry1F resistance in FAW was confirmed here and Dow and Pioneer withdrew their Cry1F corn – Herculex I, released in 2003 – from use here. Nonetheless as of 2018 other Cry1F corns are still commonly grown here.

By contrast Storer et al., 2012 notes no such resistance from the mainland of the United States (up to their publication), showing a lack of movement of FAW from here to there. Then in 2014 Huang et al. found alleles that are shared with FAW populations on the US mainland. Due to this history of detections, migration from PR is probably the source of Cry1F-resistance FAW there and not the other way around. On the other hand Banerjee et al., 2017 finds Cry1F-r in Puerto Rico is commonly caused by a particular mutation in SfABCC2, the resistance allele SfABCC2mut. SfABCC2 is the FAW version of multidrug resistance-associated protein 2 (ATP Binding Cassette subfamily C2, ABCC2). They did not find a single such allele in Florida in 2012, 2014, or 2016. These very disparate prevalences fail to support any substantial immigration of FAW from PR to Florida, contrary to earlier studies including Huang above.

The use of two or more effective Cry proteins may be necessary to provide multiple modes of action for resistance management.

Both the Fall Armyworm C-strain and -R-strain are found here, and are shared with Louisiana. These strains were first discovered by Pashley 1986 via a genetic analysis of the PR and La populations, showing segregation on host preference. Both have since been found elsewhere around the world.

== Gallery ==
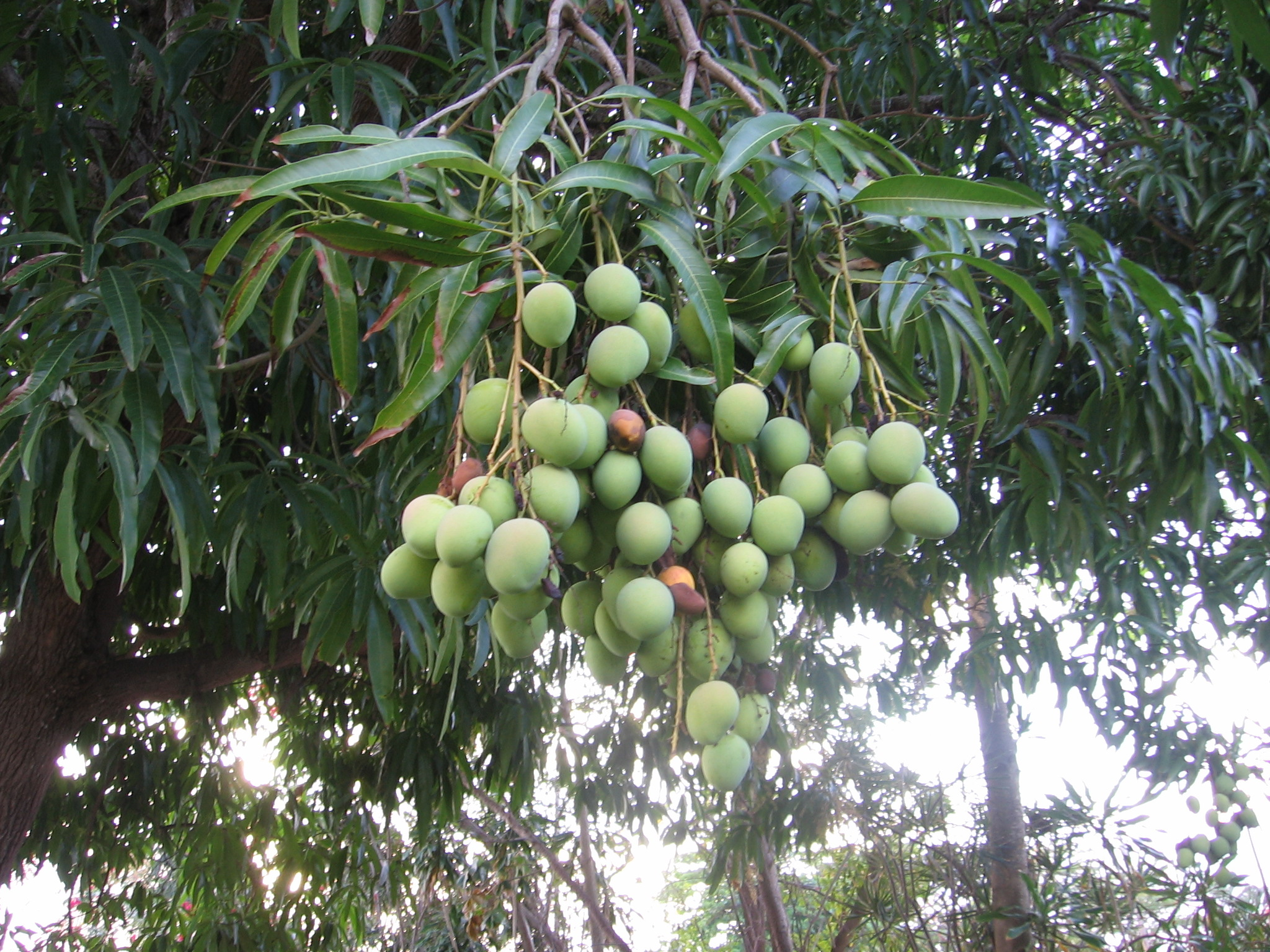
Mango tree in Rincón

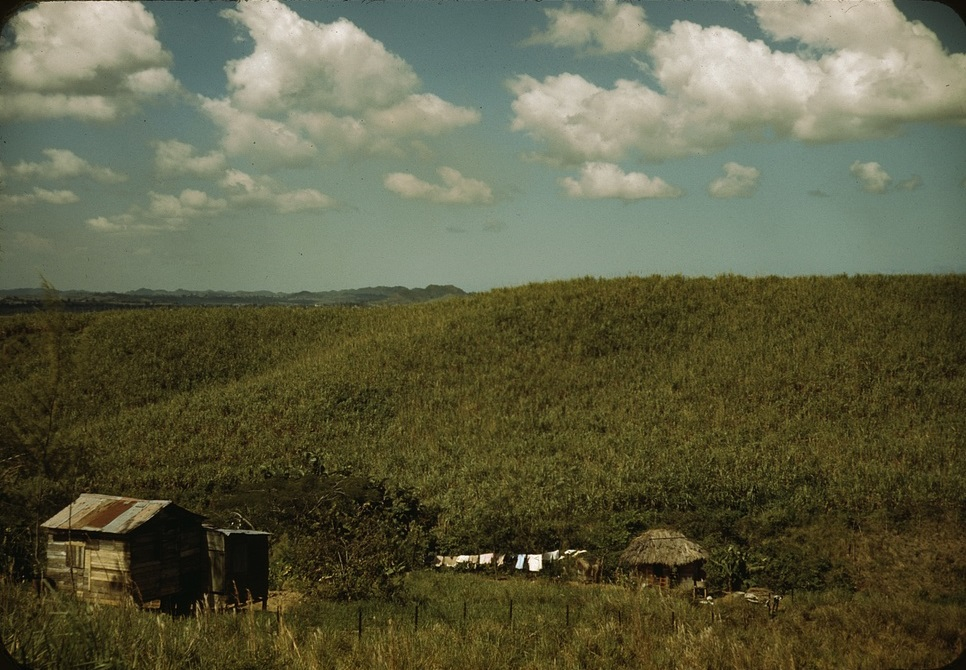
In 1941 sugar cane production surged in Río Piedras, now a district of San Juan

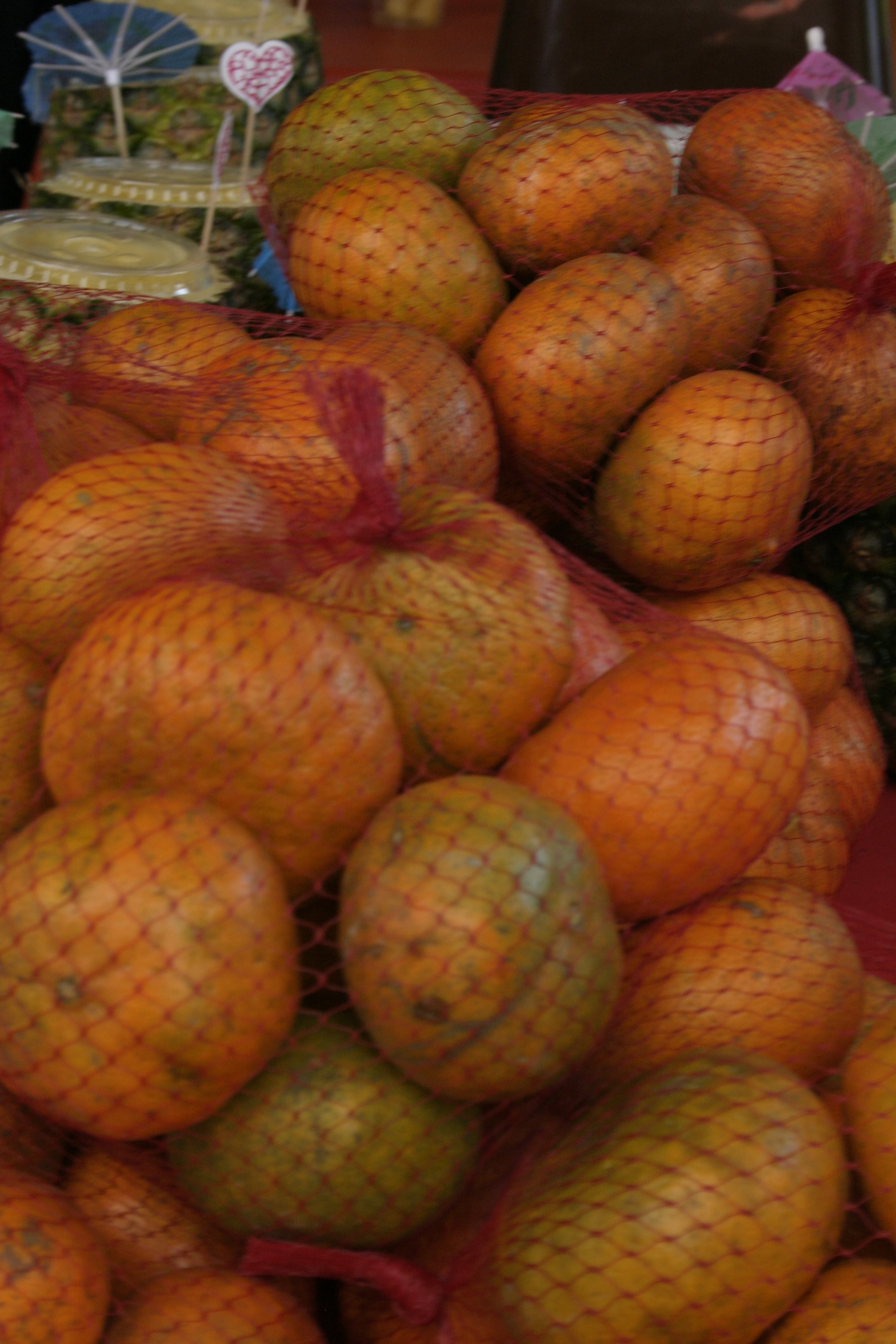
Oranges at festival in Maricao

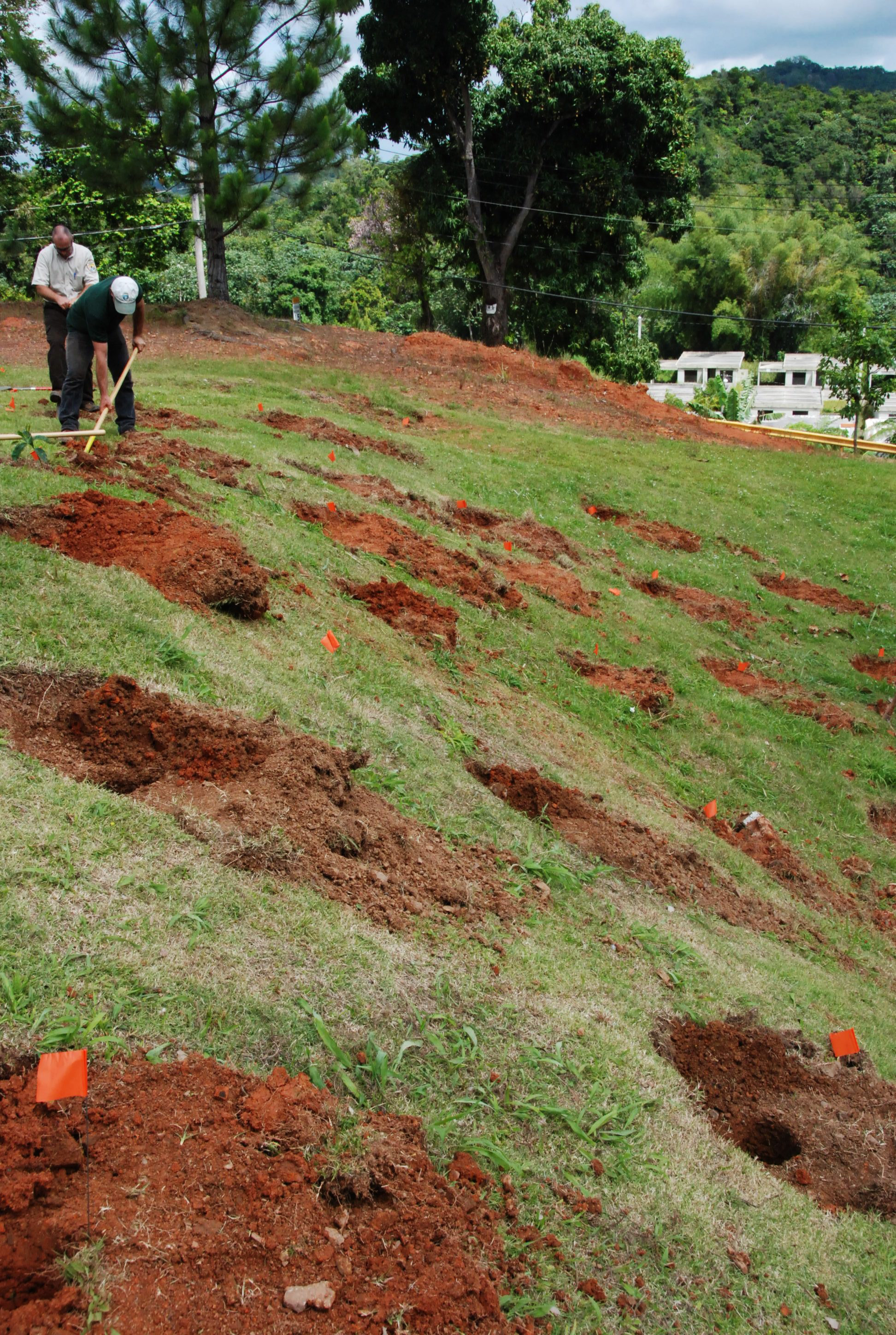
Preparing to plant in Maricao

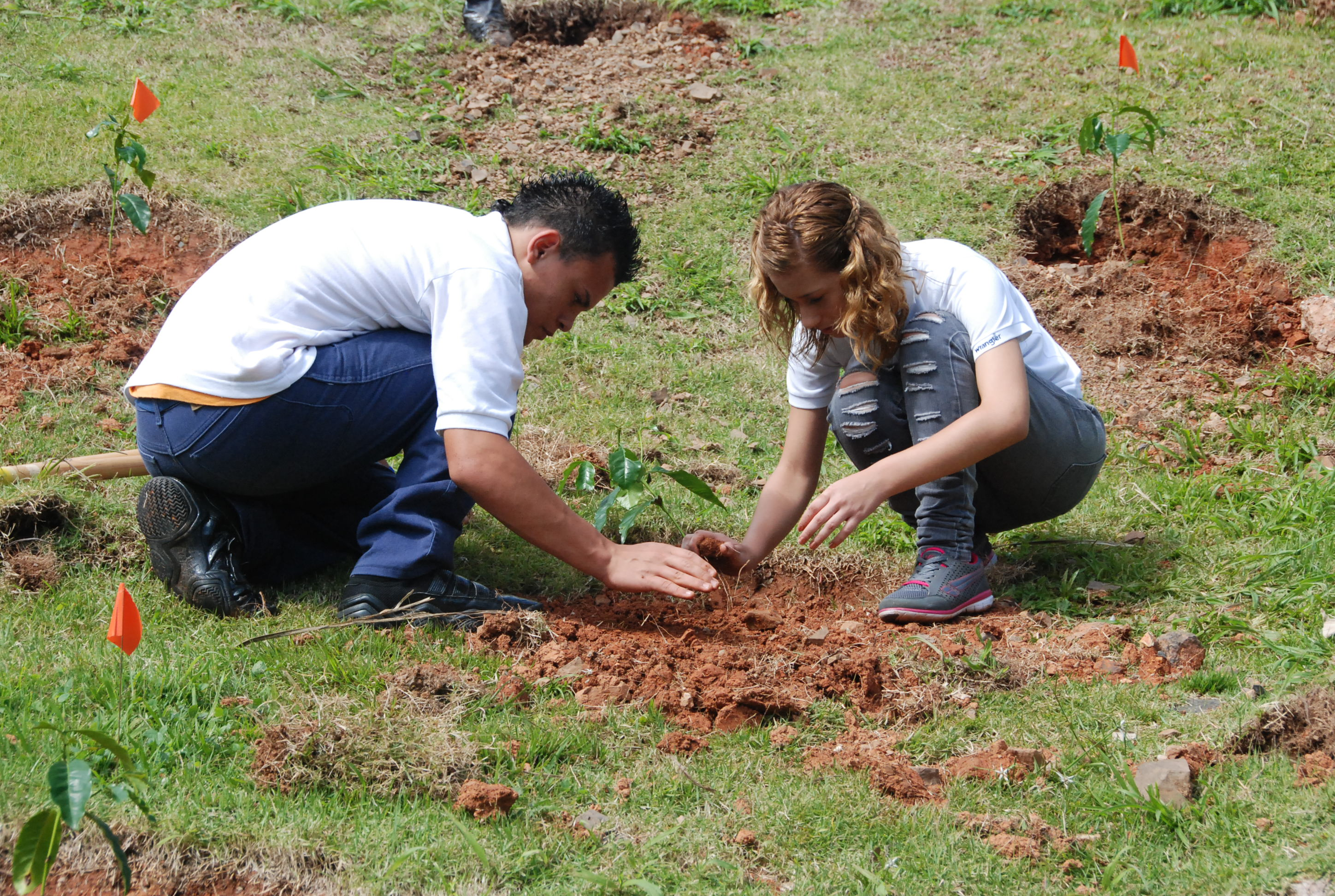
Students plant a tree at a school in Maricao

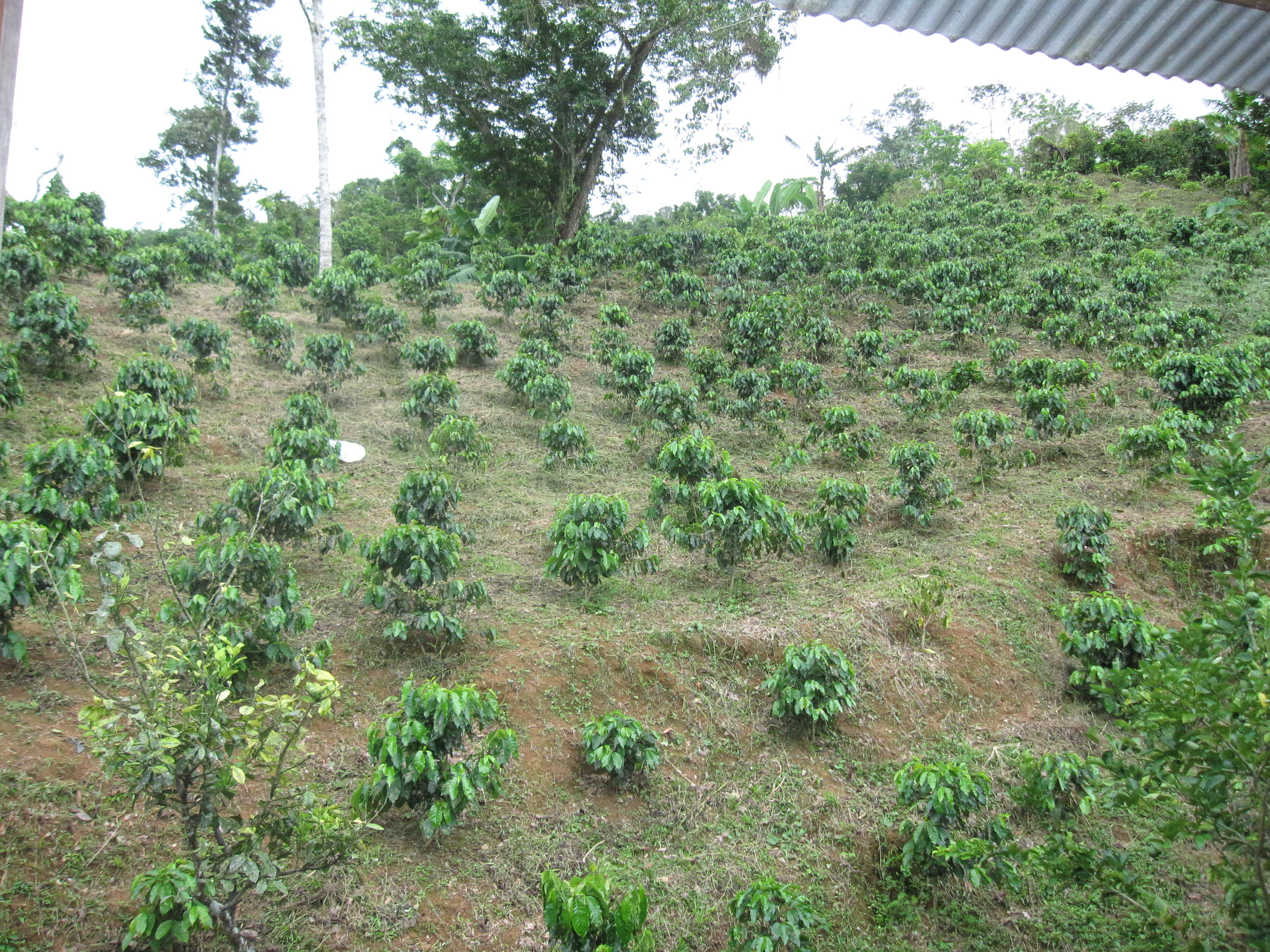
Newly planted coffee trees at Hacienda Lealtad in Lares after Hurricane Maria in 2017 destroyed all its coffee trees

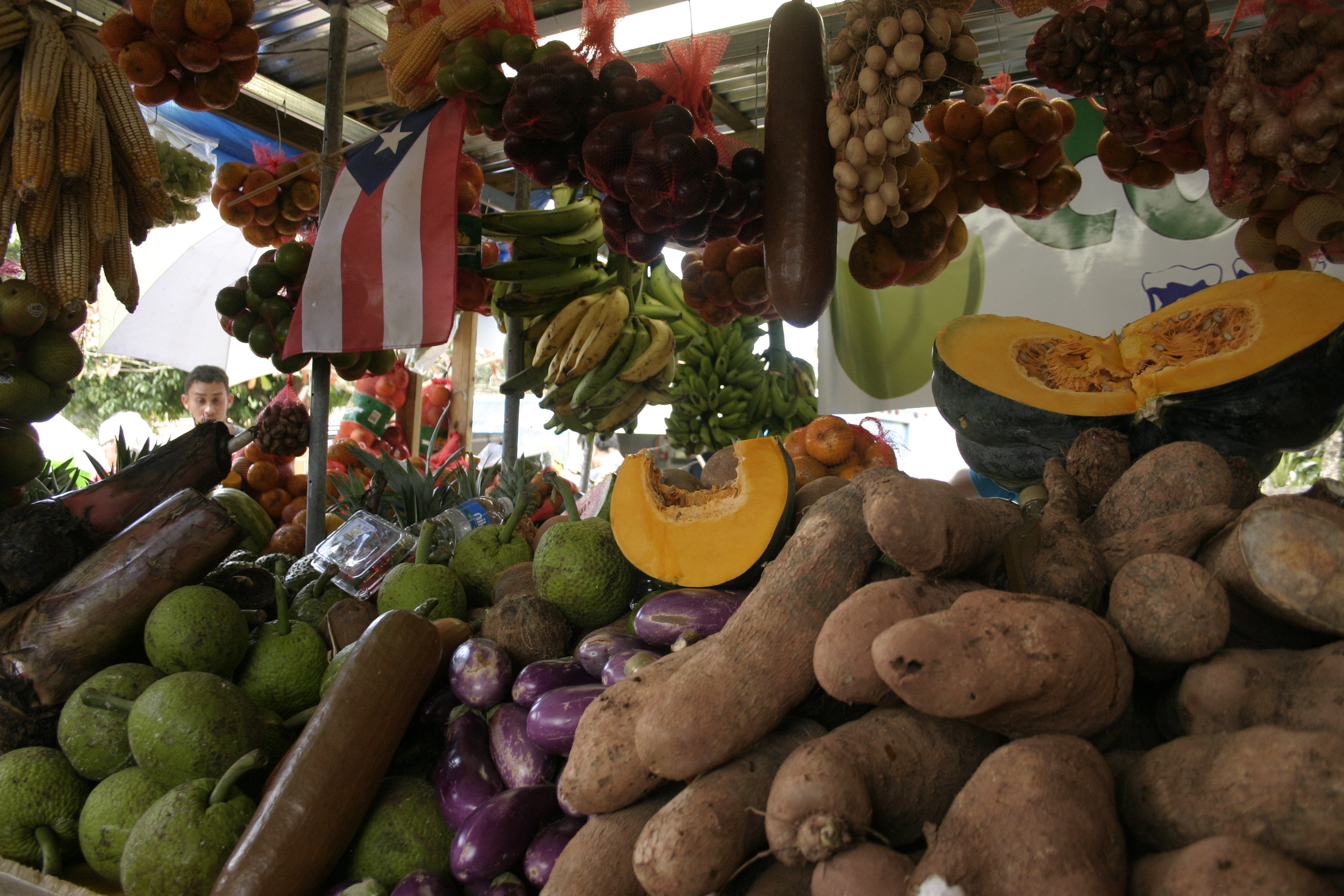
Vegetable and fruit stand at Fiesta Acabe del Café in Maricao in 2014

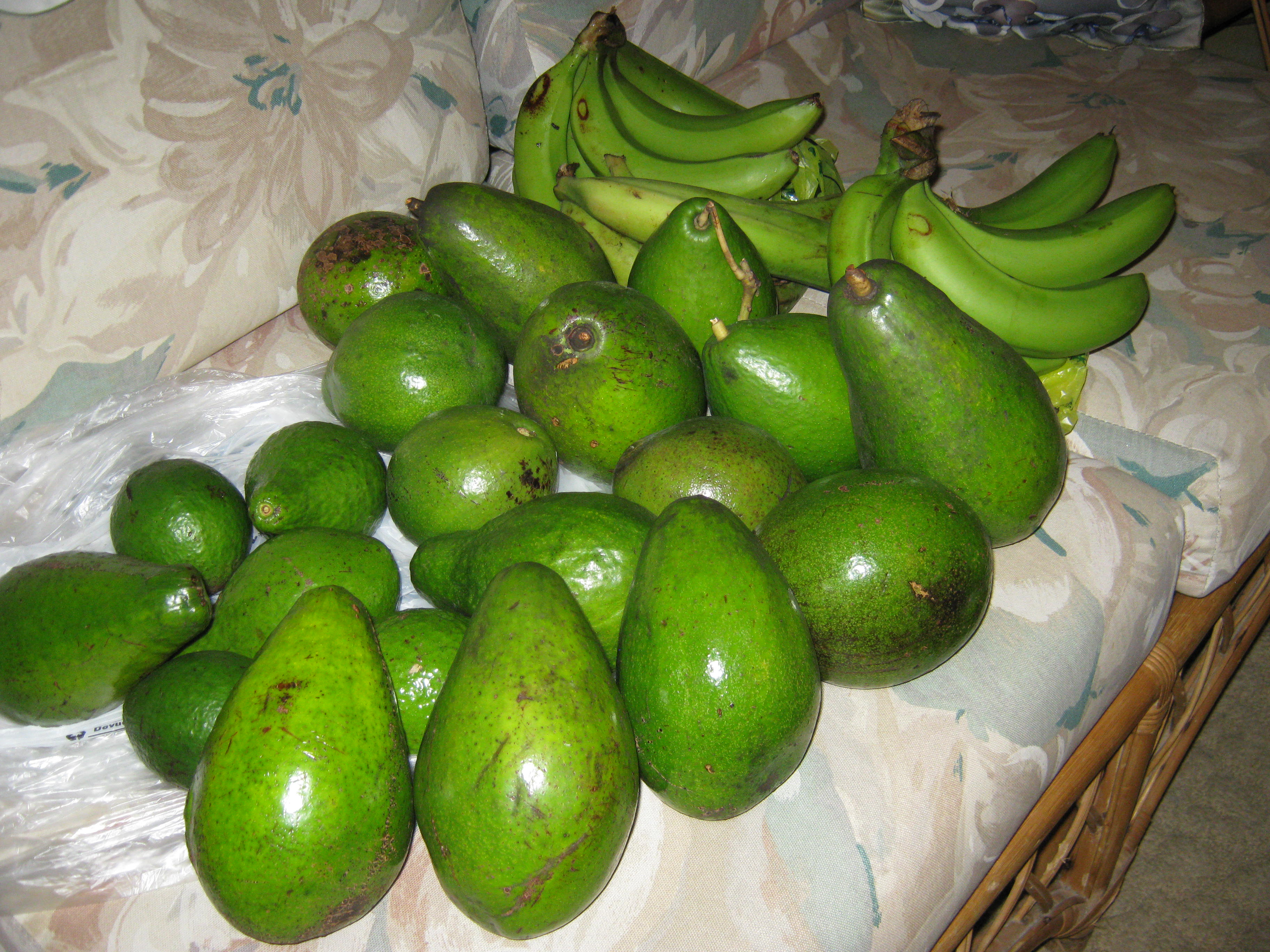
Avocado harvest in Cayey

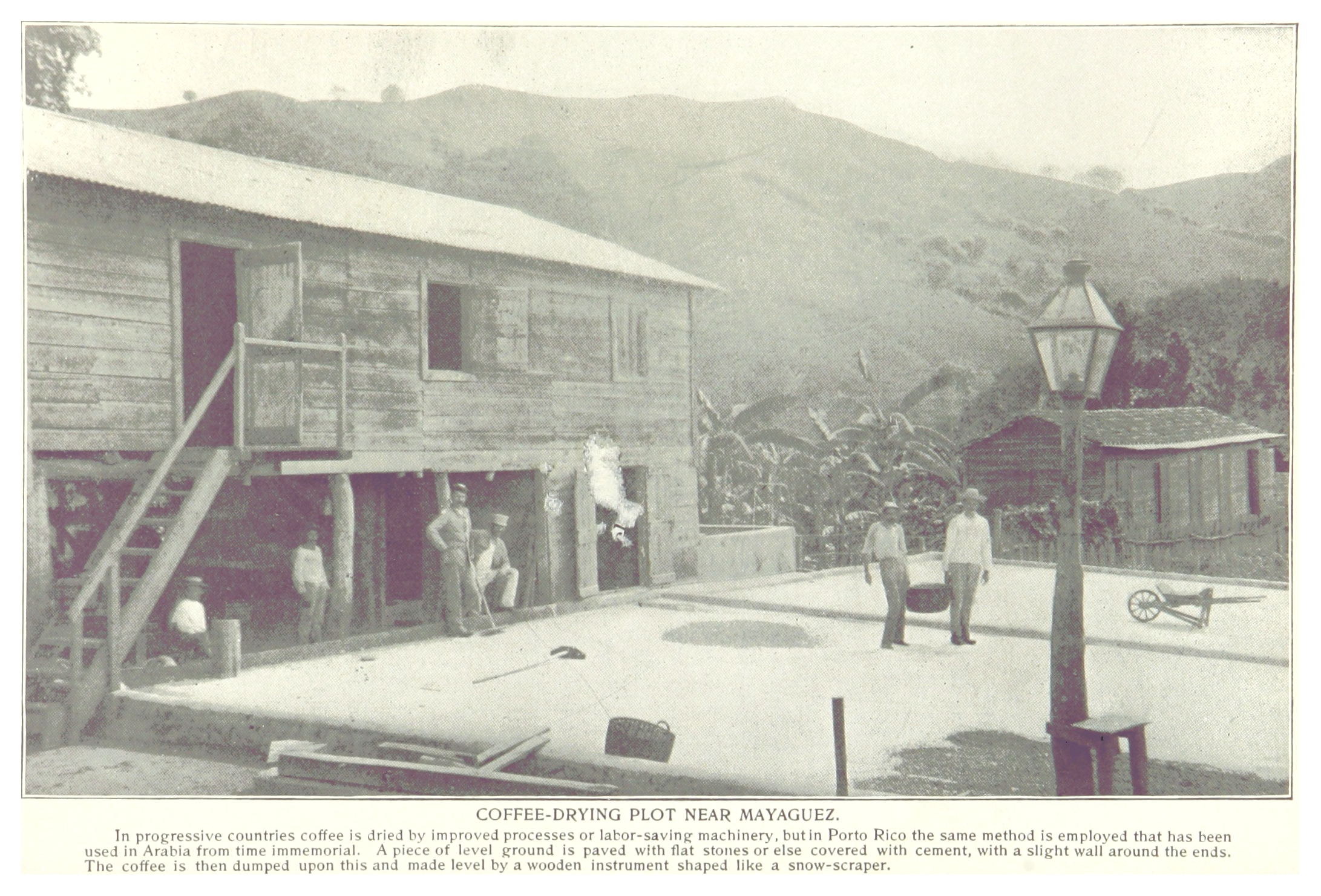
Coffee near Mayagüez in 1899

== See also ==
- Politics of Puerto Rico
- Coffee production in Puerto Rico
