= Fox Paine & Company =

American private equity firm

Fox Paine & Company, LLC
- Type: Private Ownership
- Industry: Private Equity
- Founded: 1996; 30 years ago
- Founder: Saul A. Fox
- Headquarters: Woodside, California, United States
- Total assets: $1.5 billion
- Website: www.foxpaine.com

Fox Paine & Company is a private equity firm focused on leveraged buyout transactions. Fox Paine & Company, LLC was founded in 1996 by former Kohlberg Kravis Roberts partner Saul A. Fox. Former Kohlberg & Co. partner W. Dexter Paine III was brought on as Fox's Partner in 1997. In December 2007, after several months of litigation, the partners separated, with Saul Fox retaining the firm's name, while Dexter Paine formed a new firm, Paine & Partners, with the legacy Fox Paine investment team.

The firm invests in specialized property and casualty insurance, software, semiconductors, agribusiness, healthcare, energy, telecommunications, industrials, consumer personal care products, and medical diagnostic equipment.

Fox Paine, originally based in Foster City, California, is currently headquartered in Woodside, California.

== History ==
Prior to founding Fox Paine, Saul Fox had been a tax attorney at Latham & Watkins and, later, a partner at Kohlberg Kravis Roberts. In November 1996, after 12 years at KKR, Fox decided to open his own shop. He formed Fox Capital, Inc., a Nevada-based corporation which would do business in California under the name "Saul Fox & Company, Inc." Fox hired consultants to assist him in his new venture. These consultants encouraged Fox to take on a partner because they believed investors would be eager to invest in a two-man shop where the partners brought complementary skills to the table. This led to Fox's hiring of Dexter Paine in 1997 to be his equal partner in what would become Fox Paine & Company, LLC. Paine had been an investment banker and private equity investor at Bankers Trust, followed by San Francisco-based Robertson Stephens and, later, Kohlberg & Co. The two partners had worked together on past business deals, and had kept in touch over the years. In 1985, while Paine was at Bankers Trust and Fox was at KKR, Paine had helped Fox arrange financing for the leveraged buyout of Motel 6, which had turned out to be a profitable deal.

In April 1998, Fox Paine completed fundraising for Fox Paine Capital Fund, also known as "Fund I", an investment fund with $500 million of investor commitments. By October 1999, Fund I was fully invested, with seven acquisitions. The following is a list of the portfolio companies which comprised Fund I, along with the date the firm exited each respective investment (if available):

- ACMI Corporation (June 2005)
- Alaska Communications, formerly Alaska Communications System (March 2006)
- Byram Healthcare (February 2008 - sold by Paine & Partners, not Fox Paine)
- Maxxim Medical (September 2003 - company had filed for Chapter 11 bankruptcy protection)
- United American Energy Corp. (October 2003)
- WJ Communications (March 2008 - sold by Paine & Partners, not Fox Paine)

In 2000, the firm began raising Fox Paine Capital Fund II, or "Fund II". This second investment fund had an original target of $750 million. However, by early 2001, Fox Paine had succeeded in raising $1 billion for the fund. Fund II proved wildly successful, producing an internal rate of return (IRR) of 30.7%, according to one of the fund's limited partners. Fund II included the following acquisitions (exit date included if applicable/available):

- Advanta (a European agronomic seed company - not the financial-services company of the same name) (February 2006)
- Erno Laszlo (February 2011)
- L'Artisan Parfumeur (January 2015)
- Paradigm B.V. (August 2012)
- Penhaligon's (January 2015)
- Seminis (January 2005)
- United America Indemnity, Ltd. (now known as Global Indemnity Group, LLC) (acquired in September 2003)
- VCST Industrial Products (January 2006)

Through these investments, Fox Paine became one of the West Coast's most successful private-equity firms, known for its "deal-making ingenuity in finding profitable approaches to situations that other private-equity firms wouldn't touch."

In 2005, the two partners disagreed about the raising of a third investment fund. Paine pushed the effort, but Fox preferred to focus on managing the firm's existing portfolio companies to maximize value for investors. In February 2006, they reached an agreement, known as the Newco Agreement, that let Paine launch what became known as Fox Paine Capital Fund III, or "Fund III". "Newco" was the name of the management company Paine formed to manage Fund III. Under the terms of the Newco Agreement, Fox would remain CEO of Fox Paine & Company, and Paine would receive a conditional license to use the Fox Paine name, track record, and certain of the firm's office resources to run Fund III. In addition, Fox Paine and Newco were to share employees, but Newco was to hire its own CFO and dedicated accountant. Fox had no active involvement in the fund, but did contribute $5 million in return for a 25% stake in the fund's general partnership. Newco eventually changed its name to Fox Paine Management III.

Soon after the signing of the Newco Agreement, the partners' relationship began to deteriorate. By August 2007, the situation had soured to such a degree that the partners resorted to litigation to settle a number of disputes. Despite the provision in the Newco Agreement that Fox Paine Management III was to hire its own CFO and dedicated accountant, in early 2006 Paine recruited Fox Paine's CFO, Amy Ghisletta, to work for Fund III. On August 1, 2006, Ghisletta sent a memo to all Fox Paine employees, informing them that they were being transferred to the Fund III payroll. Fox protested that this "raiding" of Fox Paine employees curtailed his ability to manage Fox Paine's existing investments. Paine claimed that the employee transfer was done at Fox's request. Later, in August 2007, Fox attempted to hire his own CFO, but Paine argued that such a hiring should be made jointly. Fox also accused Paine of trying to sell three Fox Paine portfolio companies behind his back; Paine denied any wrongdoing. Eventually, on August 27, 2007, Fox sued Paine in Delaware Chancery Court for breach of contract, breach of fiduciary duty, unjust enrichment, and misappropriation of company assets. Paine countersued, claiming that Fox was "semiretired" and had "checked out" of the partnership. Both partners asked the court to "rein in" the other's ability to control the firm.

In December 2007, Fox and Paine reached an out-of-court settlement under which Fox retained the use of the Fox Paine name and control over the investments in Fox Paine Fund II, and ceded his interest in Fox Paine Fund III, as well as his remaining legacy interest in Fox Paine Fund I, to Paine. In return, Paine ceded his entire interest in Fund II to Fox. After the settlement, Paine, along with the majority of the Fox Paine legacy investment team, departed Fox Paine & Company to focus their full energy on Paine's venture, Fox Paine Management III. Pursuant to the terms of the settlement agreement, Paine could no longer use the Fox Paine name so, in early 2008, he changed the name of his firm to Paine & Partners (which eventually became Paine Schwartz Partners). Although the two firms continued to share office space, they were not affiliated in any way.

Although the December 2007 settlement was intended to effect a complete separation between Fox and Paine, in early 2008 new disputes arose between the former partners. This led to over four years of further litigation, as well as arbitrations. In August 2012, the former partners finally reached a definitive out-of-court settlement.

Since that time, Fox Paine has focused on maximizing the value of, and then selling, its remaining Fund II investments. In August 2020, Global Indemnity Group, LLC, the last remaining Fox Paine investment, successfully completed re-domestication to the U.S.
