= Seminis =

American seed developer and marketer

Seminis, Inc.
- Type: Subsidiary
- Founded: 1994
- Headquarters: St. Louis, Missouri, U.S.
- Revenue: US$ 606 million (2007)
- Number of employees: 3,000 (2007, approximate)
- Parent: Bayer AG
- Website: www.vegetables.bayer.com/us/en-us/products/seminis.html

Seminis is a developer, grower, and marketer of fruit and vegetable seeds, currently a subsidiary of Bayer. Seminis' hybrids claim to improve nutrition, boost crop yields, limit spoilage and reduce the need for chemicals. Their retail line includes over 3,500 seed varieties.

== History ==
Seminis was established in 1994 by Alfonso Romo under his Savia Group, a part of the Empresas La Moderna S.A. conglomerate, to consolidate leading companies in the fragmented fruit and vegetable seed industry. The goal was realized by takeovers of several companies, including Asgrow, Petoseed, Royal Sluis, Bruinsma Seeds, and Genecorp.

In 1996, Romo sold the field crop business of Seminis to Monsanto for $240 million.

In 1999, Savia took Seminis public, in which Savia retained control of the company.

In September 2003, Savia took Seminis off the public markets for approximately $650 million via an investment of approximately $222 million from Fox Paine & Company and additional cash and stock from Savia and related entities.

On March 23, 2005, the Monsanto Company announced that it had completed its acquisition of Seminis. Monsanto paid $1 billion in cash and $400 million assumed debt, plus a performance-based payment of up to $125 million payable by 2007.

In 2018, Bayer acquired Monsanto and all of its seed brands, including Seminis.
