= Critical Reviews in Toxicology =

- Discipline: Toxicology
- Language: English
- Edited by: Roger O. McClellan

Publication details
- Former name: CRC Critical Reviews in Toxicology
- History: 1971–present
- Publisher: Taylor and Francis
- Frequency: 10/year
- Impact factor: 5.313 (2017)

Standard abbreviations
- ISO 4: Crit. Rev. Toxicol.

Indexing
- CODEN: CRTXB2
- ISSN: 1040-8444 (print); 1547-6898 (web)
- LCCN: 85642864
- OCLC no.: 613067672

Links
- Journal homepage; Online access; Online archive

Critical Reviews in Toxicology is a peer-reviewed medical journal that publishes review articles on all aspects of toxicology. It is published by Taylor & Francis and the editor-in-chief is Roger O. McClellan. It was established in 1971 as CRC Critical Reviews in Toxicology, obtaining its current name in 1980.

== Conflicts of interest ==
The journal has been accused by critics of being a "broker of junk science", according to the Center for Public Integrity. Monsanto was found to have worked with an outside consulting firm to induce the journal to publish a biased review of the health effects of its product "Roundup".

== Abstracting and indexing ==
The journal is abstracted and indexed in:

- BIOSIS Previews
- CAB Abstracts
- Chemical Abstracts
- Current Contents/Life Sciences
- Elsevier BIOBASE
- Embase
- EMBiology
- Index Medicus/MEDLINE/PubMed
- PASCAL
- Science Citation Index
- Scopus

According to the Journal Citation Reports, the journal has a 2017 impact factor of 5.313. As of 2024, the impact factor is 5.7.
