= Alaska Communications =

American telecommunications company

- Company type: Subsidiary
- Industry: Telecommunications
- Founded: 1998; 28 years ago, Anchorage, Alaska
- Headquarters: Anchorage, Alaska
- Key people: Matthew McConnell (president and CEO)
- Products: Fixed telephony; Broadband
- Parent: ATN International
- Website: alaskacommunications.com

Alaska Communications (formerly Alaska Communications Systems or ACS) is a telecommunications corporation headquartered in Anchorage, Alaska. It was the first telecommunications provider in the state of Alaska to maintain a third-generation wireless network and the only provider in Alaska that owned fully incorporated infrastructure for the major telecommunications platforms; wireless communications, Internet networking, and local and long-distance phone service. Alaska Communications wireline operations include advanced data networks and an underwater fiber optic system. The Alaska Communications wireless operations included a statewide 3G CDMA network, and coverage extended from the North Slope to Southeast Alaska.

== History ==
The company was formed in 1998, when CenturyTel announced the sale of its Alaska operations (newly acquired from PacifiCorp) to local management and Fox Paine & Company. In 1999, Alaska Communications acquired Anchorage Telephone Utility from the Municipality of Anchorage.

On February 3, 2014, Alaska Communications announced its purchase of TekMate.

On December 4, 2014, GCI Wireless agreed to purchase the wireless assets of Alaska Communications for $300 million. The deal was completed in the first quarter of 2015.

In July 2021, Alaska Communications was acquired by the Nasdaq-listed company ATN International Inc. for $343 million.

== Current Projects ==
On May 25, 2017, Alaska Communications announced it will be offering Internet services via OneWeb.

Alaska Communications has an agreement with Quintillion to use its submarine fiber optic cable to bring new services to some of Alaska's northernmost communities: Utqiaġvik, Nome, Kotzebue, Point Hope and Wainwright.

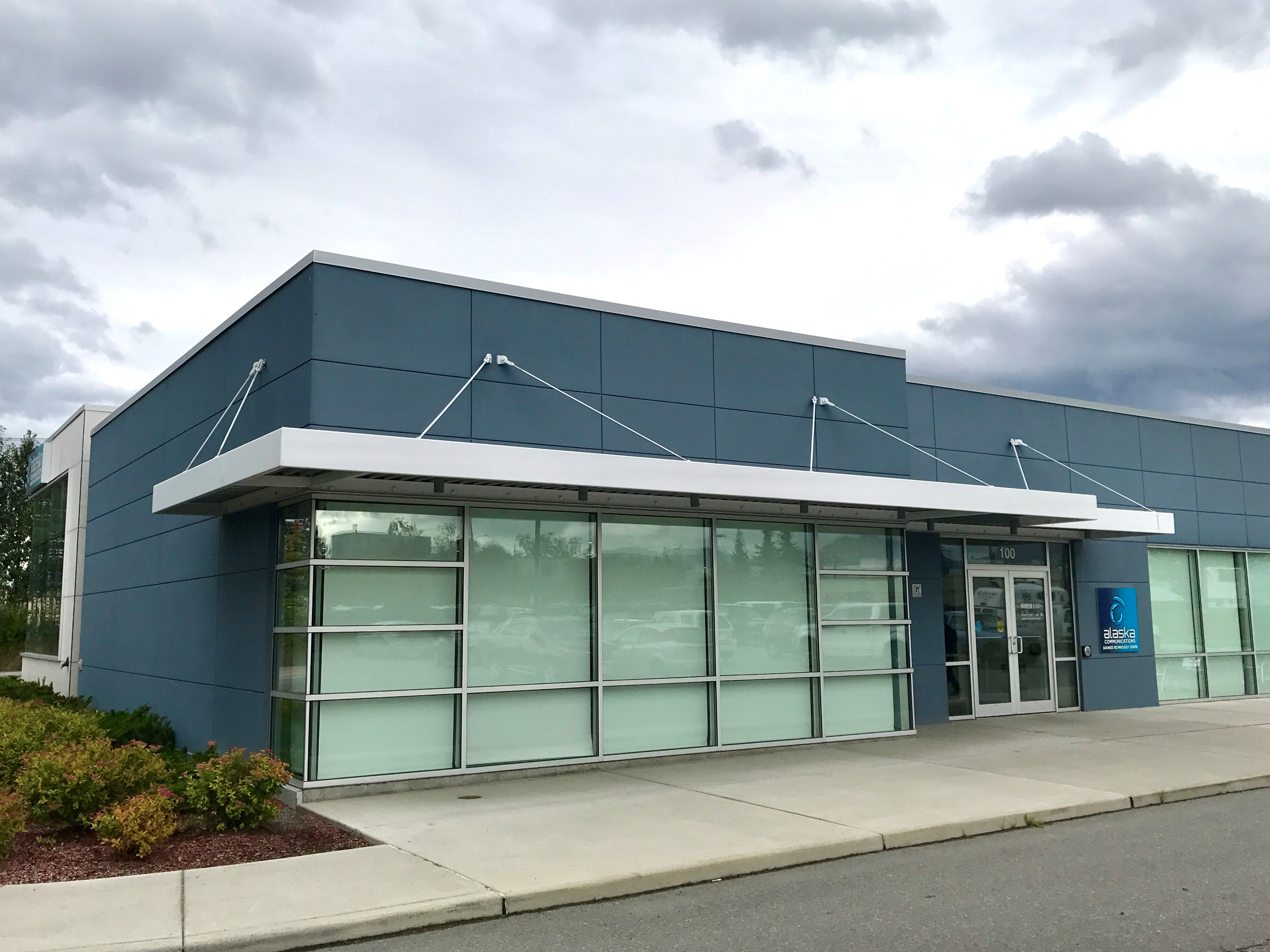
Business Technology Center located in Anchorage, Alaska.

== Community work ==
Alaska Communications supports United Way, Junior Achievement, the University of Alaska, 90% by 2020, and FIRST in Alaska. It also partners with Boys and Girls Clubs of Southcentral Alaska to put on Summer of Heroes, a program which awards scholarships to youth who are engaged in community service.
