= Michael R. Taylor =

American politician

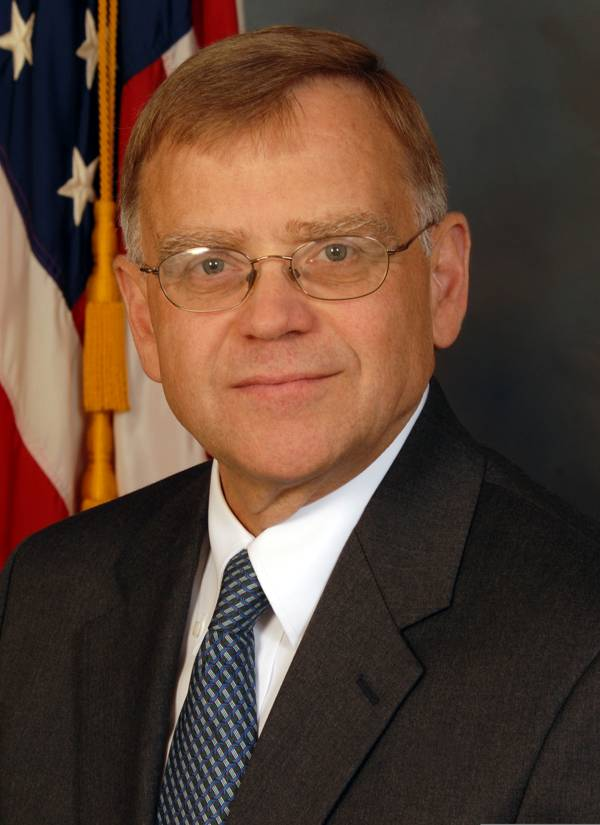
- Michael R. Taylor in 2009
- Occupations: Deputy Commissioner for Foods, Food and Drug Administration

Michael R. Taylor is an American lawyer who has played leadership roles in the US Food and Drug Administration, agrochemical company Monsanto, and law firm King & Spalding. He currently co-chairs the board of STOP Foodborne Illness, a non-profit that supports victims of serious illness and their families in efforts to strengthen food safety culture and practices in government and industry.

== Early career and law practice ==
Taylor received a B.A. degree in political science from Davidson College in 1971 and served on active duty in the US Army as an officer in the Military Police Corps from 1971 to 1973, stationed at the Presidio in San Francisco. He received a J.D. degree from the University of Virginia in 1976 and was employed as a staff attorney at the FDA from 1976 to 1980, where he worked on enforcement litigation, medical device regulations, food safety and food labeling. He served during 1980 as executive assistant to the FDA Commissioner Dr. Jere Goyan.

From 1981 to 1991 Taylor worked in private law practice at King & Spalding. He established and led the firm's food and drug practice and became the firm's first food and drug partner in 1984. During this period, Mr. Taylor wrote and spoke frequently on topics related to FDA and its regulatory programs, including risk management, the application of risk assessment to food safety decisions, federal preemption, drug approvals, color additive and medical device regulation, and the need to maintain FDA funding for consumer protection. In some of his early writings, Mr. Taylor addressed the Delaney Clause, a part of a 1958 federal law that prohibits any carcinogenic chemical from being added to food that is processed. In the 1970's and 80's, FDA scientists had developed scientific risk assessments on the basis of which they could conclude that, under certain circumstances, very low human exposure to chemicals found to cause cancer in animals nevertheless could be found safe under the "reasonable certainty of no harm" safety standard for food additives. Some commentators argued that FDA should interpret the Delaney Clause as allowing FDA to approve food additives based on a de minimis risk legal interpretation.

In 1981, Taylor argued in Legal Times of Washington that it was the role of Congress, not FDA, to decide if there should be a de minimis interpretation of the Delaney Clause. In 1986, after FDA had established a de minimis risk interpretation for color additives he made a presentation at the Brookings Institution, subsequently published, explaining the legal and policy rationale for FDA's interpretation and urging that FDA take a cautious, science-based approach to its implementation with protection of public health as its overriding concern. From 1986 to 1987, Taylor served on a National Academy of Sciences Committee that studied the application of the Delaney Clause in pesticide regulation and participated in a Keystone Center dialogue on pesticide regulation, which contributed to legislation that strengthened safety standards for residues of carcinogenic pesticides in food.

== US Food and Drug Administration, 1991-1994 ==
On July 17, 1991, Michael Taylor left King & Spalding to return to the FDA in the newly created post of Deputy Commissioner for Policy established by FDA Commissioner David A. Kessler. In this position, Taylor led FDA's new Office of Policy and, on behalf of the commissioner, oversaw development of policy and regulations in all FDA program areas, including food, drugs, and medical devices.

A major focus area for FDA during this period was implementation of the Nutrition Labeling and Education Act of 1990, which overhauled food labeling in the United States by mandating nutrition labeling on all food packages (now the ubiquitous "Nutrition Facts" panel), and regulating health claims, nutrient content claims, and claims such as "healthy" and "light". As Deputy Commissioner for Policy, Taylor oversaw the extensive policy development and rulemaking process needed to implement NLEA. He was also FDA's point person in contentious negotiations over the content of the rules with the U.S. Department of Agriculture and the White House due to food industry and USDA opposition to many provisions of the rules, especially regarding FDA's proposal to clearly disclose the fat content of foods in relation to calories per serving. This culminated in an Oval Office meeting in December 1992, with then-lame duck President George H. W. Bush, HHS Secretary Lou Sullivan, USDA Secretary Ed Madigan, Vice President Dan Quayle and Chief of Staff James Baker in which Taylor advised the president that the administration had run out of time to legally change FDA's preferred policy. The White House sided with FDA and cleared the regulations. Among the other FDA initiatives Taylor led were the streamlining and enhanced management of the FDA regulations process, a comprehensive review of FDA's international activities, promulgation of regulations implementing the Safe Medical Devices Act of 1990, and development of new seafood safety regulations. He also oversaw development of FDA policies on such matters as human tissue transplantation, food biotechnology (discussed below), dietary supplement safety, and off-label use of drugs and company-supported continuing medical education.

In the 1993 transition to the administration of President Bill Clinton, Kessler and Taylor were retained in their FDA positions despite having been political appointees of the Bush administration.

== United States Department of Agriculture, 1994-1996 ==
In late 1992 and early 1993, an outbreak of foodborne illness caused by E. coli-contaminated hamburger sold at the Jack in the Box fast food chain on the US West Coast killed four children and seriously injured over 700 other people. This event triggered calls for reform of USDA's meat safety program, which at the time inspected every beef carcass for visible defects but did not hold slaughterhouses or ground beef processing establishments responsible for preventing contamination with dangerous bacteria, such as the highly pathogenic E. coli O157:H7 implicated in the Jack in the Box outbreak. At that time, USDA did not consider such bacteria to be adulterants and thus unlawful in raw meat because consumers were expected to cook the food properly.

In August 1994, Taylor was appointed by USDA Secretary Mike Espy to be administrator of the Food Safety and Inspection Service (FSIS), with a charge to lead reform in the meat and poultry inspection program. On September 29, 1994, in a speech before a meeting of the American Meat Institute, Taylor outlined his reform agenda to meat industry leaders, which included overhauling the FSIS program to establish legal accountability for industry to prevent contamination of meat and poultry with dangerous bacteria, including E.coli O157:H7. As a first step toward that accountability, Taylor informed the industry audience that henceforth FSIS would consider raw ground beef containing any amount of that pathogen to be adulterated, unlawful for sale, and thus subject to recall. He also announced that FSIS would begin testing for E. coli O157:H7 in raw ground beef. One author later called this "perhaps the single most important change in USDA history." The meat industry filed a federal lawsuit challenging Taylor's new policy; the court rejected the industry challenge and upheld the policy. "And with that the world changed," according to another commentator. "This seemingly simple change – calling E. coli O157:H7 an adulterant – has over the last 20 years saved countless children from kidney failure and death."

In February 1995, FSIS proposed extensive new rules overhauling the FSIS inspection program by mandating that all meat and poultry slaughter and processing plants implement the preventive system for food safety called of Hazard Analysis and Critical Control Points (HACCP). The proposed regulations also included the first-ever FSIS requirements for microbial testing to verify process control in raw meat production and the first-ever USDA pathogen reduction standards, targeting Salmonella. The meat industry supported the HACCP requirement but opposed the mandatory microbial testing and performance standards and asked Congress to halt the rulemaking process and conduct a "negotiated rulemaking" with industry. The industry effort failed. In July 1996, FSIS issued the final HACCP and pathogen reduction regulations, which were announced by President Clinton in an Oval Office radio address attended by Secretary Dan Glickman, Taylor and foodborne illness victims and their families.

To strengthen the frontline capacity of FSIS to implement the HACCP-based inspection reforms, Taylor led an agency reorganization that streamlined the FSIS headquarters structure, removed the regional layer of management from the field organization, and reorganized the frontline field offices.

In October 1994, Congress passed legislation to elevate the food safety function within USDA by establishing the new position of Under Secretary for Food Safety, to which the FSIS administrator would report. Taylor was immediately appointed acting under secretary, while remaining as FSIS administrator. He held both positions until November 1996, when he stepped down to return to the private sector.

== Private Sector, 1996-2000 ==
In November 1996, Taylor left FSIS and rejoined King & Spalding, where he practiced until September 1998. Taylor then joined Monsanto Company, where he worked for 16 months as Vice President for Public Policy. This was an advisory "think tank" position that involved advising senior management on policy issues but not public affairs, regulatory affairs or lobbying. Taylor advised Monsanto's senior leaders to abandon their opposition to the labeling of biotech foods and facilitated internal discussions that led to Monsanto's decision not to proceed with marketing the so-called Terminator gene. Taylor worked closely with Monsanto CEO Bob Shapiro on a strategy to improve Monsanto's stakeholder engagement and openness to stakeholder concerns. This led to Shapiro's presentation at an October 9, 1999 Greenpeace Business Conference, in which he pledged to listen more and "reconsider the moral, religious and ethical ramifications of the use of biotechnology in agriculture." Taylor left the company in January 2000 based on continuing strategic disagreements with senior Monsanto business leader and his conclusion that he was unable to have impact on the company's practices.

== Biotechnology ==
Taylor was criticized for his involvement in biotechnology issues at King & Spalding, FDA and Monsanto by organic farming advocates and other opponents of biotechnology who argue the safety of the products have been adequately reviewed by FDA. In addition, advocates in favor of organic food have attributed to Taylor's writings on the Delaney Clause an alleged desire to financially benefit Monsanto, though Taylor's Delaney Clause interest and writings pre-date any relationship with Monsanto. Monsanto was a client of King & Spalding for whom Taylor performed some legal work on pesticide and biotechnology matters in the 1980s not related to the Delaney Clause.

As Deputy Commissioner for Policy at FDA (1991–94), Taylor oversaw the development of biotechnology policies by FDA's Center for Food Safety and Applied Nutrition, including FDA's 1992 guidance on genetically modified (GM) foods and a guidance that milk from cows treated with bovine growth hormone (BGH did not have to be labeled as such). In February, 1994 anti-biotechnology activist Jeremy Rifkin charged that Taylor had a conflict of interest with respect to the approval of rBST, a hormone for dairy cows produced using biotechnology and used to increase milk production. King & Spalding had represented Monsanto in the FDA approval process for rBST.

The HHS Ethics Counsel and the congressional Government Accountability Office (GAO) both investigated the Rifken allegation, as well as whether Taylor had violated conflict of interest rules by virtue of his involvement in the 1992 guidance documents. On the rBST approval, both HHS and GAO found that Taylor had not been involved in King & Spalding's rBST work. They also noted that Taylor had signed a recusal agreement with the HHS Ethics Counsel that precluded his involvement in such product-specific matters. They found that, in compliance with that agreement, Taylor did not participate in FDA's rBST decision process. They thus found he had not violated any conflict of interest rules with respect to rBST. On the guidance documents, HHS and GAO also found that Taylor had fully complied with his recusal agreement regarding such general policy matters and had not violated any conflict of interest rules.

At a meeting of health care journalists in 2013, Taylor acknowledged objections people had expressed about his working on FDA-related matters in both the public and private sectors and said "I fully understand and respect that point of view." He also noted that he complied with all applicable ethics rule and that some of the concerns were based on mistaken facts, such as the claim that he participated in FDA's decision on rBST.

In 2003, Taylor published a commentary in Nature Biotechnology criticizing the US government and the biotechnology industry for being overly aggressive in promoting the technology internationally, disregarding the social dimension of public response to food biotechnology, and opposing labeling and other means to support informed choice about biotechnology by consumers and developing countries. Taylor's commentary also called for mandatory pre-market approval of foods derived from biotechnology and stronger post-market oversight, measures the biotechnology industry has opposed.

== Academic and Policy Research Career ==
Beginning in 2000, Taylor spent 10 years in academia working on food system issues, primarily involving food security in Africa and food safety in the US and globally.

In June 2000, he joined the think tank Resources for the Future (RFF) in the position of Senior Fellow and Director of RFF's Center for Risk Management. His food security work there, some of which was funded by the Rockefeller Foundation, included an analysis of the US government response to the World Food Summit's hunger reduction goal, biotechnology patent reform to enable equitable access by African farmers to disease- and drought-resistance technologies for food security purposes, and a comprehensive analysis of US agricultural development assistance for Africa conducted in collaboration with the Partnership to Cut Hunger and Poverty in Africa.

Taylor's food safety work at RFF focused on the use of risk analysis and risk-based priority setting to improve food safety and on reform of the organizational structure for food safety in the United States. The risk analysis work included helping lead a multi-university collaboration, the Food Safety Research Consortium, in the development of a risk-based priority setting framework. He co-edited and contributed to a book on risk-based priority setting.

In 2002, Taylor published a paper calling for merging the several US food safety agencies into a single agency responsible and empowered to prevent foodborne illness. Taylor argued in multiple settings for a more rigorous and unified approach to food safety, including:

- "A single agency accountable for providing consistent and coordinated oversight of food safety, from farm to table.
- Institution of Pathogen Reduction: HACCP, with performance standards verified by pathogen testing, at every step of food production.
- Recall authority, access to records, and penalties for lapses in safety procedures.
- Standards for imported foods equivalent to those for domestic foods.
- Food safety to take precedence over commercial considerations in trade disputes."

Following five years at RFF, Taylor was a research professor at the University of Maryland's School of Medicine (2005-2007) and the George Washington University School of Public Health and Health Services (2007-2009). During this time, Taylor continued his work on food security and food safety, including studies and reports on investment in African infrastructure to reduce poverty and improve food security, nanotechnology regulation, strengthening state and local food safety roles, and organizational restructuring of food safety functions at the Department of Health and Human Services, including establishing a new position of Deputy Commissioner for Foods to lead an integrated food safety.

In November 2008, Taylor was named to serve on the USDA transition team for the incoming Obama administration.

== FDA, 2009 - 2016 ==
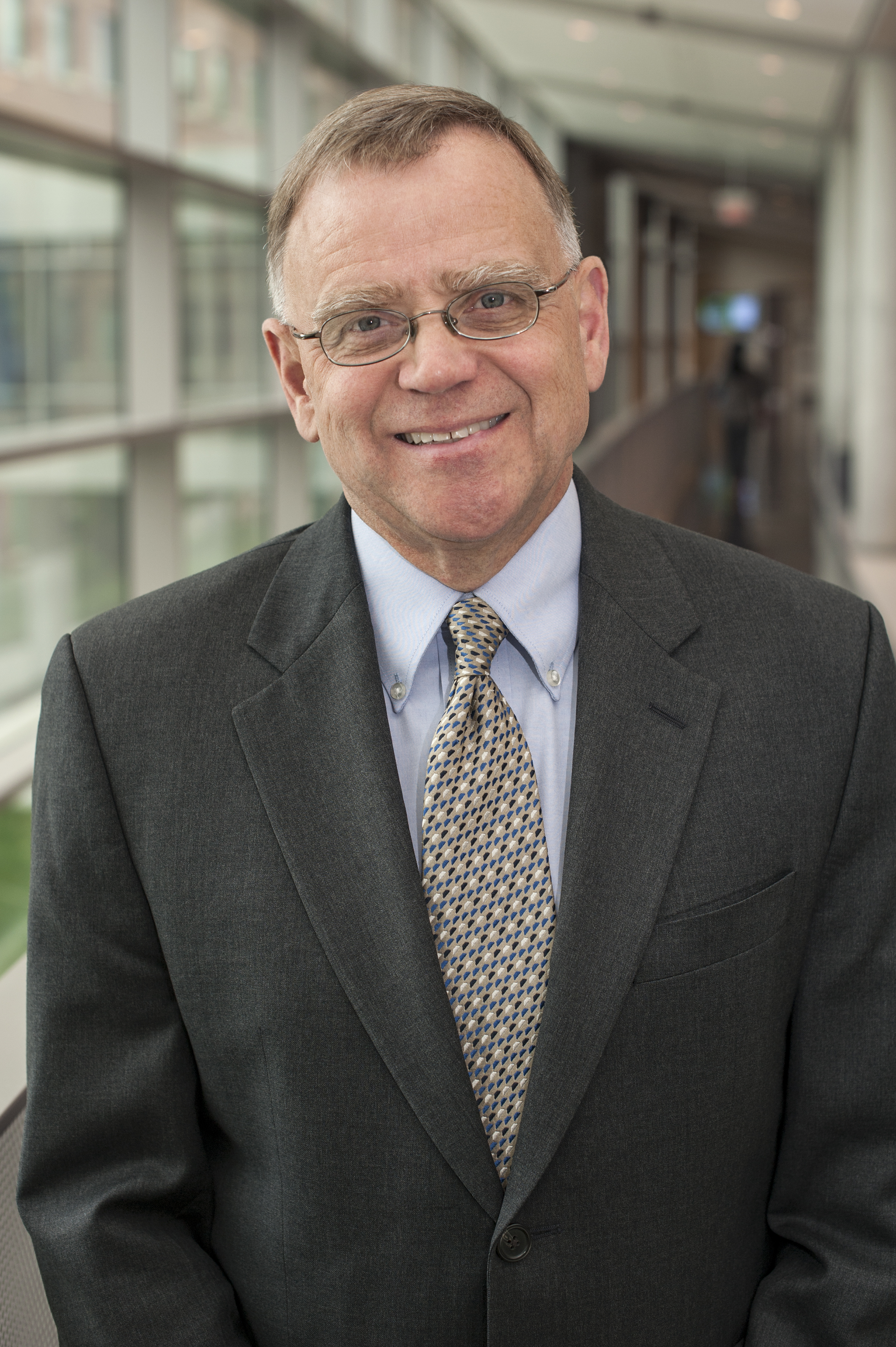
Taylor in 2013

On July 7, 2009, Taylor returned to government as Senior Advisor to FDA Commissioner Margaret Hamburg to further Commissioner Hamburg's plan to create a new commissioner-level Office of Foods and to begin planning for implementation of anticipated new food safety legislation. On January 13, 2010, he was appointed to lead the new office as Deputy Commissioner for Foods, with management oversight of the two FDA centers working on food safety, food additives, chemical contaminants, nutrition, dietary supplements, food labeling, animal drugs and feed, pet food and cosmetics – the Center for Food Safety and Applied Nutrition (CFSAN) and the Center for Veterinary Medicine (CVM).

Taylor led FDA's role in the legislative enactment of the Food Safety Modernization Act of 2011 (FSMA), which was aimed primarily at preventing foodborne illness, allergic reactions and other health harms caused by contaminants in food. FSMA mandated modern preventive controls in all food manufacturing facilities, based on HACCP principles; new fresh produce safety standards addressing on-farm growing practices; a new import safety program to assure imports meet US safety standards; and extensive collaboration on food safety with state agencies and foreign governments. Taylor oversaw the rulemaking required to implement FSMA, led an extensive program of stakeholder outreach and dialogue on the content of the rules, and worked with CFSAN, CVM and FDA's inspection unit (the Office of Regulatory Affairs) on the development of strategies for field-based implementation of the new food safety rules, focused on maximizing prevention of food safety problems and strengthening outbreak response. This included establishing within FDA the Coordinated Outbreak Response and Evaluation (CORE) Network to enhance collaboration on outbreak response within FDA and with the Centers for Disease Control and Prevention (CDC) and state and local partners. Taylor also worked with FDA's constituents and Congress to mobilize new appropriated resources for FSMA implementation and actively engaged FDA's food regulatory partners in Europe, China, Mexico and Canada on FSMA implementation.

Other FDA regulatory initiatives in which Taylor was involved during the 2009-16 period included banning most uses of trans fat in food, issuing new Nutrition Facts and menu labeling rules, setting targets for reducing sodium in food, action to limit arsenic levels in infant foods, responding to the proliferation of added caffeine in processed foods, and phasing out medically important antibiotics for animal production purposes.

On March 8, 2016, Taylor announced that he would be departing the FDA as of June 1, 2016.

== Post-FDA Activities, 2016-present ==
Immediately after Taylor left FDA in June 2016, his primary focus was on food safety in Africa. He led a project for the Global Food Safety Partnership (GFSP) at the World Bank to analyze international donor investment in food safety in sub-Saharan Africa and make recommendations for improvement. The project team compiled data on over 500 donor programs and obtained input from nearly 200 experts and stakeholders to document patterns and trends in current investments and opportunities for improvement. The result was a 2019 GFSP report that was released in February 2019 at the first UN-sponsored International Food Safety Conference in Addis Ababa, Ethiopia. The report's recommendations included more investment in Africa's informal food markets and in supporting consumer food safety awareness and ability to demand better food safety practices.

In February 2017, Taylor joined the board of Stop Foodborne Illness ("STOP"), which supports victims of serious illness and their families in advocating for strengthening food safety policies and practices in government and industry and building food safety cultures that recognize the human impact of foodborne illness.

== In everyday culture ==
Taylor is featured in two documentaries:

- The Future of Food
- The World According to Monsanto
