= Monsanto =

American agribusiness corporation (1901–2018)

Monsanto Company
- Traded as: NYSE: MON (until 2018) (S&P 500 component)
- Industry: Agribusiness
- Founded: September 26, 1901; 125 years ago Reformed in 2000 (spun off from Pharmacia & Upjohn)
- Founder: John Francis Queeny
- Defunct: June 7, 2018; 8 years ago
- Fate: Acquired by Bayer
- Headquarters: Creve Coeur, Missouri, U.S.
- Key people: Hugh Grant; (final Chairman, President, & CEO); Pierre Courduroux; (final Vice President & CFO)
- Products: Herbicides; Crop Seeds; GMOs
- Parent: Pharmacia & Upjohn (1999–2000); Bayer AG (2018–present)

The Monsanto Company (/mɒnˈsæntoʊ/) was an American agrochemical and agricultural biotechnology corporation founded in 1901 and headquartered in Creve Coeur, Missouri. Monsanto's best-known product is Roundup, a glyphosate-based herbicide, developed in the 1970s. Later, the company became a major producer of genetically engineered crops. In 2018, the company ranked 199th on the Fortune 500 of the largest United States corporations by revenue.

Monsanto was one of four groups to introduce genes into plants in 1983, and was among the first to conduct field trials of genetically modified crops in 1987. It was one of the top-ten U.S. chemical companies until it divested most of its chemical businesses between 1997 and 2002, through a process of mergers and spin-offs that focused the company on biotechnology.

Monsanto was one of the first companies to apply the biotechnology industry business model to agriculture, using techniques developed by biotech drug companies. In this business model, companies recoup R&D expenses by exploiting biological patents.

Monsanto's roles in agricultural changes, biotechnology products, lobbying of government agencies, and roots as a chemical company have resulted in controversies. The company once manufactured controversial products such as the insecticide DDT, PCBs, Agent Orange, and recombinant bovine growth hormone.

In September 2016, German chemical company Bayer announced its intent to acquire Monsanto for US$66 billion in an all-cash deal. After gaining U.S. and EU regulatory approval, the sale was completed on June 7, 2018. The name Monsanto was no longer used, but Monsanto's previous product brand names were maintained. In June 2020, Bayer agreed to pay numerous settlements in lawsuits involving ex-Monsanto products Roundup, PCBs and Dicamba. Owing to the massive financial and reputational setbacks caused by ongoing litigation concerning Monsanto's herbicide Roundup, the Bayer-Monsanto merger is considered one of the worst corporate mergers in history.

== History ==
=== "Pre-Pharmacia" Monsanto ===
==== 1901 to WWII ====
In 1901, Monsanto was founded in St. Louis, Missouri, as a chemical company. The founder was John Francis Queeny, who, at age 42, was a 30‑year veteran of the nascent pharmaceutical industry. He funded the firm with his own money and capital from a soft drink distributor. He named the company after his wife's maiden name, Olga Méndez Monsanto, who was an heir of the Monsanto family.

The company's first products were commodity food additives, such as the artificial sweetener saccharin, caffeine and vanillin.

Monsanto expanded to Europe in 1919 in a partnership with Graesser's Chemical Works at Cefn Mawr, Wales. The venture produced vanillin, aspirin and its raw ingredient salicylic acid, and later rubber processing chemicals.

In the 1920s, Monsanto expanded into basic industrial chemicals such as sulfuric acid and PCBs. Queeny's son Edgar Monsanto Queeny took over the company in 1928.

In 1926 the company founded and incorporated a town called Monsanto in Illinois (now known as Sauget). It was formed to provide minimal regulation and low taxes for Monsanto plants at a time when local jurisdictions had most of the responsibility for environmental rules. It was renamed in honor of Leo Sauget, its first village president.

In 1935, Monsanto bought the Swann Chemical Company in Anniston, Alabama, and thereby entered the business of producing PCBs.

In 1936, Monsanto acquired Thomas & Hochwalt Laboratories in Dayton, Ohio, to acquire the expertise of Charles Allen Thomas and Carroll A. Hochwalt. The acquisition became Monsanto's Central Research Department. Thomas spent the rest of his career at Monsanto, serving as President (1951–1960) and Board Chair (1960–1965). He retired in 1970. In 1943, Thomas was called to a meeting in Washington, D.C., with Leslie Groves, commander of the Manhattan Project, and James Conant, president of Harvard University and chairman of the National Defense Research Committee (NDRC). They urged Thomas to become co-director of the Manhattan Project at Los Alamos with Robert Oppenheimer, but Thomas was reluctant to leave Dayton and Monsanto. He joined the NDRC, and Monsanto's Central Research Department began to conduct related research. To that end, Monsanto operated the Dayton Project, and later Mound Laboratories, and assisted in the development of the first nuclear weapons.

==== Post-WWII ====
In 1946, Monsanto developed and marketed "All" laundry detergent, which it sold to Lever Brothers in 1957. In 1947, its styrene factory was destroyed in the Texas City Disaster. In 1949, Monsanto acquired American Viscose Corporation from Courtaulds. In 1954, Monsanto partnered with German chemical giant Bayer to form Mobay and market polyurethanes in the United States.

Monsanto began manufacturing DDT in 1944, along with some 15 other companies. This insecticide was used to kill malaria-transmitting mosquitoes, but it was banned in the United States in 1972 due to its harmful environmental impacts.

In 1977, Monsanto stopped producing PCBs; Congress banned PCB production two years later.

==== 1960s and 1970s ====
In the mid‑1960s, William Standish Knowles and his team invented a way to selectively synthesize enantiomers via asymmetric hydrogenation. This was the first method for the catalytic production of pure chiral compounds. Knowles' team designed the "first industrial process to chirally synthesize an important compound"—L‑dopa, which is used to treat Parkinson's disease. In 2001, Knowles and Ryōji Noyori won the Nobel Prize in Chemistry. In the mid-1960s, chemists at Monsanto developed the Monsanto process for making acetic acid, which until 2000 was the most widely used production method. In 1964, Monsanto chemists invented AstroTurf (initially ChemGrass).

In the 1960s and 1970s, Monsanto was a producer of Agent Orange for United States Armed Forces operations in Vietnam, and settled out of court in a lawsuit brought by veterans in 1984. In 1968, it became the first company to start mass production of (visible) light-emitting diodes (LEDs), using gallium arsenide phosphide. From 1968 to 1970, sales doubled every few months. Their products (discrete LEDs and seven-segment numeric displays) became industry standards. The primary markets then were electronic calculators, digital watches and digital clocks. Monsanto became a pioneer of optoelectronics in the 1970s.

Between 1968 and 1974, the company sponsored the PGA Tour event in Pensacola, Florida, which was renamed the Monsanto Open.

In 1974, Harvard University and Monsanto signed a 10-year research grant to support the cancer research of Judah Folkman, which became the largest such arrangement ever made; medical inventions arising from that research were the first for which Harvard allowed its faculty to submit patent application.

==== 1980 to 1989: Becoming an agribiotech company ====
Monsanto scientists were among the first to genetically modify a plant cell, publishing their results in 1983. Five years later the company conducted the first field tests of genetically modified crops. Increasing involvement in agricultural biotechnology dates from the installment of Richard Mahoney as Monsanto's CEO in 1983. This involvement increased under the leadership of Robert Shapiro, appointed CEO in 1995, leading ultimately to the disposition of product lines unrelated to agriculture.

In 1985, Monsanto acquired G.D. Searle & Company, a life sciences company that focused on pharmaceuticals, agriculture and animal health. In 1993, its Searle division filed a patent application for Celebrex, which in 1998 became the first selective COX‑2 inhibitor to be approved by the U.S. Food and Drug Administration (FDA). Celebrex became a blockbuster drug and was often mentioned as a key reason for Pfizer's acquisition of Monsanto's pharmaceutical business in 2002.

==== 1990 to 1999: Moving into the seed market & industry consolidation ====
In 1994, Monsanto introduced a recombinant version of bovine somatotropin, brand-named Posilac. Monsanto later sold this business to Eli Lilly and Company.

In 1996, Monsanto purchased Agracetus, the biotechnology company that had generated the first transgenic cotton, soybeans, peanuts and other crops, and from which Monsanto had been licensing technology since 1991.

In 1997, Monsanto divested Solutia, a company created to carry off the responsibility for Monsanto's PCB business and associated liabilities, along with some related organic chemical production.

Monsanto first entered the maize seed business when it purchased 40% of Dekalb in 1996; it purchased the remainder of the corporation in 1998. In 1997, the company first published an annual report citing Monsanto's Law, a biotechnological take on Moore's Law, indicating its future directions and exponential growth in the use of biotechnology. In the same year, Californian GMO company Calgene was acquired. In 1998, Monsanto purchased Cargill's international seed business, which gave it access to sales and distribution facilities in 51 countries. In 2005, it finalized the purchase of Seminis Inc, a leading global vegetable and fruit seed company, for $1.4 billion. This made it the world's largest conventional seed company.

In 1999, Monsanto sold off NutraSweet Co. In December of the same year, Monsanto agreed to merge with Pharmacia & Upjohn, in a deal valuing the transaction at $27 billion. The agricultural division became a wholly owned subsidiary of the "new" Pharmacia; Monsanto's medical research division, which included products such as Celebrex.

==== "Pre-Pharmacia" Monsanto overview ====
Illustration of the company's mergers, acquisitions, spin-offs and historical predecessors:

- Pharmacia Corp. Acquired by Pfizer, 2002
  - Pharmacia & Upjohn
    - Pharmacia (Merged 1995)
      - Kabi Pharmacia
        - Pharmacia Biotech
          - PL Laboratories
          - LKB-produkter AB
            (Acq 1968)
        - Kabi Vitrum
          (Acq 1990)
      - Farmitalia
        (Acq 1993)
    - Upjohn
      (Merged 1995)
  - Monsanto
    - - - - - - - Monsanto
                  (Est 1901)
                - Swann Chemical Company
                  (Acq 1935)
              - Thomas & Hochwalt Laboratories
                (Acq 1936)
            - American Viscose
              (Acq 1949)
          - G. D. Searle & Company
            (Acq 1985)
        - Agracetus
          (Acq 1996)
      - DeKalb Genetics Corporation
        (Acq 1998)
    - Cargill
      (Seed div, Acq 1998)

=== "Post-Pharmacia" Monsanto ===
==== 2000 to 2009: Birth of the "new" Monsanto ====
In 2000, Pharmacia spun off its agro-biotech subsidiary into a new company, the "new Monsanto", focused on four key agricultural crops—soybeans, maize, wheat and cotton. Monsanto agreed to indemnify Pharmacia against potential liabilities from judgments against Solutia. As a result, the new Monsanto continued to be a party to numerous lawsuits over the prior Monsanto. Pharmacia was bought by Pfizer in 2003.

In 2005, Monsanto acquired Emergent Genetics and its Stoneville and NexGen cotton brands. Emergent was the third-largest U.S. cotton seed company, with about 12% of the U.S. market. Monsanto's goal was to obtain "a strategic cotton germplasm and traits platform".

Also in 2005, Monsanto purchased Seminis, the California-based world leader in vegetable seed production, for $1.4 billion. Seminis developed new vegetable varieties using advanced cross-pollination methods. Monsanto indicated that Seminis would continue with non-GM development, while not ruling out GM in the longer term.

In June 2007, Monsanto purchased Delta and Pine Land Company, a major cotton seed breeder, for $1.5 billion. As a condition for approval from the Department of Justice, Monsanto was obligated to divest its Stoneville cotton business, which it sold to Bayer, and to divest its NexGen cotton business, which it sold to Americot. Monsanto also exited the pig-breeding business by selling Monsanto Choice Genetics to Newsham Genetics LC in November, divesting itself of "any and all swine-related patents, patent applications, and all other intellectual property". In 2007, Monsanto and BASF announced a long-term agreement to cooperate in the research, development, and marketing of new plant biotechnology products.

In 2008, Monsanto purchased Dutch seed company De Ruiter Seeds for €546 million, and sold its POSILAC bovine somatotropin brand and related business to Elanco Animal Health, a division of Eli Lilly & Co, in August for $300 million plus "additional contingent consideration".

==== 2010 to 2017: Further growth, Syngenta ====
In 2012, Monsanto purchased for $210 million Precision Planting Inc., a company that produced computer hardware and software designed to enable farmers to increase yield and productivity through more precise planting.

Monsanto purchased San Francisco–based Climate Corp for $930 million in 2013. Climate Corp makes local weather forecasts for farmers based on data modelling and historical data; if the forecasts were wrong, the farmer was compensated.

In May 2013, a worldwide protest against Monsanto corporation, called March Against Monsanto, was held in over 400 cities. A second protest took place in May 2014.

Monsanto tried to acquire Swiss agro-biotechnology rival Syngenta for US$46.5 billion in 2015, but failed. In that year Monsanto was the world's biggest supplier of seeds, controlling 26% of the global seed market (Du Pont was second with 21%). Monsanto was the only manufacturer of white phosphorus for military use in the US.

==== "Post-Pharmacia" Monsanto overview ====
Chart of Monsanto's mergers, acquisitions, spin-offs and historical predecessors:

- Monsanto Inc.
  - - - - - - - - - - - - - - - - - - Monsanto
                                      (Spun off from Pharmacia & Upjohn 2000)
                                    - Emergent Genetics
                                      (Acq 2005)
                                  - Seminis
                                    (Acq 2005)
                                - Icoria, Inc.
                                  (Selected assets, Acq 2005)
                              - Delta & Pine Land Company
                                (Acq 2007)
                            - Monsanto's Asia subsidiaries
                              (Sold to Devgen, 2007)
                          - Monsanto Choice Genetics
                            (Sold to Newsham Genetics, 2007)
                        - De Ruiter Seeds
                          (Acq 2008)
                      - Agroeste Sementes
                        (Acq 2008)
                    - Monsanto's Dairy Product Business
                      (Sold to Eli Lilly & Co, 2008)
                  - - Aly Participacoes Ltda
                      (Acq 2008)
                    - - CanaVialis S.A.
                      - Alellyx S.A.
                - Monsanto's Global Sunflower Assets
                  (Sold to Syngenta, 2009)
              - Divergence, Inc.
                (Acq 2011)
            - Beeologics
              (Acq 2011)
          - Precision Planting Inc.
            (Acq 2012)
        - - Climate Corp
            (Acq 2013)
          - 640 Labs
            (Acq 2014)
      - Agradis, Inc.
        (Select assets, Acq 2013)
    - Rosetta Green Ltd
      (Acq 2013)
  - American Seeds, Inc.
    - - - - - - - - - - Channel Bio Corp
                        (Acq 2004)
                      - Stone Seeds
                        (Acq 2005)
                      - Trelay Seeds
                        (Acq 2005)
                      - Stewart Seeds
                        (Acq 2005)
                      - Fontanelle Hybrids
                        (Acq 2005)
                    - Specialty Hybrids
                      (Acq 2005)
                  - NC+ Hybrids, Inc.
                    (Acq 2005)
                - Heritage Seeds
                  (Acq 2006)
              - Gold Country Seed, Inc.
                (Acq 2006)
            - Campbell Seed
              (Seed marketing and sales business, Acq 2006)
          - Trisler Seed Farms
            (Acq 2006)
        - Kruger Seed Company
          (Acq 2006)
      - Sieben Hybrids
        (Acq 2006)
    - Diener Seeds
      (Seed marketing and sales businesses, Acq 2006)
  - International Seed Group, Inc.
    - Poloni Semences
      (Acq 2007)
    - Charentais melon breeding company
      (Acq 2007)

=== Sale to Bayer ===
In September 2016, Monsanto agreed to be acquired by Bayer for US$66 billion. In an effort to receive regulatory clearance for the deal, Bayer announced the sale of significant portions of its current agriculture businesses, including its seed and herbicide businesses, to BASF.

The deal was approved by the European Union on March 21, 2018, and approved in the United States on May 29, 2018. The sale closed on June 7, 2018; Bayer announced its intent to discontinue the Monsanto name, with the combined company operating solely under the Bayer brand.

Under the terms of merger, Bayer promised to maintain Monsanto's more than 9,000 U.S. jobs and add 3,000 new U.S. high-tech positions. The prospective merger parties said at the time the combined agriculture business planned to spend $16 billion on research and development over the next six years and at least $8 billion on research and development in United States. Bayer would also establish its new global Seeds & Traits and North American commercial headquarters in St. Louis, Missouri.

The Bayer-Monsanto merger is widely considered to be one of the worst mergers in history, mostly due to the exposure to Roundup litigation. By 2023, Bayer's market value had declined by over 60% since its 2016 merger, leaving the company's overall worth at less than half of what it paid to acquire Monsanto.

== Products and associated issues ==
=== Products currently available ===
==== Glyphosate herbicides ====
Following its 1970 introduction, Monsanto's last commercially relevant United States patent on the herbicide glyphosate (brand name RoundUp) expired in 2000. Glyphosate has since been marketed by many agrochemical companies, in various solution strengths and with various adjuvants, under dozens of tradenames. As of 2009, glyphosate represented about 10% of Monsanto's revenue. Roundup-related products (which include genetically modified seeds) represented about half of Monsanto's gross margin.

==== Crop seed ====
As of 2015, Monsanto's line of seed products included corn, cotton, soy and vegetable seeds.

==== Row crops ====
Many of Monsanto's agricultural seed products are genetically modified, such as for resistance to herbicides, including glyphosate and dicamba. Monsanto calls glyphosate-tolerant seeds Roundup Ready. Monsanto's introduction of this system (planting a glyphosate-resistant seed and then applying glyphosate once plants emerged) allowed farmers to increase yield by planting rows closer together. Without it, farmers had to plant rows far enough apart to allow the control of post-emergent weeds with mechanical tillage. Farmers widely adopted the technology—for example over 80% of maize (Mon 832), soybean (MON-Ø4Ø32-6), cotton, sugar beet and canola planted in the United States are glyphosate-tolerant. Monsanto developed a Roundup Ready genetically modified wheat (MON 71800) but ended development in 2004 due to concerns from wheat exporters about the rejection of genetically modified (GM) wheat by foreign markets.

Two patents were critical to Monsanto's GM soybean business; one expired in 2011 and the other in 2014. The second expiration meant that glyphosate resistant soybeans became "generic". The first harvest of generic glyphosate-tolerant soybeans came in 2015. Monsanto broadly licensed the patent to other seed companies that include glyphosate resistance trait in their seed products. About 150 companies have licensed the technology, including competitors Syngenta and DuPont Pioneer.

Monsanto invented and sells genetically modified seeds that make a crystalline insecticidal protein from Bacillus thuringiensis, known as Bt. In 1995 Monsanto's potato plants producing Bt toxin were approved by the Environmental Protection Agency, following approval by the FDA, making it the first pesticide-producing crop to be approved in the United States. Monsanto subsequently developed Bt maize (MON 802, MON 809, MON 863, MON 810), Bt soybean and Bt cotton.

Monsanto produces seed that has multiple genetic modifications, also known as "stacked traits"—for instance, cotton that make one or more Bt proteins and is resistant to glyphosate. One of these, created in collaboration with Dow Chemical Company, is called SmartStax. In 2011 Monsanto launched the Genuity brand for its stacked-trait products.

As of 2012, the agricultural seed lineup included Roundup Ready alfalfa, canola and sugarbeet; Bt and/or Roundup Ready cotton; sorghum hybrids; soybeans with various oil profiles, most with the Roundup Ready trait; and a wide range of wheat products, many of which incorporate the nontransgenic "clearfield" imazamox-tolerant trait from BASF.

In 2013 Monsanto launched the first transgenic drought tolerance trait in a line of corn hybrids branded DroughtGard. The MON 87460 trait is provided by the insertion of the cspB gene from the soil microbe Bacillus subtilis; it was approved by the USDA in 2011 and by China in 2013.

The "Xtend Crop System" includes seed genetically modified to be resistant to both glyphosate and dicamba, and a herbicide product including those two active ingredients. In December 2014, the system was approved for use in the US. In February 2016, China approved the Roundup Ready 2 Xtend system. The lack of European Union approval led many American traders to reject the use of Xtend soybeans over concerns that the new seeds would become mixed with EU-approved seeds, leading Europe to reject American soybean exports.

==== India-specific issues ====
In 2009, Monsanto scientists discovered insects that had developed resistance to the Bt Cotton planted in Gujarat. Monsanto communicated this to the Indian government and its customers, stating that "Resistance is natural and expected, so measures to delay resistance are important. Among the factors that may have contributed to pink bollworm resistance to the Cry1Ac protein in Bollgard I in Gujarat are limited refuge planting and early use of unapproved Bt cotton seed, planted prior to GEAC approval of Bollgard I cotton, which may have had lower protein expression levels." The company advised farmers to switch to its second generation of Bt cotton – Bolgard II – which had two resistance genes instead of one, the widely recognised best practice to forestall, prevent, and cope with any kind of pesticide resistance. However, this advice was criticized: "an internal analysis of the statement of the Ministry of Environment and Forests says it 'appears that this could be a business strategy to phase out single gene events [that is, the first-generation Bollgard I product] and promote double genes [the second generation Bollgard II] which would fetch higher price.'"

Monsanto's GM cotton seed was the subject of NGO agitation because of its higher cost. Indian farmers crossed GM varieties with local varieties, using plant breeding, violating their agreements with Monsanto. In 2009, high prices of Bt Cotton were blamed for forcing farmers of Jhabua district into debt when the crops died due to lack of rain.

==== Vegetables ====
In 2012 Monsanto was the world's largest supplier of non-GE vegetable seeds by value, with sales of $800M. 95% of the research and development for vegetable seed is in conventional breeding. The company concentrates on improving flavor. According to their website they sell "4,000 distinct seed varieties representing more than 20 species". Broccoli, with the brand name Beneforté, with increased amounts of glucoraphanin was introduced in 2010 following development by its Seminis subsidiary.

=== Former products ===
==== Polychlorinated biphenyls (PCBs) ====
Until it ended production in 1977, Monsanto was the source of 99% of the polychlorinated biphenyls (PCBs) used by U.S. industry. They were sold under brand names including Aroclor and Santotherm; the name Santotherm is still used for non-chlorinated products. PCBs are a persistent organic pollutant, and cause cancer in both animals and humans, among other health effects. PCBs were initially welcomed due to the electrical industry's need for durable, safer (than flammable mineral oil) cooling and insulating fluid for industrial transformers and capacitors. PCBs were also commonly used as stabilizing additives in the manufacture of flexible PVC coatings for electrical wiring and in electronic components to enhance PVC heat and fire resistance. As transformer leaks occurred and toxicity problems arose near factories, their durability and toxicity became recognized as serious problems. PCB production was banned by the U.S. Congress in 1979 and by the Stockholm Convention on Persistent Organic Pollutants in 2001.

==== Agent Orange ====
Monsanto, Dow Chemical, and eight other chemical companies made Agent Orange for the U.S. Department of Defense. It was given its name from the color of the orange-striped barrels in which it was shipped, and was by far the most widely used of the so-called "Rainbow Herbicides".

==== Bovine somatotropin ====
Monsanto developed and sold recombinant bovine somatotropin (also known as rBST and rBGH), a synthetic hormone that increases milk production by 11–16% when injected into cows. In October 2008, Monsanto sold this business to Eli Lilly for $300 million plus additional considerations.

The use of rBST remains controversial with respect to its effects on cows and their milk.

In some markets, milk from cows that are not treated with rBST is sold with labels indicating that it is rBST-free: this milk has proved popular with consumers. In reaction to this, in early 2008 a pro-rBST advocacy group called "American Farmers for the Advancement and Conservation of Technology" (AFACT), made up of dairies and originally affiliated with Monsanto, formed and began lobbying to ban such labels. AFACT stated that "absence" labels can be misleading and imply that milk from cows treated with rBST is inferior.

=== Uncommercialized products ===
Monsanto also developed notable technologies that were not ultimately commercialized.

==== "Terminator" seeds ====
Genetic use restriction technology, colloquially known as "terminator technology", produces plants with sterile seeds. This trait would prevent the spread of those seeds into the wild. It also would prevent farmers from planting seeds they harvest, requiring them to purchase seed for every planting, allowing the company to enforce its licensing terms via technology. Farmers have been buying hybrid seeds for generations, instead of replanting their harvest, because second-generation hybrid seeds are inferior. Nevertheless, most seed companies contract only with farmers who agree not to plant harvested seeds.

Terminator technology has been developed by governmental labs, university researchers and companies. The technology has not been used commercially. Rumors that Monsanto and other companies intended to introduce terminator technology caused protests, for example in India.

In 1999, Monsanto pledged not to commercialize terminator technology. The Delta & Pine Land Company of Mississippi intended to commercialize the technology, but D&PL was acquired by Monsanto in 2007.

Monsanto "Terminator seeds" were never commercialized nor used in any farmer's field anywhere in the world. The patent expired in 2015.

==== GM wheat ====
Monsanto developed several strains of genetically modified wheat, including glyphosate-resistant strains, in the 1990s. Field tests were done in the United States between 1998 and 2005. As of 2017, no genetically modified wheat had been released for commercial use.

== Legal affairs ==
Monsanto engaged in high-profile lawsuits, as both plaintiff and defendant. It defended lawsuits mostly over its products' health and environmental effects. Monsanto used the courts to enforce its patents, particularly in agricultural biotechnology, an approach similar to that of other companies in the field, such as Dupont Pioneer and Syngenta. Monsanto also became one of the most controversial large corporations in the world, over a range of issues involving its industrial and agricultural chemical products, and GM seed. In April 2018, just prior to Bayer's acquisition, Bayer indicated that improving Monsanto's reputation represented a major challenge. That June, Bayer announced it would drop the Monsanto name as part of a campaign to regain consumer trust.

=== Argentina ===
Argentina approved Roundup Ready soy in 1996. Between 1996 and 2008, soy production grew from 14 million acres to 42 million acres. The growth was driven by Argentine investors' interest in export markets. The consolidation led to a decrease in production of many staples such as milk, rice, maize, potatoes and lentils. As of 2004, about 150,000 small farmers had left the countryside; as of 2009, 50% in the Chaco region.

The Guardian reported that a Monsanto representative had said, "any problems with GM soya were to do with use of the crop as a monoculture, not because it was GM. If you grow any crop to the exclusion of any other you are bound to get problems."

In 2005 and 2006, Monsanto attempted to enforce its patents on soymeal originating in Argentina and shipped to Spain by having Spanish customs officials seize the soymeal shipments. The seizures were part of a larger attempt by Monsanto to put pressure on the Argentinian government to enforce Monsanto's seed patents.

In 2013, environmentalist groups objected to a Monsanto corn seed conditioning facility in Malvinas Argentinas, Córdoba. Neighbours objected to the risk of environmental impact. Court rulings supported the project, but environmentalist groups organised demonstrations and opened an online petition for the subject to be decided in a popular referendum. The court rulings stipulated that while construction could continue, the facility could not begin operating until the environmental impact report required by law had been duly presented.

In 2016, Monsanto reached an agreement with Argentina's government on soybean seed royalty payments. Monsanto agreed to give the Argentine Seed Institute (Inase) oversight over crops grown from Monsanto's Intacta genetically modified soybean seeds. Before the agreement, Argentine farmers generally avoided royalties by using seeds from previous harvests or purchased from non-registered suppliers. Inase agreed to delegate testing to grain exchanges. About 6 million sample tests were to be conducted annually. Seeds that appear to be GMOs may be tested again using a polymerase chain reaction test.

=== Brazil ===
Brazil is the second largest producer of GMO soy. In 2003, GM soy was found in fields planted in the state of Rio Grande do Sul. This was a controversial decision, and in response, the Landless Workers' Movement protested by invading and occupying several Monsanto farm plots used for research, training and seed-processing. In 2005, Brazil passed a law creating a regulatory pathway for GM crops.

=== China ===
Monsanto was criticized by Chinese economist Larry Lang for controlling the Chinese soybean market, and for trying to do the same to Chinese corn and cotton.

=== India ===
In the late 1990s and early 2000s, public attention was drawn to suicides by indebted farmers following crop failures. For example, in the early 2000s, farmers in Andhra Pradesh (AP) were in economic crisis due to high-interest rates and crop failures, leading to widespread unrest and farmer suicides. Monsanto was one focus of protests with respect to the price and yields of Bt seed. In 2005, the Genetic Engineering Approval Committee, the Indian regulatory authority, released a study on field tests of certain Bt cotton strains in AP and ruled that Monsanto could not market those strains in AP because of poor yields. At about the same time, the state agriculture minister barred the company from selling Bt cotton seed, because Monsanto refused a request by the state government to provide pay about Rs 4.5 crore (about one million US$) to indebted farmers in some districts, and because the government blamed Monsanto's seeds for crop failures. The order was later lifted.

In 2006, AP tried to convince Monsanto to reduce the price of Bt seeds. Unsatisfied, the state filed several cases against Monsanto and its Mumbai-based licensee, Maharashtra Hybrid Seeds. Research by International Food Policy Research Institute found no evidence supporting an increased suicide rate following the introduction of Bt cotton and that Bt cotton. The report stated that farmer suicides predated commercial introduction in 2002 (and unofficial introduction in 2001) and that such suicides had made up a fairly constant portion of the overall national suicide rate since 1997. The report concluded that while Bt cotton may have been a factor in specific suicides, the contribution was likely marginal compared to socio-economic factors. As of 2009, Bt cotton was planted in 87% of Indian cotton-growing land.

Critics including Vandana Shiva said that the crop failures could "often be traced to" Monsanto's Bt cotton, that the seeds increased farmer indebtedness and argued that Monsanto misrepresented the profitability of their Bt Cotton, causing losses leading to debt. In 2009, Shiva wrote that Indian farmers who had previously spent as little as ₹7 (rupees) per kilogram were now paying up to ₹17,000 per kilo per year for Bt cotton. In 2012, the Indian Council of Agricultural Research (ICAR) and the Central Cotton Research Institute (CCRI) stated that for the first time farmer suicides could be linked to a decline in the performance of Bt cotton, and advised, "cotton farmers are in a deep crisis since shifting to Bt cotton. The spate of farmer suicides in 2011–12 has been particularly severe among Bt cotton farmers."

In 2004, in response to an order from the Bombay High Court the Tata Institute produced a report on farmer suicides in Maharashtra in 2005. The survey cited "government apathy, the absence of a safety net for farmers, and lack of access to information related to agriculture as the chief causes for the desperate condition of farmers in the state."

Various studies identified the important factors as insufficient or risky credit systems, the difficulty of farming semi-arid regions, poor agricultural income, absence of alternative income opportunities, a downturn in the urban economy which forced non-farmers into farming and the absence of suitable counseling services. ICAR and CCRI stated that the cost of cotton cultivation had jumped as a consequence of rising pesticide costs, while total Bt cotton production in the five years from 2007 to 2012 had declined.

=== United Kingdom ===
Brofiscin Quarry was used as a waste site from about 1965 to 1972 and accepted waste from BP, Veolia and Monsanto. A 2005 report by Environment Agency Wales (EAW) found that the quarry contained up to 75 toxic substances, including heavy metals, Agent Orange and PCBs.

In February 2011, Monsanto agreed to help with the costs of remediation, but did not accept responsibility for the pollution. In 2011, EAW and the Rhondda Cynon Taf council announced that they had decided to place an engineered cap over the waste mass, and stated that the cost would be £1.5 million; previous estimates had been as high as £100 million.

The BBC broadcast a podcast Buried: The Last Witness, on Radio 4 in 2024. It was followed by a television documentary across two weeks in August 2026, Buried with Michael Sheen, describing the manufacture of PCBs by Monsanto in Newport and their dumping of toxic industrial waste in Wales and parts of England.

=== United States ===
==== PCBs ====
In the late 1960s, the Monsanto plant in Sauget, Illinois, was the nation's largest producer of polychlorinated biphenyl (PCB) compounds, which remained in the water along Dead Creek there. An EPA official referred to Sauget as "one of the most polluted communities in the region" and "a soup of different chemicals".

In Anniston, Alabama, plaintiffs in a 2002 lawsuit provided documentation showing that the local Monsanto factory knowingly discharged both mercury and PCB-laden waste into local creeks for over 40 years. In 1969 Monsanto dumped 45 tons of PCBs into Snow Creek, a feeder for Choccolocco Creek, which supplies much of the area's drinking water, and buried millions of pounds of PCB in open-pit landfills located on hillsides above the plant and surrounding neighborhoods. In August 2003, Solutia and Monsanto agreed to pay plaintiffs $700 million to settle claims by over 20,000 Anniston residents.

In June 2020, Bayer proposed paying $650 million to settle local PCB lawsuits, and $170 million to the attorneys-general of New Mexico, Washington and the District of Columbia. Monsanto was acknowledged at the time of the settlement to have ceased making PCBs in 1977, though State Impact of Pennsylvania reported that this did not stop PCBs from contaminating people many years later. State Impact of Pennsylvania stated "In 1979, the EPA banned the use of PCBs, but they still exist in some products produced before 1979. They persist in the environment because they bind to sediments and soils. High exposure to PCBs can cause birth defects, developmental delays, and liver changes." On November 25, 2020, however U.S. District Judge Fernando M. Olguin rejected the proposed $650 million settlement from Bayer and allowed Monsanto-related lawsuits involving PCB to proceed.

In January 2025, Monsanto was ordered to pay $100 million to four people who say they were sickened by PCBs at a school in Monroe, Washington.

==== Polluted sites ====
As of November 2013, Monsanto was associated with nine "active" Superfund sites and 32 "archived" sites in the US, in the EPA's Superfund database. Monsanto was sued and settled multiple times for damaging the health of its employees or residents near its Superfund sites through pollution and poisoning.

==== GM wheat ====
In 2013, a Monsanto-developed transgenic cultivar of glyphosate-resistant wheat was discovered on a farm in Oregon, growing as a weed or "volunteer plant". The final Oregon field test had occurred in 2001. As of May 2013, the GMO seed source was unknown. Volunteer wheat from a former test field two miles away was tested and was not found to be glyphosate-tolerant. Monsanto faced penalties up to $1 million over potential violations of the Plant Protection Act. The discovery threatened world-leading US wheat exports, which totaled $8.1 billion in 2012. This wheat variety was rarely exported to Europe and was more likely destined for Asia. Monsanto said it had destroyed all the material it held after completing trials in 2004 and it was "mystified" by its appearance. On June 14, 2013, the USDA announced: "As of today, USDA has neither found nor been informed of anything that would indicate that this incident amounts to more than a single isolated incident in a single field on a single farm. All information collected so far shows no indication of the presence of GE wheat in commerce." As of August 30, 2013, while the source of the GM wheat remained unknown, Japan, South Korea and Taiwan had all resumed placing orders.

==== Cancer risks of Roundup ====
Monsanto has faced controversy in the United States over claims that its herbicide products might be carcinogens. There is limited evidence that human cancer risk might increase as a result of occupational exposure to large amounts of glyphosate, as in agricultural work, but no good evidence of such a risk from home use, such as in domestic gardening. The consensus among national pesticide regulatory agencies and scientific organizations is that labeled uses of glyphosate have demonstrated no evidence of human carcinogenicity. Organizations such as the World Health Organization (WHO), the Food and Agriculture Organization, European Commission, Canadian Pest Management Regulatory Agency, and the German Federal Institute for Risk Assessment have concluded that there is no evidence that glyphosate poses a carcinogenic or genotoxic risk to humans. However, one international scientific organization, the International Agency for Research on Cancer (IARC), affiliated with the WHO, has made claims of carcinogenicity in research reviews; in 2015 the IARC declared glyphosate "probably carcinogenic".

As of October 30, 2019, there were 42,700 plaintiffs who said that glyphosate herbicides caused their cancer after the IARC report in 2015 linking glyphosate to cancer in humans. Monsanto denies that Roundup is carcinogenic.

In March 2017, 40 plaintiffs filed a lawsuit at the Alameda County Superior Court, a branch of the California Superior Court, asking for damages caused by the company's glyphosate-based weed-killers, including Roundup, and demanding a jury trial. On August 10, 2018, Monsanto lost the first decided case. Dewayne Johnson, who has non-Hodgkin's lymphoma, was initially awarded $289 million in damages after a jury in San Francisco said that Monsanto had failed to adequately warn consumers of cancer risks posed by the herbicide. Pending appeal, the award was later reduced to $78.5 million. In November 2018, Monsanto appealed the judgement, asking an appellate court to consider a motion for a new trial. A verdict on the appeal was delivered in June 2020 upholding the verdict but further reducing the award to $21.5 million.

On March 27, 2019, Monsanto was found liable in a federal court for Edwin Hardeman's non-Hodgkin's lymphoma and ordered to pay $80 million in damages. A spokesperson for Bayer, by this time the parent company of Monsanto, said the company would appeal the verdict.

On May 13, 2019, a jury in California ordered Bayer to pay $2 billion in damages after finding that the company had failed to adequately inform consumers of the possible carcinogenicity of Roundup. On July 26, 2019, an Alameda County judge cut the settlement to $86.7 million, stating that the judgement by the jury exceeded legal precedent.

In June 2020, Monsanto acquisitor Bayer agreed to settle over a hundred thousand Roundup cancer lawsuits, agreeing to pay $8.8 to $9.6 billion to settle those claims, and $1.5 billion for any future claims. The settlement does not include three cases that have already gone to jury trials and are being appealed.

==== Dicamba lawsuits ====
Following a lawsuit by a peach farmer alleging that Dicamba used as a weed killer drifted in the wind from adjacent crops to destroy his peach orchards, a Missouri trial jury found in February 2020 that Monsanto and codefendant BASF were negligent in design of Dicamba and failed to warn farmers about the product, awarding $15 million for losses and $250 million in punitive damages. On February 14, 2020, the jury involved in a Missouri lawsuit involving tree damage caused by dicamba drift ruled against Bayer and its co-defendant BASF and found in favor of Bader Farms owner Bill Bader. In June 2020, Bayer agreed to a settlement of up to $400 million for all 2015–2020 crop year dicamba claims, not including the $250 million judgement which was issued to Bader. On November 25, 2020, U.S. District Judge Stephen Limbaugh Jr. reduced the punitive damage amount in the Bader Farms case to $60 million.

=== Improper accounting for incentive rebates ===
From 2009 to 2011, Monsanto improperly accounted for incentive rebates. The actions inflated Monsanto's reported profit by $31 million over the two years. Monsanto paid $80 million in penalties pursuant to a subsequent settlement with the US Securities and Exchange Commission. Monsanto materially misstated its consolidated earnings in response to losing market share of Roundup to generic producers. Monsanto overhauled its internal controls. Two of their top CPAs were suspended and Monsanto was required to hire, at their expense, an independent ethics/compliance consultant for two years.

=== Ghostwriting ===
In 2000 three scientists, who were not Monsanto employees, published a review evaluating the safety in humans of glyphosate and Roundup, concluding that it posed no health risks. Monsanto internal emails made public in August 2017 during the Johnson v. Monsanto Co. litigation revealed Monsanto personnel referring to undisclosed ghostwriting of that and subsequent papers. A Monsanto spokesperson responded to the email release that Monsanto had provided only non-substantive cosmetic copyediting that did not alter the studies' conclusions. The paper, in Regulatory Toxicology and Pharmacology, was retracted on November 28, 2025 by the editor-in-chief, citing "lack of authorial independence", "misrepresentation of contributions", "questions of financial compensation", and a variety of concerns over whether the conclusions presented were adequately supported by the scientific data. The retraction decision was prompted by a letter to the journal from researchers Alexander Kaurov and Naomi Oreskes, telling of their research into how the paper and the resulting controversy had influenced discourse about the trustworthiness of scientific reporting.

A review of glyphosate's carcinogenic potential by four independent expert panels, disputing the conclusions of the IARC assessment and finding that glyphosate was unlikely to cause cancer, was published in 2016. That paper was co-written by panels of academic authors, some of whom were recruited by a Canadian company hired by Monsanto. In 2018, the editor-in-chief and publisher of Critical Reviews in Toxicology, where that paper had appeared, published two expressions of concern about that paper, as well as about four related papers that had also been published in that journal in 2016. According to the journal:

"After investigation into the completeness of the original declarations of interest provided by the authors, it was found that these did not fully represent the involvement of Monsanto or its employees or contractors in the authorship of the articles. These corrigenda provide additional disclosure as to contributions to the articles, in some places in contradiction to the statements originally supplied. We have not received an adequate explanation as to why the necessary level of transparency was not met on first submission and welcome the opportunity to address this. We regret that these corrections were necessary and thank those who brought this matter to our attention. To the best of our knowledge, the scholarly record is now accurate; however, we recommend that readers take the additional context the corrected disclosures provide into account when reading the articles."

In 2017, The New York Times reported that a 2015 article attributed to researcher and columnist Henry I. Miller had been drafted by Monsanto. According to the report, Monsanto asked Miller to write an article rebutting the findings of the International Agency for Research on Cancer, and he indicated willingness to do it if he "could start from a high-quality draft". Forbes later removed Miller's blog from Forbes.com and ended their relationship.

In 2026, publisher Taylor & Francis announced that they are investigating two additional papers in Critical Reviews in Toxicology over allegations they were also ghostwritten.

== Government relations ==
=== United States ===
Monsanto regularly lobbied the US government with expenses reaching $8.8 million in 2008 and $6.3 million in 2011. $2 million was spent on matters concerning "Foreign Agriculture Biotechnology Laws, Regulations, and Trade". Some US diplomats in Europe at other times worked directly for Monsanto.

California's 2012 Proposition 37 would have mandated the disclosure of genetically modified crops used in the production of California food products. Monsanto spent $8.1 million opposing passage, making it the largest contributor against the initiative. The proposition was rejected by a 53.7% majority.

In 2009 Michael R. Taylor, food safety expert and former Monsanto VP for Public Policy, became a senior advisor to the FDA Commissioner.

Monsanto is a member of the Washington D.C.–based Biotechnology Industry Organization (BIO), the world's largest biotechnology trade association, which provides "advocacy, business development, and communications services." Between 2010 and 2011 BIO spent a total of $16.43 million on lobbying.

The Monsanto Company Citizenship Fund aka Monsanto Citizenship Fund is a political action committee that donated over $10 million to various candidates from 2003 to 2013.

As of October 2013, Monsanto and DuPont Co. continued backing an anti-labeling campaign, spending roughly $18 million. The state of Washington, along with 26 other states, made proposals in November to require GMO labeling.

==== Revolving door ====
In the US regulatory environment, many individuals move back and forth between positions in the public and private sectors, including at Monsanto. Critics argued that the connections between the company and the government allowed Monsanto to obtain favorable regulations at the expense of consumer safety. Supporters of the practice point to the benefits of competent and experienced individuals in both sectors and to the importance of appropriately managing potential conflicts of interest. The list of such people includes:

- Linda J. Fisher—EPA assistant administrator, then Monsanto VP from 1995 to 2000. then EPA deputy administrator.
- Michael A. Friedman, MD—FDA deputy commissioner.
- Earle H. Harbison Jr., Central Intelligence Agency Deputy Director, then President, Chief Operating Officer, and Director, from 1986 to 1993.
- Robert Holifield—chief of staff of Senate Agriculture Committee, then partner in Lincoln Policy Group.
- Mickey Kantor—US trade representative, then Monsanto board member.
- Blanche Lincoln—US Senator and chair of Agriculture Committee, then founder of lobbying firm Lincoln Policy Group
- William D. Ruckelshaus—EPA Administrator, then acting Director of the Federal Bureau of Investigation, and then Deputy Attorney General of the United States, then EPA administrator, then Monsanto Board member.
- Donald Rumsfeld—Secretary of Defense and previous secretary of Searle, a Monsanto subsidiary, for eight years
- Michael R. Taylor—assistant to the FDA commissioner, then attorney for King & Spalding, then FDA deputy commissioner for policy on food safety between 1991 and 1994. He was cleared of conflict of interest accusations. Then he became Monsanto's VP for Public Policy, becoming Senior Advisor to the FDA Commissioner for the Obama administration.
- Clarence Thomas—Supreme Court Justice who worked as an attorney for Monsanto in the 1970s, then wrote the majority opinion in J. E. M. Ag Supply, Inc. v. Pioneer Hi-Bred International, Inc. finding that "newly developed plant breeds are patentable under the general utility patent laws of the United States."
- Ann Veneman—Secretary of the Department of Agriculture, and member of the board of directors of Calgene

=== United Kingdom ===
During the late 1990s, Monsanto lobbied to raise permitted glyphosate levels in soybeans and was successful in convincing Codex Alimentarius and both the UK and US governments to lift levels 200 times to 20 milligrams per kilogram of soya. When asked how negotiations with Monsanto were conducted, Lord Donoughue, then the Labour Party Agriculture minister in the House of Lords, stated that all information relating to the matter would be "kept secret". During the 24 months prior to the 1997 British election Monsanto representatives had 22 meetings at the departments of Agriculture and the Environment. Stanley Greenberg, an election advisor to Tony Blair, later worked as a Monsanto consultant. Former Labour spokesperson David Hill, became Monsanto's media adviser at the lobbying firm Bell Pottinger. The Labour government was challenged in Parliament about "trips, facilities, gifts and other offerings of financial value provided by Monsanto to civil servants", but only acknowledged that Department of Trade and Industry had two working lunches with Monsanto. Peter Luff, then a Conservative Party MP and Chairman of the Agriculture Select Committee, received up to £10,000 a year from Bell Pottinger on behalf of Monsanto.

=== European Union ===
In January 2011, WikiLeaks documents suggested that US diplomats in Europe responded to a request for help from the Spanish government. One report stated, "In addition, the cables show US diplomats working directly for GM companies such as Monsanto. 'In response to recent urgent requests by [Spanish rural affairs ministry] state secretary Josep Puxeu and Monsanto, post requests renewed US government support of Spain's science-based agricultural biotechnology position through high-level US government intervention.'" The leaked documents showed that in 2009, when the Spanish government's policy approving MON810 was under pressure from EU interests, Monsanto's Director for Biotechnology for Spain and Portugal requested that the US government support Spain on the matter.

The leaks indicated that Spain and the US had worked closely together to "persuade the EU not to strengthen biotechnology laws". Spain was viewed as a key GMO supporter and a leading indicator of support across the continent. The leaks also revealed that in response to an attempt by France to ban MON810 in late 2007, then-US ambassador to France, Craig Roberts Stapleton, asked Washington to "calibrate a targeted retaliation list that [would cause] some pain across the EU", targeting countries that did not support the use of GM crops. This activity transpired after the US, Australia, Argentina, Brazil, Canada, India, Mexico and New Zealand had brought an action against Europe via the World Trade Organization with respect to the EU's banning of GMOs; in 2006, the WTO had ruled against the EU.

Monsanto was a member of EuropaBio, the leading biotechnology trade group in Europe. One of EuropaBio's initiatives is "Transforming Europe's position on GM food". It found "an urgent need to reshape the terms of the debate about GM in Europe". EuropaBio proposed the recruitment of high-profile "ambassadors" to lobby EU officials.

In September 2017, Monsanto lobbyists were banned from the European parliament after the Monsanto refused to attend a parliamentary hearing into allegations of regulatory interference.

=== Haiti ===
After the 2010 Haiti earthquake, Monsanto donated $255,000 for disaster relief and 60,000 seed sacks (475 tons) of hybrid (non-GM) corn and vegetable seeds worth $4 million. However, a Catholic Relief Services (CRS) rapid assessment of seed supply and demand for the five most common food security crops found that the Haitians had enough seed and recommended that imported seeds be introduced only on a small scale. Emmanuel Prophete, head of Haiti's Ministry of Agriculture's Service National Semencier (SNS), stated that SNS was not opposed to the hybrid maize seeds because they at least double yields. Louise Sperling, Principal Researcher at the International Center for Tropical Agriculture (CIAT) told HGW that she was not opposed to hybrids, but noted that most hybrids required extra water and better soils and that most of Haiti was not appropriate for hybrids.

Activists objected that some of the seeds were coated with the fungicides Maxim or thiram. In the United States, pesticides containing thiram are banned in home garden products because most home gardeners do not have adequate protection. Activists wrote that the coated seeds were handled in a dangerous manner by the recipients.

The donated seeds were sold at a reduced price in local markets. However, farmers feared that they were being given seeds that would "threaten local varieties".

== Public relations ==
Monsanto has engaged in various public relations campaigns to improve its image and public perception of some of its products. These include developing a relationship with scientist Richard Doll with respect to Agent Orange. Other campaigns include the joint funding with other biotech companies for the website GMO Answers.

=== Sponsorships ===
- Disneyland attractions, namely:
  - Hall of Chemistry (1955 to 1966)
  - Monsanto House of the Future (from 1957 to 1967)
  - Fashions and Fabrics through the Years (from 1965 to 1966)
  - Adventure Thru Inner Space (from 1967 to 1986)
- Monsanto has donated $10 million to the Missouri Botanical Garden in St. Louis in the 1970s, which named its 1998 plant science facility the 'Monsanto Center', which has been renamed in 2018 as the 'Bayer Center'.
- Field Museum
  - Gregor Mendel exhibit and "Underground Adventures" since 2011 "about the importance and fragility of the ecosystem within soil".
  - "Monsanto Environmental Education Initiative", led by Gregory M. Mueller
  - Chair of the Department of Botany and Associate Curator of Mycology
  - Staff of the Field Museum, such as Curator Mark W. Westneat, attended Monsanto meetings
- Monsanto Insectarium, renamed in 2018 as the Bayer Insectarium, at the St. Louis Zoo, in St. Louis, Missouri.

=== University relationships ===
Monsanto was a major funder of science research at Washington University in St. Louis for many years. This research was highlighted by the Washington University/Monsanto Biomedical Research Agreement, which brought more than $100 million of research funding to the university. Washington University built the Monsanto Laboratory of the Life Sciences in 1965. In 2015, Monsanto gave Washington University's Institute for School Partnership a $1.94 million grant to help better teach students in STEM fields.

== Awards ==
In 2009 Monsanto was chosen as Forbes magazine's company of the year. In 2010 Swiss research firm Covalence rated Monsanto least ethical of 581 multinational corporations based on their EthicalQuote reputation tracking index which "aggregates thousands of positive and negative news items published by the media, companies, and stakeholders", without attempt to validate sources. The journal Science ranked Monsanto in its Top 20 Employers list between 2011 and 2014. In 2012, it described the company as "innovative leader in the industry", "makes changes needed" and "does important quality research". Monsanto executive Robert Fraley won the World Food Prize for "breakthrough achievements in founding, developing, and applying modern agricultural biotechnology".

== Documentaries ==
- The Corporation
- Bitter Seeds
- Food, Inc.
- The Future of Food
- The World According to Monsanto

== See also ==
- Biological patents in the United States
- DuPont Pioneer
- Genetically modified food controversies
- Industrial Bio-Test Laboratories
- Temporal analysis of products

== Bibliography ==
- Ehrlich, Walter (1997). Zion in the Valley, 1807-1907: Volume I, The Jewish Community of St. Louis. University of Missouri Press. ISBN 0-8262-1098-8.
- Forrestal, Dan J. (1977). Faith, Hope & $5000: The Story of Monsanto, Simon & Schuster, ISBN 0-671-22784-X.
- Pechlaner, Gabriela, Corporate Crops: Biotechnology, Agriculture, and the Struggle for Control, University of Texas Press, 2012, ISBN 0292739451
- Robin, Marie-Monique, The World According to Monsanto: Pollution, Corruption, and the Control of the World's Food Supply, New Press, 2009, ISBN 1595584269
- Spears, Ellen Griffith, Baptized in PCBs: Race, Pollution, and Justice in an All-American Town, The University of North Carolina Press, 2014, ISBN 1469611716.
- Shiva, Vandana, Stolen Harvest: The Hijacking of the Global Food Supply, South End Press, 2000, ISBN 0896086070.
