= Agracetus =

Soybean transformation laboratory

The Agracetus Campus of Monsanto Company was a soybean transformation laboratory. It had over 21,700 employees worldwide, and an annual revenue of US$11.365 billion reported for 2008.

The first successful genetically engineered crop ever produced for the commercial market was the Roundup Ready soybean, produced at Agracetus in 1991, and was one of fourteen successful transformation events. Scientists there used gold bead gene transfer technology coupled with the β-Glucuronidase reporter gene to produce the plant. The actual gun that shot the gold beads and produced the genetic modifications is now owned by the Smithsonian museum in Washington, DC.

Every Roundup Ready soybean in the world has a relative which was genetically transformed at Agracetus. 80% of the world's soybeans are Roundup Ready.

Agracetus was founded in 1981 as Cetus Corporation. Acquired by Monsanto in 1996, the research and development facility was located 8 miles (13 km) west of Madison in the city of Middleton, Wisconsin, on 4.5 acres (18,000 m^{2}). The site had 100,000 square feet (9,300 m^{2}) of research space, 35,000 square feet (3,300 m^{2}) of greenhouse space, about 75 employees, and ten laboratories. Output of genetically modified soy plants is many thousands of transformation events per year.

Genetically modified cotton and genetically modified rice is also an important effort at Agracetus.

Monsanto closed the facility in 2016 when it centralized research to its headquarters in St Louis. They then donated the lab buildings to the University of Wisconsin–Madison.
