= Delta & Pine Land Company of Mississippi =

American seed company

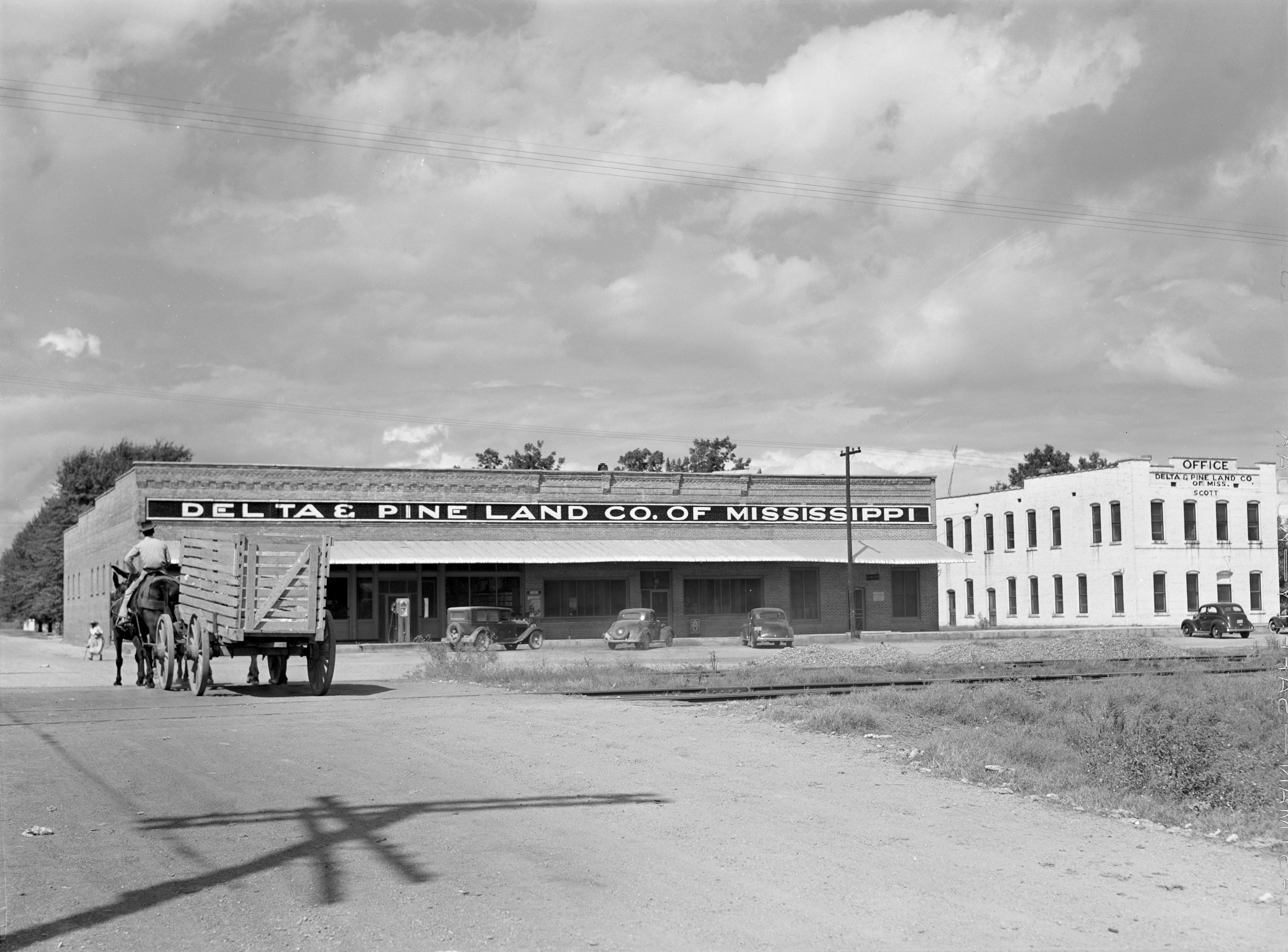
- Offices of Delta & Pine Land Company in 1939
- Industry: Agribusiness
- Founded: 1919
- Headquarters: Scott, Mississippi, United States
- Products: Cotton and soybean seeds
- Parent: Bayer (2018)

Delta & Pine Land Company was initially chartered in Mississippi in 1886 as a land speculation company, but was inactive until 1919, when a British textile company acquired the name. In the 1920s and 1930s, the company operated one of the largest cotton plantations in the Mississippi Delta, with headquarters in Scott, Mississippi. In the latter half of the 20th century, the company divested its farm lands, concentrated on research and development of cotton and soybean seeds, and became world-renowned for its development of Deltapine cotton varieties.

== History ==
The original Delta and Pine Land (D&PL) Company was chartered in 1886 to sell farm and timber land in the state of Mississippi, under laws that allowed almost unlimited land holdings by a single company. State laws were later changed to restrict land acquisition and ownership, but these laws did not apply retroactively to companies that were grandfathered in under older laws.

In 1911, Fine Cotton Spinners’ and Doublers’ Association Ltd. (FCSDA) of Manchester, England, purchased large tracts of land—38,000 acres (15,000 ha)—in the Mississippi Delta for cotton production. In order to comply with state law regarding land ownership, FCSDA created three companies—Lake Vista Plantation Company and Triumph Plantation Company owned land, while Mississippi Delta Planting Company leased the land and operated it as one unit. In 1919, FCSDA acquired the inactive charter of D&PL, and merged its three smaller companies under that title with headquarters in Memphis, Tennessee. Following the Mississippi River Flood in 1927 which destroyed the crops and scattered black sharecroppers, D&PL moved its headquarters to Scott, Mississippi under the leadership of Oscar Goodbar Johnston as its president in 1929. The 38,000 acre plantation supplied half shares to their black tenants, supplying seed, mules, work implements, housing in exchange for labor to increase organizational efficiency as well as created a police force, schools, and social welfare programs which were paternalistic in nature. The roughly 1,000 black tenant labor force cultivated six to eight acres per person in their family and were able to purchase goods from the company store account and were provided incentives for work outside of their allotted acreage.

By 1931, D&PL was on the brink of bankruptcy as the operator of the largest cotton plantation in the U.S., with more than 9,000 acres (3,600 ha) under cultivation and consolidated the companies in hopes of a better financial future but the price of cotton continued to drop. Johnston was able to bring D&PL back from the brink of collapse with strategic placements in the Department of Agriculture working on policy including New Deal cotton programs. The average yield for cotton in the 1920s was less than 200 lb (91 kg) per acre (0.4 ha), but D&PL was producing an average of 650 lb (290 kg) of cotton fiber per acre (0.4 ha) and 980 lb (440 kg) of seed by the 1930s. In 1936, they were the largest cotton plantation in the world and created controversy when Republican Senator Arthur Vandenberg discovered that they were receiving large federal benefit checks from the Agricultural Adjustment Administration (AAA) and that president Johnston was also a ranking official of AAA. A resolution was later passed to ensure the public's right-to-know the recipients of AAA federal benefits and the payment system was revised by Congress. By the mid-1930s D&PL company life had attracted international attention with many agriculturalists, journalists, and universities visiting to learn how it operated profitably. The farm gained further praise from the Tuskegee Institute in 1942. D&PL introduced their Deltapine cotton variety in 1942. After World War II, D&PL cotton varieties were being planted throughout the southern U.S., from Texas to North Carolina.

During the 1960s-1970s, D&PL began expanding into the western U.S., with offices in California, Arizona, and Texas. New cotton varieties were bred specifically for the drier climates, typical in the western U.S. states.

In 1964, FCSDA was acquired by Courtaulds, another British textile company. And in 1978, Courtaulds sold D&PL, in a leveraged buyout, to U.S. investors (Southwide, Inc. of Memphis). During the years that followed, most of the D&PL farm acreage was sold and the company concentrated on research and development of improved varieties of cotton and soybean seeds.

== Research ==
D&PL became the world’s largest cotton breeder, doing business in the U.S and in 18 other countries. In its cotton breeding research, D&PL was able to develop gene pools that produced cotton varieties of benefit to both cotton farmers, through increased yields, and textile manufacturers, through enhanced fiber traits.

Other research successes included development of early maturing varieties, transgenic row-crop seeds, and the first Roundup Ready cotton seeds. By the mid-1980s, D&PL was marketing ten varieties of cotton seeds and six varieties of soybean seeds.

In the 1990s, research between D&PL and the U.S. Department of Agriculture resulted in three U.S. patents on terminator seed technology. The first patent (Number 5723765) was issued on March 3, 1998, which patented three genes which together cause seed to be sterile unless treated with a proprietary spray, dubbed a "technology protection system." After the announcement, D&PL stock rose sharply and it was anticipated that USDA profits would increase dramatically. Advocates claimed that the technology restricted the introduction of genetically modified plants into nature by causing second generation seeds to be sterile and controlling genetics would be good for food production. The opposing point of view was that farmers who used terminator seeds could no longer rely on saved seeds to produce subsequent crops which was a threat to food security and biodiversity. The patent also marked the first time food crops, particularly staple crops, could enter into the hands of private monopolies.

== Acquisition ==
During the 1990s, D&PL had entered into successful research ventures with Monsanto. In 1998, Monsanto agreed to merge with D&PL, but the agreement collapsed under antitrust scrutiny by the Department of Justice. By 2006, antitrust concerns were reduced because of changing market conditions and competition from Bayer CropScience. Subsequently, Monsanto made an offer to buy D&PL, and in June 2007, D&PL became a wholly owned subsidiary of Monsanto.

In September 2016, Monsanto agreed to a takeover offer by Bayer, pending regulatory approval. On June 7, 2018, Bayer completed its acquisition of Monsanto following approval by the European Union on March 21, 2018, and the United States on May 29, 2018.
