= List of varieties of genetically modified maize =

This is a partial list of varieties of maize that have been modified.

== BASF ==
- DK404SR is a Cyclohexanedione herbicide tolerance maize under license from BASF Inc.

== Bayer CropScience ==
=== Plant Genetic Systems ===
StarLink is a Cry9C Bt corn produced by Plant Genetic Systems.

== Monsanto ==
- MON 802 is an Insect Resistant maize under license from Monsanto Company. Corn line MON802 was developed through genetic modification to be tolerant to glyphosate herbicide and protect the plant from the European corn borer (Ostrinia nubilalis) (the Bt trait).
- MON 809 is an Insect Resistant maize under license from Monsanto.
- MON 810 is an Insect resistant maize expressing the CryIAc protein for lepidopteran insect pest protection. Under license from Monsanto.
- MON 832 is an herbicide tolerant maize under license from Monsanto.
- MON 863 is an Insect Resistant maize under license from Monsanto.
- MON-8746Ø-4 (MON87460) is a water use efficient maize under license from Monsanto produced for human consumption and livestock feed.
- MON-877Ø1-2 (MON87701) - Resistance to lepidopteran pests of soybean including velvetbean caterpillar (Anticarsia gemmatalis) and soybean looper (Pseudoplusia includens). Agrobacterium tumefaciens-mediated plant transformation.
- MON 88017 is an Insect resistant maize expressing the Cry3Bb1 protein for corn rootworm protection and the CP4 EPSPS protein for glyphosate tolerance. Under license from the Monsanto Company.
- MON 89034 is an Insect resistant maize expressing the cry1A.105 and cry2Ab proteins for lepidopteran insect pest protection. Under license from the Monsanto Company.

== Pioneer Hi-Bred International ==
- 3751IR is an Imidazolinone herbicide tolerance maize under license from Pioneer Hi-Bred International Inc.
- DP-ØØ4114-3 (4114) - Herbicide tolerant, glufosinate ammonium; Insect resistant, Coleoptera; Insect resistant, Lepidoptera.

== Syngenta ==
- EXP1910IT - Imidazolinone herbicide tolerance, specifically imazethapyr.
- SYN-EV176-9 (176) is an Insect Resistant and multiple herbicide resistant maize under license from Syngenta Seeds, Inc.
- SYN-BTO11-1, MON-OOO21-9 (BT11 × GA21) is an Insect Resistant and multiple herbicide resistant maize under license from Syngenta Seeds, Inc.
- SYN-BTO11-1, SYN-IR6O4-5 (BT11 × MIR604) is an Insect Resistant and multiple herbicide resistant maize under license from Syngenta Seeds, Inc.
- SYN-IR6O4-5 (MIR604) is an Insect Resistant maize under license from Syngenta Seeds, Inc.
- SYN-IR162-4 (MIR162) is an Insect Resistant maize under license from Syngenta Seeds, Inc.
- SYN-BTO11-1 (BT11 (X4334CBR, X4734CBR)) is an Insect Resistant and herbicide tolerant maize under license from Syngenta Seeds, Inc.
- SYN-BTO11-1, SYN-IR162-4, SYN-IR6O4-5 (BT11 × MIR162 × MIR604) is an Insect Resistant and multiple herbicide resistant maize under license from Syngenta Seeds, Inc.

== Multiple ==
1507 (or TC1507) is an insect resistant maize expressing the Cry1F protein for lepidopteran insect pest protection and the PAT protein for glufosinate ammonium tolerance as a breeding tool or weed control option. Under license from Pioneer Hi-Bred International Inc. and Mycogen.

59122 is an insect resistant maize expressing the Cry34Ab1 and Cry35Ab1 proteins for corn rootworm insect pest protection and the PAT protein for glufosinate ammonium tolerance as a breeding tool or weed control option. Under license from Pioneer Hi-Bred International Inc. and DOW AgroSciences LLC.
