= Genetically modified food in the European Union =

Logo of the European Food Safety Authority

Genetic engineering in the European Union has varying degrees of regulation.

== Regulation ==
=== History ===
Until the 1990s, Europe's regulation was less strict than in the United States, one turning point being cited as the export of the United States' first GM-containing soy harvest in 1996. The GM soy made up about 2% of the total harvest at the time, and Eurocommerce and European food retailers required that it be separated. Although the European Commission (EC) did eventually relent, this sparked American concerns that Europe would soon become a tighter regulatory environment - it was conditioned on sale as processed products and never as seed. The Clinton Administration was widely urged to harmonize standards in its impending second term to guarantee an open European market. In 1998, the use of MON810, a Bt expressing maize conferring resistance to the European corn borer, was approved for commercial cultivation in Europe. Shortly thereafter, the EU enacted a de facto moratorium on new approvals of GMOs pending new regulatory laws passed in 2003.

Those new laws provided the EU with possibly the most stringent GMO regulations in the world. The European Food Safety Authority (EFSA) was created in 2002 with the primary goal of preventing future food crises in Europe. All GMOs, along with irradiated food, are considered "new food" and subject to extensive, case-by-case, science-based food evaluation by the EFSA. The criteria for authorization fall into four broad categories: "safety", "freedom of choice", "labelling" and "traceability". The EFSA reports to the European Commission (EC), which then drafts a proposal for granting or refusing the authorisation. This proposal is submitted to the Section on GM Food and Feed of the Standing Committee on the Food Chain and Animal Health; if accepted, it will be adopted by the EC or passed on to the Council of Agricultural Ministers. Once in the Council it has three months to reach a qualified majority for or against the proposal; if no majority is reached, the proposal is passed back to the EC, which will then adopt the proposal. However, even after authorization, individual EU member states can ban individual varieties under a 'safeguard clause' if there are "justifiable reasons" that the variety might cause harm to humans or the environment. The member state must then supply sufficient evidence that this is the case. The commission is obliged to investigate these cases and either overturn the original registrations or request the country to withdraw its temporary restriction. The laws of the EU also required that member nations establish coexistence regulations. In many cases, national coexistence regulations include minimum distances between fields of GM crops and non-GM crops. The distances for GM maize from non-GM maize for the six largest biotechnology countries are: France – 50 metres, Britain – 110 metres for grain maize and 80 for silage maize, Netherlands – 25 metres in general and 250 for organic or GM-free fields, Sweden – 15–50 metres, Finland – data not available, and Germany – 150 metres and 300 from organic fields. Larger minimum distance requirements discriminate against adoption of GM crops by smaller farms.

In 2006, the World Trade Organization concluded that the EU moratorium, which had been in effect from 1999 to 2004, had violated international trade rules. The moratorium had not affected previously approved crops. The only crop authorised for cultivation before the moratorium was Monsanto's MON 810. The next approval for cultivation was the Amflora potato for industrial applications in 2010 which was grown in Germany, Sweden and the Czech Republic that year.

The slow pace of approval was criticized as endangering European food safety although as of 2012, the EU had authorized the use of 48 genetically modified organisms. Most of these were for use in animal feed (it was reported in 2012 that the EU imports about 30 million tons a year of GM crops for animal consumption.), food or food additives. Of these, 26 were varieties of maize. In July 2012, the EU gave approval for an Irish trial cultivation of potatoes resistant to the blight that caused the Great Irish Famine.

The safeguard clause mentioned above has been applied by many member states in various circumstances, and in April 2011 there were 22 active bans in place across six member states: Austria, France, Germany, Luxembourg, Greece, and Hungary. However, on review many of these have been considered scientifically unjustified.

- In January 2005, the Hungarian government announced a ban on importing and planting of genetic modified maize seeds, which was subsequently authorized by the EU.
- In February 2008, the French government used the safeguard clause to ban the cultivation of MON810 after Senator Jean-François Le Grand, chairman of a committee set up to evaluate biotechnology, said there were "serious doubts" about the safety of the product (although this ban was declared illegal in 2011 by the European Court of Justice and the French Conseil d'État). The French farm ministry reinstated the ban in 2012, but this was rejected by the EFSA.
- In 2009 German Federal Minister Ilse Aigner announced an immediate halt to cultivation and marketing of MON810 maize under the safeguard clause.
- In March 2010, Bulgaria imposed a complete ban on genetically modified crop growing either commercially or for trials. The cabinet of Boyko Borisov initially imposed a five-year moratorium, but later extended this to a permanent ban after widespread public protests against the introduction of genetically modified crops in the country.
- In January 2013, Poland's government placed a ban on Monsanto's GM corn, MON 810. It launched a communication campaign with farmers, announcing they will now be strictly monitoring farms for GM corn crops. Poland is the eighth EU member to ban the production of GMOs even though they have been approved by European Food Safety Authority. Europe is not officially against the use of GM crops when it comes to laboratory research, and they are working to regulate the field.

In 2012, the European Food Safety Authority (EFSA) Panel on Genetically Modified Organisms (GMO) released a "Scientific opinion addressing the safety assessment of plants developed through cisgenesis and intragenesis" in a response to a request from the European Commission. The opinion was that while "the frequency of unintended changes may differ between breeding techniques and their occurrence cannot be predicted and needs to be assessed case by case", "similar hazards can be associated with cisgenic and conventionally bred plants, while novel hazards can be associated with intragenic and transgenic plants." In other words, cisgenic approaches, which introduce genes from the same species, should be considered similar in risk to conventional breeding approaches, whilst transgenic plants can come with new hazards.

In 2014, a panel of experts set up by the UK Biotechnology and Biological Sciences Research Council argued that "A regulatory system based on the characteristics of a novel crop, by whatever method it has been produced, would provide a more effective and robust regulation than current EU processes, which consider new crop varieties differently depending on the method used to produce them." They said that new forms of "genome editing" allow targeting specific sites and making precise changes in the DNA of crops. In the future it would become increasingly difficult if not impossible to tell which method has been used (conventional breeding or genetic engineering) to produce a novel crop. They proposed that existing EU regulatory system should be replaced with a more logical system like that used for new medicines.

In 2015, Germany, Poland, France, Scotland and several other member states opted out of cultivating GMO crops in their territory.

A Eurobarometer survey has indicated that "level of concern" about genetically engineered food in Europe has decreased significantly, from 69% in 2010 to 27% in 2019.

Around one quarter (26%) of the EU citizens indicate the presence of genetically modified ingredients in food or drinks as a concern in 2022 while only a smaller proportions (8%), the use of new biotechnology in food production, i.e. genome editing

=== Labeling and traceability ===
The regulations concerning the import and sale of GMOs for human and animal consumption grown outside the EU involve providing freedom of choice to the farmers and consumers. All food (including processed food) or feed which contains greater than 0.9% of approved GMOs must be labelled. On two occasions, GMOs unapproved by the EC have arrived in the EU and been forced to return to their port of origin. The first was in 2006 when a shipment of rice from America containing an experimental GMO variety (LLRice601) not meant for commercialisation arrived at Rotterdam. The second in 2009 when trace amounts of a GMO maize approved in the US were found in a "non-GM" soy flour cargo.

The coexistence of GM and non-GM crops has raised significant concern in many European countries and so EU law also requires that all GM food be traceable to its origin, and that all food with GM content greater than 0.9% be labelled. Due to high demand from European consumers for freedom of choice between GM and non-GM foods. EU regulations require measures to avoid mixing of foods and feed produced from GM crops and conventional or organic crops, which can be done via isolation distances or biological containment strategies. (Unlike the US, European countries require labeling of GM food.) European research programs such as Co-Extra, Transcontainer, and SIGMEA are investigating appropriate tools and rules for traceability. The OECD has introduced a "unique identifier" which is given to any GMO when it is approved, which must be forwarded at every stage of processing. Such measures are generally not used in North America because they are very costly and the industry admits of no safety-related reasons to employ them. The EC has issued guidelines to allow the co-existence of GM and non-GM crops through buffer zones (where no GM crops are grown). These are regulated by individual countries, and vary from 15 metres in Sweden to 800 metres in Luxembourg. All food (including processed food) or feed which contains greater than 0.9% of approved GMOs must be labelled.

=== Scope ===
In its regulations the European Union considers genetically modified organisms only to be food and feed for all intents and practical purposes, in difference to the definition of genetically modified organisms which encompasses animals.

=== Approach ===
The EU uses the precautionary principle, demanding a pre-market authorisation for any GMO to enter the market and a post-market environmental monitoring. Both the European Food Safety Authority (EFSA) and the member states author a risk assessment. This assessment must show that the food or feed is safe for human and animal health and the environment "under its intended conditions of use".

As of 2010, the EU treats all genetically modified crops (GMO crops), along with irradiated food as "new food". They are subject to extensive, case-by-case, science-based food evaluation by the European Food Safety Authority (EFSA). This agency reports to the European Commission, which then drafts proposals for granting or refusing authorisation. Each proposal is submitted to the "Section on GM Food and Feed of the Standing Committee on the Food Chain and Animal Health". If accepted, it is either adopted by the EC or passed on to the Council of Agricultural Ministers. The council has three months to reach a qualified majority for or against the proposal. If no majority is reached, the proposal is passed back to the EC, which then adopts the proposal.

The EFSA uses independent scientific research to advise the European Commission on how to regulate different foods in order to protect consumers and the environment. For GMOs, the EFSA's risk assessment includes molecular characterization, potential toxicity and potential environmental impact. Each GMO must be reassessed every 10 years. In addition, applicants who wish to cultivate or process GMOs must provide a detailed surveillance plan for after authorization. This ensures that the EFSA will know if risk to consumers or the environment heightens and that they can then act to lowed the risk or deauthorize the GMO.

As of September 2014, 49 GMO crops, consisting of eight GM cottons, 28 GM maizes, three GM oilseed rapes, seven GM soybeans, one GM sugar beet, one GM bacterial biomass, and one GM yeast biomass have been authorised.

=== Review of authorisation ===
Member States of the EU may invoke a safeguard clause to temporarily restrict or prohibit use and/or sale of a GMO crop within their territory if they have justifiable reasons to consider that an approved GMO crop may be a risk to human health or the environment. The EC is obliged to investigate, and either overturn the original registrations or ask the country to withdraw its temporary restriction. By 2012, seven countries had submitted safeguard clauses. The EC investigated and rejected those from six countries ("...the scientific evidence currently available did not invalidate the original risk assessments for the products in question...") and one, the UK, withdrew.

=== Import rules ===
The EC Directorate-general for agriculture and rural development states that the regulations concerning the import and sale of GMOs for human and animal consumption grown outside the EU provide freedom of choice to farmers and consumers. All food (including processed food) or feed which contains greater than 0.9% of approved GMOs must be labelled. As of 2010, GMOs unapproved by the EC had been found twice and returned to their port of origin: First in 2006 when a shipment of rice from the U.S. containing an experimental GMO variety (LLRice601) not meant for commercialisation arrived at Rotterdam, the second time in 2009, when trace amounts of a GMO maize approved in the US were found in a non-GM soy flour cargo. In 2012, the EU imported about 30 million tons of GM crops for animal consumption.

== Adoption of GMO crops ==
As of 2014 Spain has been the largest producer of GM crops in Europe with 137,000 hectares (340,000 acres) of GM maize planted in 2013 equaling 20% of Spain's maize production.

Smaller amounts were produced in the Czech Republic, Slovakia, Portugal, Romania and Poland. France, Italy, and Germany are the major opponents of genetically modified food in Europe, although Germany has approved Amflora a potato modified with higher levels of starch for industrial purposes. In addition to France, Italy, and Germany, other European countries that placed bans on the cultivation and sale of GMOs include Austria, Hungary, Greece, and Luxembourg. Poland has also tried to institute a ban, with backlash from the European Commission. Bulgaria effectively banned cultivation of genetically modified organisms on 18 March 2010.

In 2010, Austria, Bulgaria, Cyprus, Hungary, Ireland, Latvia, Lithuania, Malta, Slovenia and the Netherlands wrote a joint paper requesting that individual countries should have the right to decide whether to cultivate GM crops. By the year 2010, the only GMO food crop with approval for cultivation in Europe was MON 810, a Bt expressing maize conferring resistance to the European corn borer that gained approval in 1998.

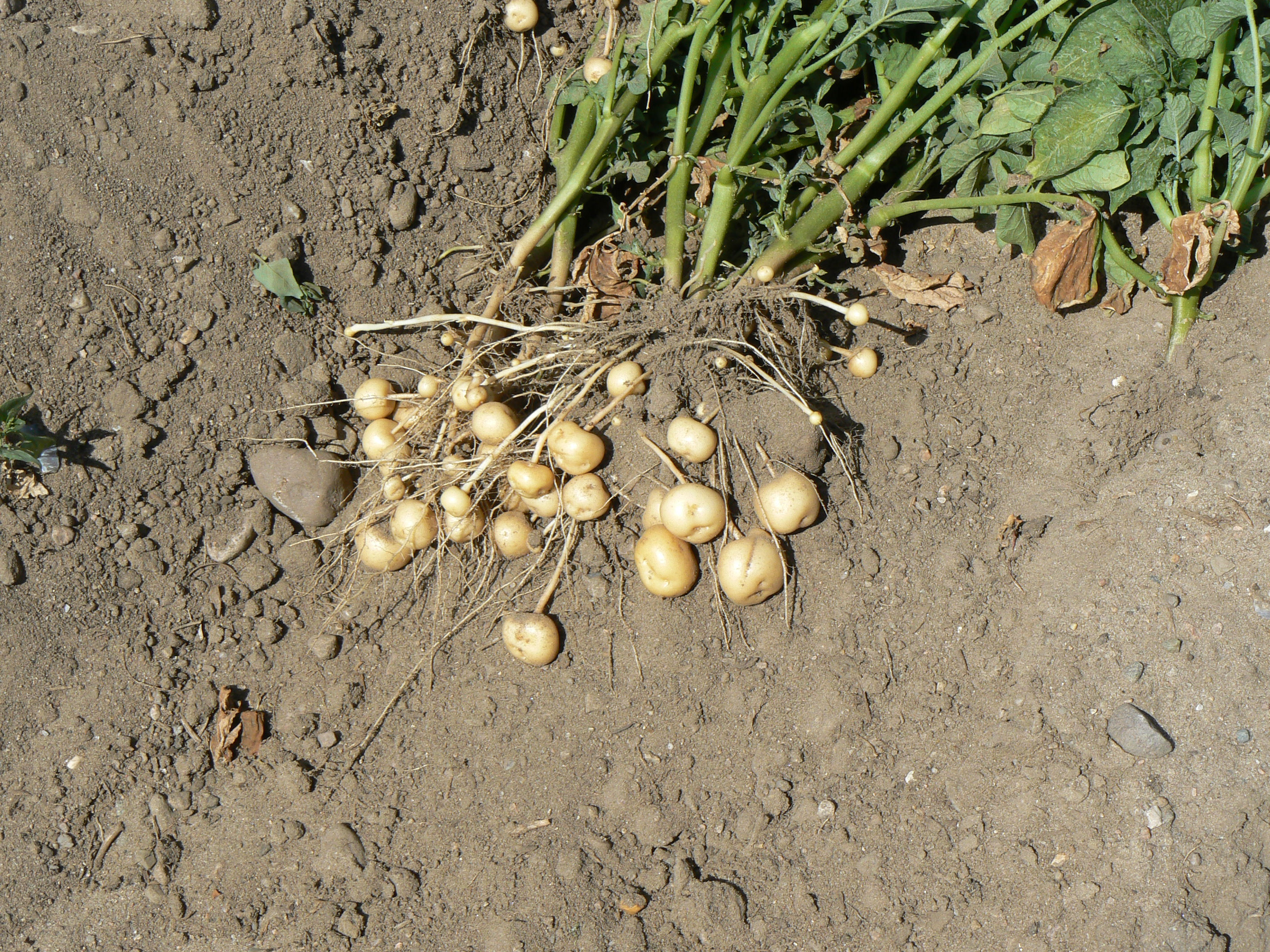
Amflora potato field in Zepkow, Germany

In March 2010 a second GMO, a potato called Amflora, was approved for cultivation for industrial applications in the EU by the European Commission and was grown in Germany, Sweden and the Czech Republic that year. Amflora was withdrawn from the EU market in 2012, and in 2013 its approval was annulled by an EU court.

Fearing that gene flow could occur between related crops, the EC issued new guidelines in 2010 regarding the co-existence of GM and non-GM crops.

Co-existence is regulated by the use of buffer zones and isolation distances between the GM and non-GM crops. The guidelines are not binding and each Member State can implement its own regulations, which has resulted in buffer zones ranging from 15 metres (Sweden) to 800 metres (Luxembourg). Member States may also designate GM-free zones, effectively allowing them to ban cultivation of GM crops in their territory without invoking a safeguard clause.

== Implementation in the Member States and in Switzerland ==
=== Bulgaria ===
In October 2015, Bulgaria announced it has opted out of growing genetically modified crops, effectively banning the cultivation of different types of GMO corn and soybeans.

=== France ===
France adopted the EU laws on growing GMOs in 2007 and was fined €10 million by the European Court of Justice for the six-year delay in implementing the laws. In February 2008, the French government used the safeguard clause to ban the cultivation of MON 810 after Senator Jean-François Le Grand, chairman of a committee to evaluate biotechnology, said there were "serious doubts" about the safety of the product. Twelve scientists and two economists on the committee accused Le Grand of misrepresenting the report and said they did not have "serious doubts", although questions remained concerning the impact of Bt-maize on health and the environment. The EFSA reviewed studies the French government had submitted to back up its claim, and concluded that there was no new evidence to undermine its prior safety findings and considered the decision "scientifically unfounded". The High Council for Biotechnology subcommittee dealing with economic, ethical and social aspects recommended an additional "GMO-free" label for anything containing less than 0.1% GMO which is due to come in late 2010. In 2011, the European Court of Justice and the French Conseil d'État ruled that the French farm ministry ban of MON 810 was illegal, as it failed "to give proof of the existence of a particularly high level of risk for the health and the environment".

On 17 September 2015, the French government announced it would effectively continue to ban GMO crops by enacting an "opt-out" provision, previously agreed to for the 28 EU member states in March 2015, by asking the European Commission for France to extend the GMO ban on nine additional strains of maize. The policy announcement was made simultaneously by the French farm and environment ministries.

=== Germany ===
In April 2009, German Federal Minister Ilse Aigner announced an immediate halt to cultivation and marketing of MON 810 maize under the safeguard clause. The ban was based on "expert opinion" that suggested there were reasonable grounds to believe that MON 810 maize presents a danger to the environment. Three French scientists reviewing the scientific evidence used to justify the ban concluded that it did not use a case-by-case approach, confused potential hazards with proven risks and ignored the meta-knowledge on Bt expressing maize, instead focusing on selected individual studies.

In August 2015, Germany announced its intention to ban genetically modified crops.

=== Northern Ireland ===
In September 2015, Northern Ireland announced a ban on genetically modified crops.

=== Romania ===
Romania grew GM soybeans in 1999, increasing the crop's yield by 30%, permitting the export of excess product. When the country joined the European Union in 2007 it was no longer allowed to grow the GM crop, resulting in the total area planted in soybeans dropping by 70%. The next year, this produced a trade deficit of €117.4m for purchase of replacement products. Romanian farmers have been very much in favour of relegalisation of GM soy.

=== Switzerland ===
In 1992, Switzerland voted in favour of the introduction of an article about assisted reproductive technologies and genetic engineering in the Swiss Federal Constitution. In 1995, Switzerland introduced regulations requiring labelling of food containing genetically modified organisms. It was one of the first countries to introduce labelling requirements for GMOs. In 2003, the Federal Assembly adopted the "Federal Act on Non-Human Gene Technology".

A federal popular initiative introducing a moratorium on genetically modified organisms in the Swiss agriculture was introduced from 2005 to 2010. Later, the Swiss parliament extended this moratorium to 2013. Between 2007 and 2011, the Swiss Government funded thirty projects to investigate the risks and benefits of GMOs. These projects concluded that there were no clear health or environmental dangers associated with planting GMOs. However, they also concluded that there was little economic incentive for farmers to adopt GMOs in Switzerland. The Swiss parliament then extended the moratorium to 2017, and then to 2021.

As of 2016, six cantons (Bern, Fribourg, Geneva, Jura, Ticino and Vaud) have introduced laws against genetically modified organisms in agriculture. More than one hundred communes have declared themselves free of genetically modified organisms. The cantons of Switzerland perform tests to assess the presence of genetically modified organisms in foodstuffs. In 2008, 3% of the tested samples contained detectable amounts of GMOs. In 2012, 12.1% of the samples analysed contained detectable amounts of GMOs (including 2.4% of GMOs forbidden in Switzerland). All the samples tested (except one) contained less than 0.9% of GMOs, which is the threshold that imposes labelling indicating the presence of GMOs in food.

=== Scotland ===
In August 2015, the Scottish government announced that it would "shortly submit a request that Scotland is excluded from any European consents for the cultivation of GM crops, including the variety of genetically modified maize already approved and six other GM crops that are awaiting authorisation".

== See also ==
- Regulation of genetic engineering
- European Food Safety Authority
