= Detection of genetically modified organisms =

Identification of genetically modified organisms

The detection of genetically modified organisms in food or feed is possible by biochemical means. It can either be qualitative, showing which genetically modified organism (GMO) is present, or quantitative, measuring in which amount a certain GMO is present. Being able to detect a GMO is an important part of GMO labeling, as without detection methods the traceability of GMOs would rely solely on documentation.

== Polymerase chain reaction (PCR) ==
The polymerase chain reaction (PCR) is a biochemistry and molecular biology technique for isolating and exponentially amplifying a fragment of DNA, via enzymatic replication, without using a living organism. It enables the detection of specific strands of DNA by making millions of copies of a target genetic sequence. The target sequence is essentially photocopied at an exponential rate, and simple visualisation techniques can make the millions of copies easy to see.

The method works by pairing the targeted genetic sequence with custom designed complementary bits of DNA called primers. In the presence of the target sequence, the primers match with it and trigger a chain reaction. DNA replication enzymes use the primers as docking points and start doubling the target sequences. The process is repeated over and over again by sequential heating and cooling until doubling and redoubling has multiplied the target sequence several million-fold. The millions of identical fragments are then purified in a slab of gel, dyed, and can be seen with UV light. It is not prone to contamination. Irrespective of the variety of methods used for DNA analysis, only PCR in its different formats has been widely applied in GMO detection/analysis and generally accepted for regulatory compliance purposes. Detection methods based on DNA rely on the complementarity of two strands of DNA double helix that hybridize in a sequence-specific manner. The DNA of GMO consists of several elements that govern its functioning. The elements are promoter sequence, structural gene and stop sequence for the gene.

=== Quantitative detection ===
Quantitative PCR (Q-PCR) is used to measure the quantity of a PCR product (preferably real-time, QRT-PCR). It is the method of choice to quantitatively measure amounts of transgene DNA in a food or feed sample. Q-PCR is commonly used to determine whether a DNA sequence is present in a sample and the number of its copies in the sample. The method with currently the highest level of accuracy is quantitative real-time PCR. QRT-PCR methods use fluorescent dyes, such as Sybr Green, or fluorophore-containing DNA probes, such as TaqMan, to measure the amount of amplified product in real time. If the targeted genetic sequence is unique to a certain GMO, a positive PCR test proves that the GMO is present in the sample.

=== Qualitative detection ===
Whether or not a GMO is present in a sample can be tested by Q-PCR, but also by multiplex PCR. Multiplex PCR uses multiple, unique primer sets within a single PCR reaction to produce amplicons of varying sizes specific to different DNA sequences, i.e. different transgenes. By targeting multiple genes at once, additional information may be gained from a single test run that otherwise would require several times the reagents and more time to perform. Annealing temperatures for each of the primer sets must be optimized to work correctly within a single reaction, and amplicon sizes, i.e., their base pair length, should be different enough to form distinct bands when visualized by gel electrophoresis.

== Event-specific vs. construct-specific detection ==
When producers, importers or authorities test a sample for the unintended presence of GMOs, they usually do not know which GMO to expect. While EU authorities prefer an event-specific approach to this problem, US authorities rely on construct-specific test schemes.

=== Event-specific detection ===
An event-specific detection searches for the presence of a DNA sequence unique to a certain GMO, usually the junction between the transgene and the organism's original DNA. This approach is ideal to precisely identify a GMO, yet highly similar GMOs will pass completely unnoticed. Event-specific detection is PCR-based.

=== Construct-specific detection ===
The construct-specific detection methods can either be DNA or protein based. DNA based detection looks for a part of the foreign DNA inserted in a GMO. For technical reasons, certain DNA sequences are shared by several GMOs. Protein-based methods detect the product of the transgene, for example the Bt toxin. Since different GMOs may produce the same protein, construct-specific detection can test a sample for several GMOs in one step, but is unable to tell precisely which of the similar GMOs are present. Especially in the US, protein-based detection is used for the construct-specific approach.

== Shortcomings of current detection methods ==
Currently, it is highly unlikely that the presence of unexpected or even unknown GMOs will be detected, since either the DNA sequence of the transgene or its product, the protein, must be known for detection. In addition, even testing for known GMOs is time-consuming and costly, as current reliable detection methods can test for only one GMO at a time. Therefore, research programmes such as Co-Extra are developing improved and alternative testing methods, for example DNA microarrays.

== Alternative detection methods ==
=== Improving PCR based detection ===
Improving PCR based detection of GMOs is a further goal of the European research programme Co-Extra. Research is now underway to develop multiplex PCR methods that can simultaneously detect many different transgenic lines. Another major challenge is the increasing prevalence of transgenic crops with stacked traits. This refers to transgenic cultivars derived from crosses between transgenic parent lines, combining the transgenic traits of both parents. One GM maize variety now awaiting a decision by the European Commission, MON863 x MON810 x NK603, has three stacked traits. It is resistant to an herbicide and to two different kinds of insect pests. Some combined testing methods could give results that would triple the actual GM content of a sample containing this GMO.

=== Detecting unknown GMOs ===
Almost all transgenic plants contain a few common building blocks that make unknown GMOs easier to find. Even though detecting a novel gene in a GMO can be like finding a needle in a haystack, the fact that the needles are usually similar makes it much easier. To trigger gene expression, scientists couple the gene they want to add with what is known as a transcription promoter. The high-performing 35S promoter is a common feature to many GMOs. In addition, the stop signal for gene transcription in most GMOs is often the same: the NOS terminator. Researchers now compile a set of genetic sequences characteristic of GMOs. After genetic elements characteristic of GMOs are selected, methods and tools are developed for detecting them in test samples. Approaches being considered include microarrays and anchor PCR profiling.

=== Near infrared fluorescence (NIR) ===
Near infrared fluorescence (NIR) detection is a method that can reveal what kinds of chemicals are present in a sample based on their physical properties. By hitting a sample with near infrared light, chemical bonds in the sample vibrate and re-release the light energy at a wavelength characteristic for a specific molecule or chemical bond. It is not yet known if the differences between GMOs and conventional plants are large enough to detect with NIR imaging. Although the technique would require advanced machinery and data processing tools, a non-chemical approach could have some advantages such as lower costs and enhanced speed and mobility.

== Controls by country ==
=== Switzerland ===
The Cantons of Switzerland perform tests to assess the presence of genetically modified organisms in foodstuffs. In 2008, 3% of the tested samples contained detectable amounts of GMOs. In 2012, 12% of the samples analysed contained detectable amounts of GMOs (including 2.4% of GMOs forbidden in Switzerland). Except one, all the samples tested contained less than 0.9% of GMOs; which is the threshold that impose labelling indicating the presence of GMOs.

== See also ==
- StarLink corn recall
