= Transplastomic plant =

Plastid examples

A transplastomic plant is a genetically modified plant in which genes are inactivated, modified or new foreign genes are inserted into the DNA of plastids like the chloroplast instead of nuclear DNA.

Currently, the majority of transplastomic plants are a result of chloroplast manipulation due to poor expression in other plastids. However, the technique has been successfully applied to the chromoplasts of tomatoes.

Chloroplasts in plants are thought to have originated from an engulfing event of a photosynthetic bacteria (cyanobacterial ancestor) by a eukaryote. There are many advantages to chloroplast DNA manipulation because of its bacterial origin. For example, the ability to introduce multiple genes (operons) in a single step instead of many steps and the simultaneous expression of many genes with its bacterial gene expression system. Other advantages include the ability to obtain organic products like proteins at a high concentration and the fact that production of these products will not be affected by epigenetic regulation.

The reason for product synthesis at high concentrations is because a single plant cell can potentially carry up to 100 chloroplasts. If all these plastids are transformed, all of them can express the introduced foreign genes. This is may be advantageous compared to transformation of the nucleus, because the nucleus typically contains only one or two copies of the gene.

The advantages provided by chloroplast DNA manipulation has seen growing interest into this field of research and development, particularly in agricultural and pharmaceutical applications. However, there are some limitations in chloroplast DNA manipulation, such as the inability to manipulate cereal crop DNA material and poor expression of foreign DNA in non- green plastids as mentioned before. In addition, the lack of post- translational modification capability like glycosylation in plastids may make some human- related protein expression difficult. Nevertheless, much progress has been made into plant transplastomics, for example, the production of edible vaccines for Tetanus by using a transplastomic tobacco plant.

== Transformation and selection procedure ==
=== Gene construct ===
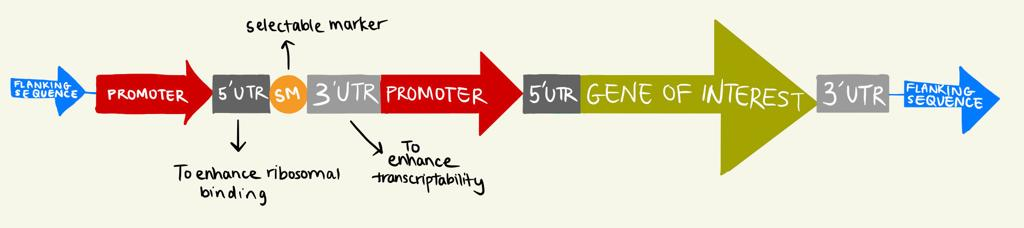
Plant gene cassette schematic for plant transplastomics

The first requirement for transplastomic plant generation is to have a suitable gene construct that can be introduced into a plastid like a chloroplast in the form of an E. coli plasmid vector. There are several key features of a suitable gene cassette including but not limited to (1) selectable marker (2) flanking sequences (3) gene of interest (4) promoter sequences (5) 5' UTR (6) 3' UTR (7) intercistronic elements. The selectable marker typically tends to be an antibiotic resistant gene, which would give the plant cell the ability to tolerate being grown on antibiotic containing agar plates. Flanking sequences are crucial for introduction of the gene construct at precise predetermined points of the plastid genome through homologous recombination. The gene of interests introduced have many different applications and can range from pest resistance genes to vaccine antigen production. Intercistronic elements (IEE) are important for facilitating high levels of gene expression if multiple genes are introduced in the form of an operon. Finally, the 5' UTR and 3' UTR enhances ribosomal binding and increases transcript stability respectively.

=== Transformation and selection ===
The most common method for plastid transformations is biolistics: Small gold or tungsten particles are coated with the plasmid vector and shot into young plant cells or plant embryos, penetrating multiple cell layers and into the plastid. There will then be a homologous recombination event between the shot plasmid vector and the plastid's genome, hopefully resulting in a stable insertion of the gene cassette into the plastid. Whilst the transformation efficiency is lower than in agrobacterial mediated transformation, which is also common in plant genetic engineering, particle bombardment is especially suitable for chloroplast transformation. Other transformation methods include the use of polyethylene glycol (PEG)- mediated transformation, which involves the removal of the plant cell wall in order to expose the "naked" plant cell to the foreign genetic material for transformation in the presence of PEG. PEG- mediated transformation however, is notoriously time-consuming, very technical and labor-intensive as it requires the removal of the cell wall which is a key protective structural component of the plant cell. Interestingly, a paper released in 2018 has described a successful plastid transformation of the chloroplast from the microalgae species N. oceanica and C. reinhardtii through electroporation. Whilst no study has been attempted yet for plastid transformation of higher plants using electroporation, this could be an interesting area of study for the future.

In order to persist and be stably maintained in the cell, a plasmid DNA molecule must contain an origin of replication, which allows it to be replicated in the cell independently of the chromosome. When foreign DNA is first introduced to the plant tissue, not all chloroplasts will have successfully integrated the introduced genetic material. There will be a mixture of normal and transformed chloroplast within the plant cells. This mix of normal and transformed chloroplasts are defined to be "heteroplasmic" chloroplast population. Stable gene expression of the introduced gene requires a "homoplasmic" population of transformed chloroplasts in the plant cells, where all the chloroplasts in the plant cell has successfully integrated the foreign genetic material. Typically, homoplasmicity can be achieved and identified through multiple rounds of selection on antibiotics. This is where the transformed plant tissue are grown repeatedly on agar plates that contain antibiotics like spectinomycin. Only plant cells that have successfully integrated the gene cassette as shown above will be able to express the antibiotic resistance selectable marker and therefore grow normally on agar plates containing antibiotics. Plant tissue that do not grow normally will have a bleached appearance as the spectinomycin antibiotic inhibits the ribosomes in the plastids of the plant cell, thereby preventing maintenance of the chloroplast However, as heteroplasmic population of chloroplasts may still be able to grow on agar plates effectively, many rounds of antibiotic selection and regrowth are required to cultivate a plant tissue that is homoplasmic and stable. Generation of homoplasmic plant tissue is considered to be a major difficulty in transplastomics and incredibly time-consuming.

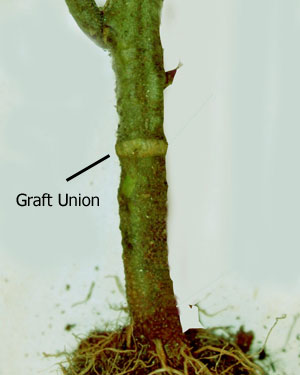
Example of a tomato plant grafting for agricultural purposes

=== Grafting ===
Some plant species such as Nicotiana tabacum are more receptive to transplastomics compared to members of the same genus such as Nicotiana glauca and Nicotiana benthamiana. An experiment conducted in 2012 highlighted the possibility of facilitating transplastomics for difficult plant species using grafting. Grafting occurs when two different plants are joined and continue to grow, this technique has been widely employed in agricultural applications and can even occur naturally in the wild. A transplastomic N. tabacum plant was engineered to have spectinomycin resistance and GFP fluorescence. Whilst the nuclear transgenic plants N. benthamiana and N. glauca were engineered to have kanamycin antibiotic resistance and YFP fluorescence. The transplastomic plant and the nuclear transgenic plants were then grafted unto each other and the grafted tissues were then analysed. Fluorescence microscopy and antibiotic selection on agar plates with both kanamycin and spectinomycin revealed that the grafted plant tissue had both transplastomics and nuclear transgene DNA material. This was further confirmed through PCR analysis. This study highlighted that plastids like the chloroplast are able to pass between cells across graft junctions and result in the transfer of genetic material between two different plant cell lines. This finding is significant as it provides an alternative pathway for generation of transplastomic plants for species that are not as easily transformed using our current experimental methodology as seen above.

=== Optimizing transgene expression ===
Inducible expression systems such as theoriboswitches and pentatricopeptide repeat proteins have been widely studied in an effort to control and modulate expression of transgene products in transplastomic plants. One big advantage in using inducible expression systems is to optimize concentration of transgene protein production. For example, young plants need to devote energy and resources into growth and development to become mature plants. Constitutive expression of the transgene would therefore be detrimental for plant growth and development, as it takes away valuable energy and resources to express the foreign gene construct instead. This would result in a poorly developed transplastomic plant with low product yield. Inducible expression of the transgene would overcome this limitation and allow the plant to mature fully like a normal wildtype plant before it is induced chemically to begin production of the transgene which can then be harvested.

== Biological containment and agricultural coexistence ==
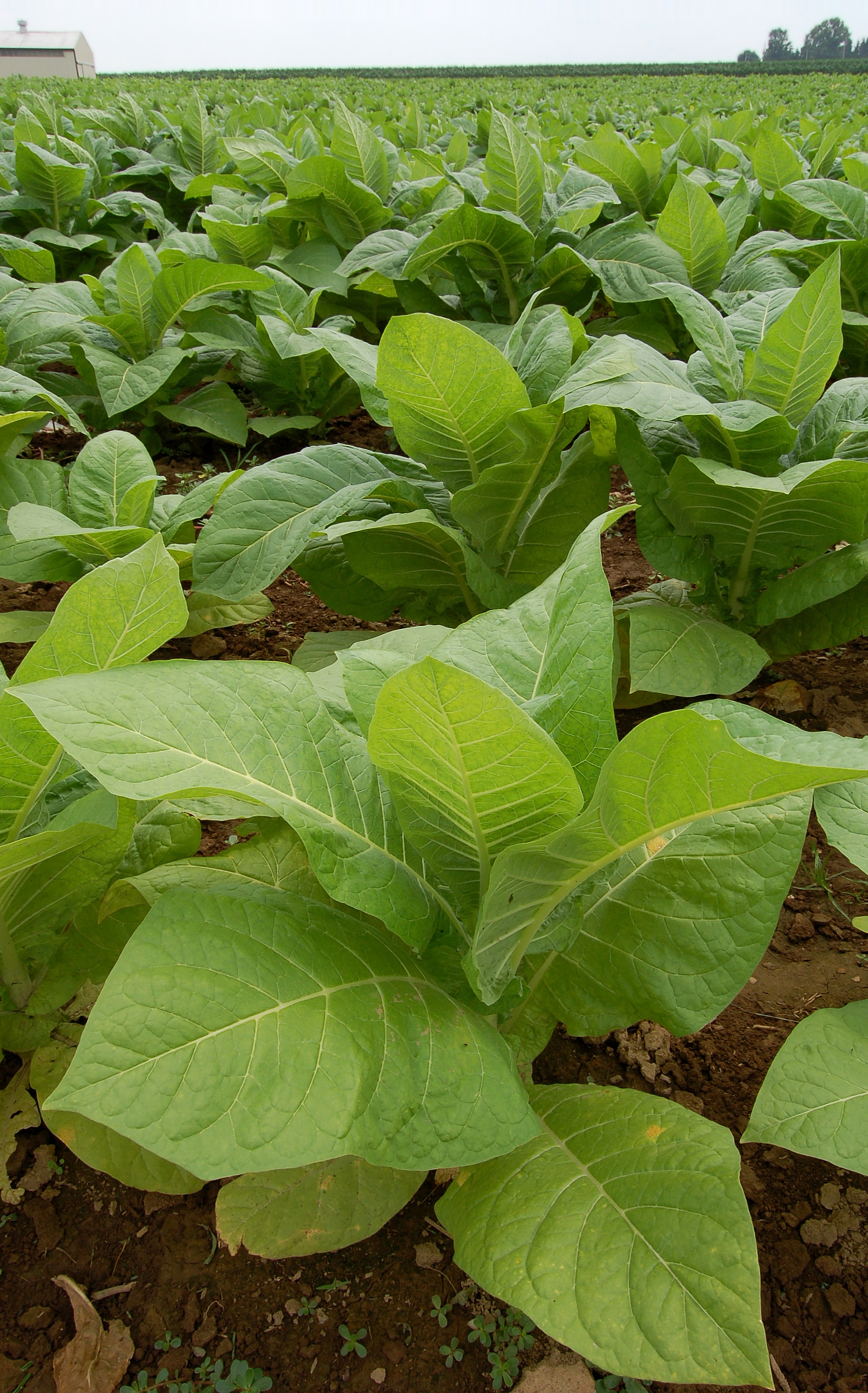
Nicotiana tobacco plant

Genetically modified plants must be safe for the environment and suitable for coexistence with conventional and organic crops. A major hurdle for traditional nuclear genetically modified crops is posed by the potential outcrossing of the transgene via pollen movement. Initially it was thought that, plastid transformation, which yields transplastomic plants in which the pollen does not contain the transgene, not only increases biosafety, but also facilitates the coexistence of genetically modified, conventional and organic agriculture. Therefore, developing such crops was a major goal of research projects such as Co-Extra and Transcontainer.

However, a study conducted on the tobacco plant in 2007 has disproved this theory. Led by Ralph Bock from the Max Planck Institute of Molecular Plant Physiology in Germany, researchers studied genetically modified tobacco in which the transgene was integrated in chloroplasts. A transplastomic tobacco plant generated through chloroplast mediated transformation was bred with plants that were male sterile with an untouched chloroplast. The transplastomic plants were engineered to have resistance to the antibiotic spectinomycin and engineered to produce a green fluorescent protein molecule (GFP). Therefore, it was hypothesized that any offspring produced from these two lines of tobacco plant should not be able to grow on spectinomycin or be fluorescent, as the genetic material in the chloroplast should not be able to transfer via pollen. However, it was found that some of the seeds were resistant to the antibiotic and could germinate on spectinomycin agar plates. Calculations showed that 1 out of every million pollen grains contained plastid genetic material, which would be significant in an agricultural farm setting. Because tobacco has a strong tendency towards self-fertilisation, the reliability of transplastomic plants is assumed to be even higher under field conditions. Therefore, the researchers believe that only one in 100,000,000 GM tobacco plants actually would transmit the transgene via pollen. Such values are more than satisfactory to ensure coexistence. However, for GM crops used in the production of pharmaceuticals, or in other cases in which absolutely no outcrossing is permitted, the researchers recommend the combination of chloroplast transformation with other biological containment methods, such as cytoplasmic male sterility or transgene mitigation strategies. This study showed that whilst transplastomic plants do not have absolute gene containment, the level of containment is extremely high and would allow for coexistence of conventional and genetically modified agricultural crops.

There are public concerns regarding a possible transmission of antibiotic resistant genes to unwanted targets including bacteria and weeds. As a result of this, technologies have been developed to remove the selectable antibiotic resistance gene marker. One such technology that has been implemented is the Cre/lox system, where the nuclear encoded Cre recombinase can be placed under control of an inducible promoter to remove the antibiotic resistant gene once homoplasmicity has been achieved from the transformation process.

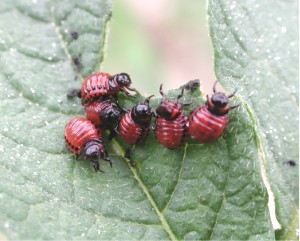
Potato beetle larvae

== Examples and the future ==
A recent example of transplastomics in agricultural applications was conferring potato plants protection against the Colorado potato beetle. This beetle is dubbed a "super-pest" internationally because it has gained resistance against many insecticides and are extremely voracious feeders. The beetle is estimated to cause up to US$1.4 million in crop damages annually in Michigan alone. A study conducted in 2015 by Zhang utilized transplastomics to introduce double stranded RNA producing transgenes into the plastid genome. The double stranded RNA confers protection to the transgenic potato plant via a RNA interference methodology, where consumption of the plant tissue by the potato beetle would result in silencing of key genes required by the beetle for survival. There was a high level of protection conferred, the leaves of the transplastomic potato plant were mostly unconsumed when exposed to the adult beetles and larvae. The investigation also revealed an 83% killing efficacy for larvae that consumed the leaves of the transplastomic plant. This study highlights that as pests gain resistance to traditional chemical insecticides, the use of transplastomics to deliver RNAI- mediated crop protection strategies could become increasingly viable in the future.

Another notable transplastomics based approach is the production of artemisinic acid through transplastomic tobacco plants which is the precursor molecule that can be used to produce artemisinin. Artemisinin- based combination therapy is the preferred and recommended treatment of choice by the WHO (World Health Organization) against malaria. Artemisinin is naturally derived from the plant Artemisia annua, however, only low concentrations of artemisinin in the plant can be harvested naturally and there is currently an insufficient supply for the global demand. A study conducted in 2016 led by Fuentes, managed to introduce the artemisininic acid production pathway into the chloroplast of N. tabacum through a biolistics approach before using their novel synthetic biology tool COSTREL (combinatorial supertransformation of transplastomic recipient lines) to generate a transplastomic N. tabacum plant that had a very high arteminisin acid yield. This study illustrates the potential benefits of transplastomics for bio-pharmaceutical applications in the future.

Although transplastomic transformation of non-green plastids is currently limited, research on the chloroplast genome has demonstrated applications in agriculture, biofuels, and biopharmaceuticals. These applications are facilitated by the ability to express multiple transgenes as operons and by the high copy number of chloroplast genomes. Research on transplastomics remains ongoing, with further development needed in areas including transformation of non-green plastids, transformation of cereal crops, and the limited glycosylation capability of chloroplasts.
