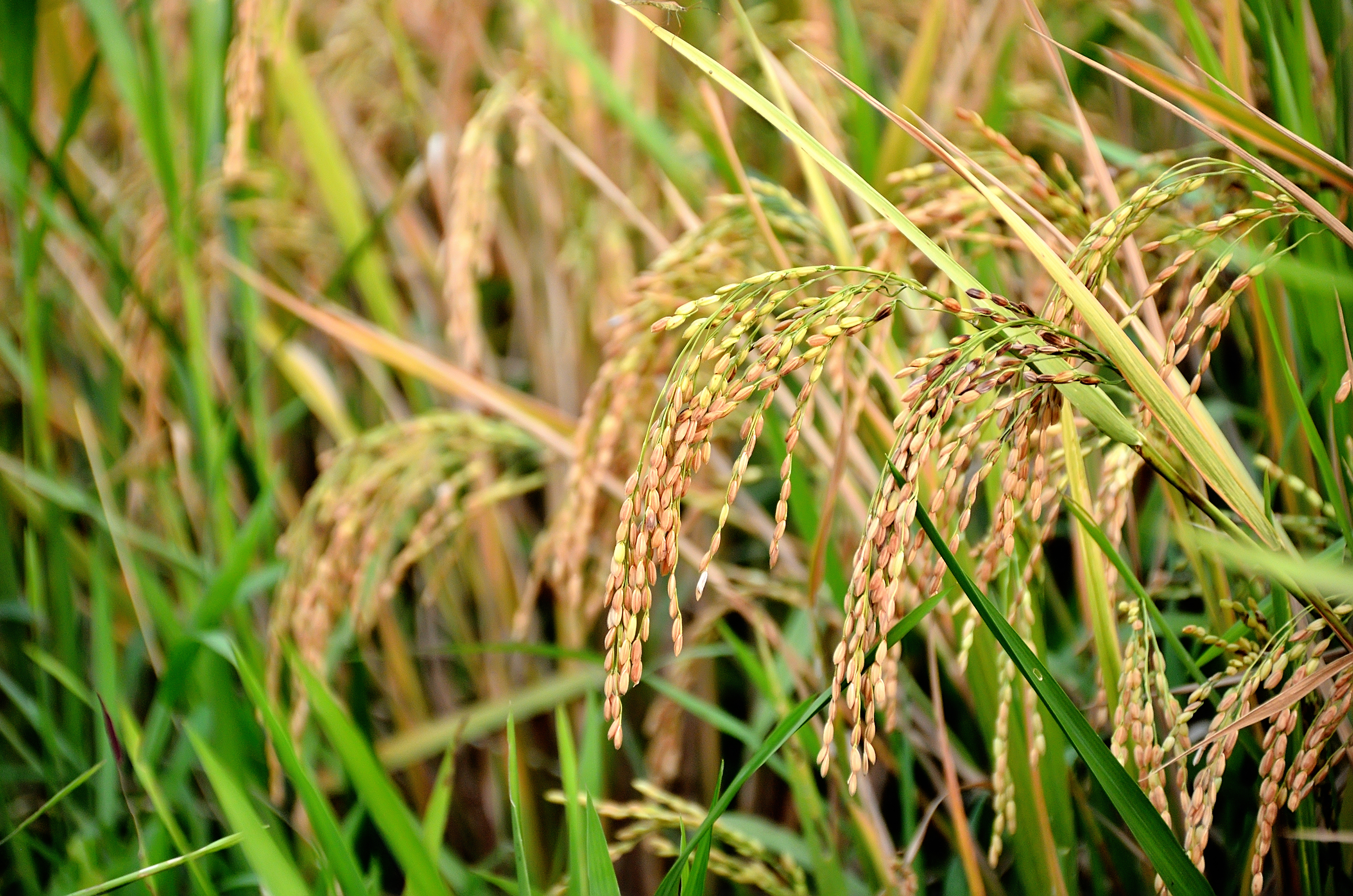
- Mature seed heads
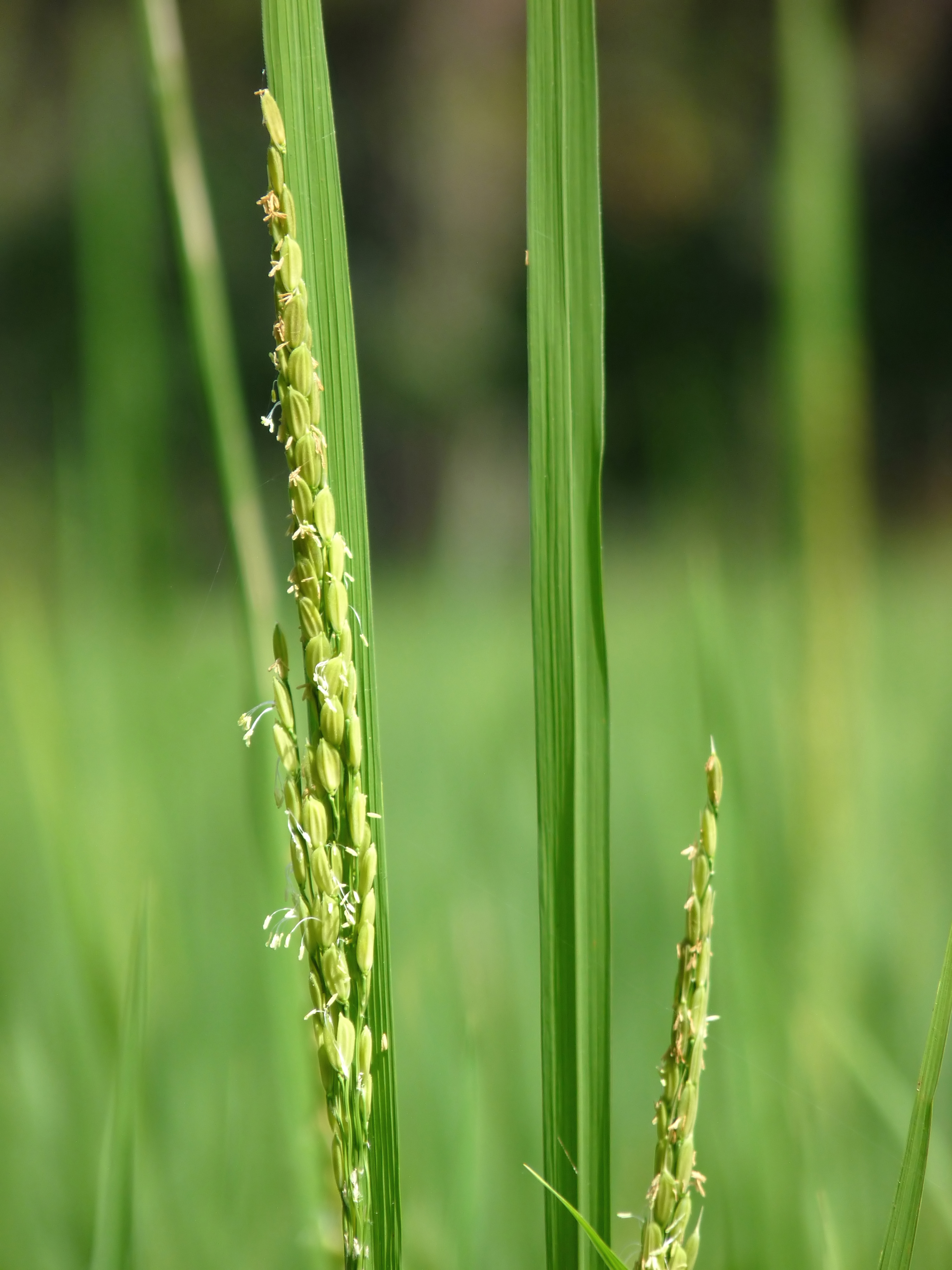
- Inflorescence

Scientific classification
- Kingdom: Plantae
- Clade: Tracheophytes
- Clade: Angiosperms
- Clade: Monocots
- Clade: Commelinids
- Order: Poales
- Family: Poaceae
- Genus: Oryza
- Species: O. sativa

Binomial name
- Oryza sativa L.

Synonyms
- List: Oryza aristata Blanco; Oryza communissima Lour.; Oryza denudata (Desv.) Steud.; Oryza elongata (Desv.) Steud.; Oryza formosana Masam. & Suzuki; Oryza glutinosa Lour.; Oryza marginata (Desv.) Steud.; Oryza montana Lour.; Oryza mutica Steud.; Oryza palustris Salisb.; Oryza parviflora P.Beauv.; Oryza perennis Moench; Oryza plena (Prain) N.P.Chowdhury; Oryza praecox Lour.; Oryza pubescens (Desv.) Steud.; Oryza pumila Steud.; Oryza repens Buch.-Ham. ex Steud.; Oryza rubribarbis (Desv.) Steud.; Oryza sativa subsp. indica Shig.Kato; Oryza sativa subsp. japonica Shig.Kato; Oryza segetalis Russell ex Steud.

= Oryza sativa =

Species of plant

Oryza sativa, having the common name Asian cultivated rice, is the much more common of the two rice species cultivated as a cereal, the other species being O. glaberrima, African rice. It was first domesticated in the Yangtze River basin in China 13,500 to 8,200 years ago.

Oryza sativa belongs to the genus Oryza and the BOP clade in the grass family Poaceae. With a genome consisting of 430 Mbp across 12 chromosomes, it is renowned for being easy to genetically modify and is a model organism for the study of the biology of cereals and monocots.

== Description ==
Oryza rufipogon is the scientific name for brownbeard rice. This wild rice was first domesticated into Oryza sativa, and its subsequent divergence into japonica and indica subspecies, occurred through a long process of domestication, artificial selection, and hybridization. Domestication led to artificial selection of rice with a mutation that made seeds non-shattering. This forced grains to stay attached and made harvesting easier. The plant was also bred for vertical architecture in its growth to maximize field density, and the awns were selectively bred away to reduce bulk density. Oryza sativa then led to the creation of two subspecies, japonica and indica. Oryza sativa subsp. japonica was primarily grown in temperate and subtropical regions, the plant was shorter than indica and had darker leaves. Japonica grains are short, round, and plump, and have lower amylose content than indica. Oryza sativa subsp. indica was primarily grown in tropical and humid regions. Indica has a taller growth and lighter leaf color. The grains are thinner, longer, and have higher amylose content. Diagram Legend 1.a - wild rice (Oryza rufipogon) 1.b - grains of wild rice (Oryza rufipogon) 2.a - Japanese rice (Oryza sativa subsp. japonica) 2.b - grains of Japanese rice (Oryza sativa subsp. japonica) 3.a - Indian rice (Oryza sativa subsp. indica) 3.b - grains of Indian rice (Oryza sativa subsp. indica)

O. sativa has an erect stalk stem that grows 80–120 cm (30–45 in) tall, with a smooth surface. The leaf is lanceolate, 15–30 cm (5 7/8–11 3/4 in) long, and grows from a ligule 10–20 mm (3/8–3/4 in) long.

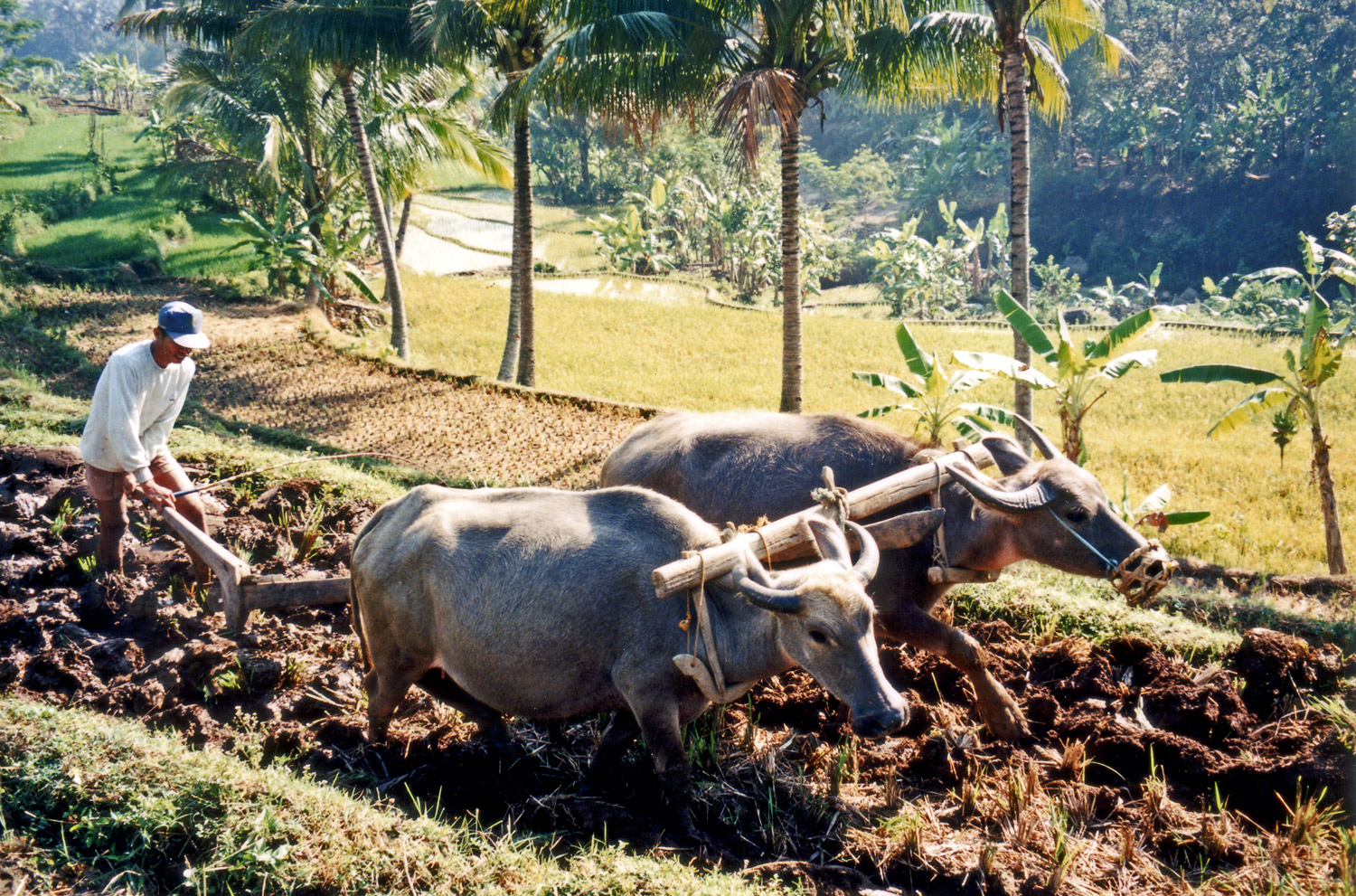
Water buffalo ploughing a rice paddyfield, Java

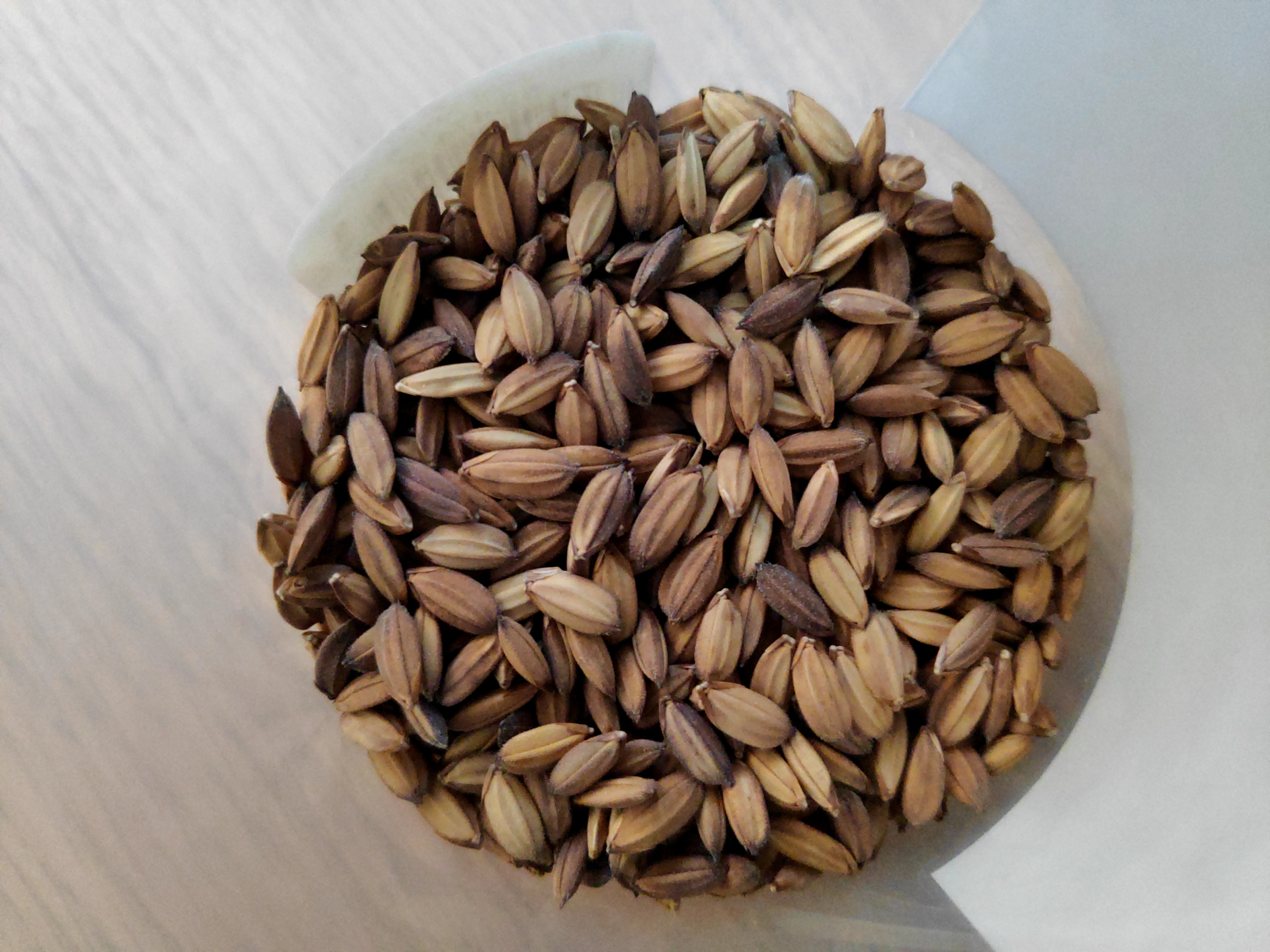
Jumli Marshi, brown rice from Nepal

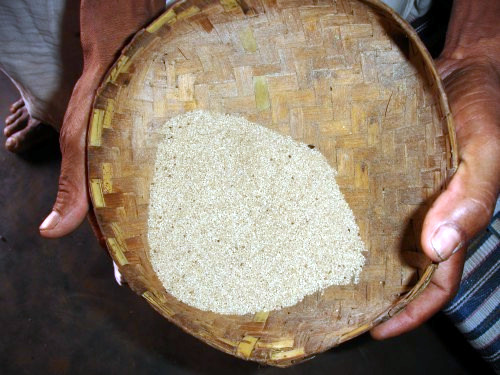
Traditional rice of Niyamgiri Hills, India

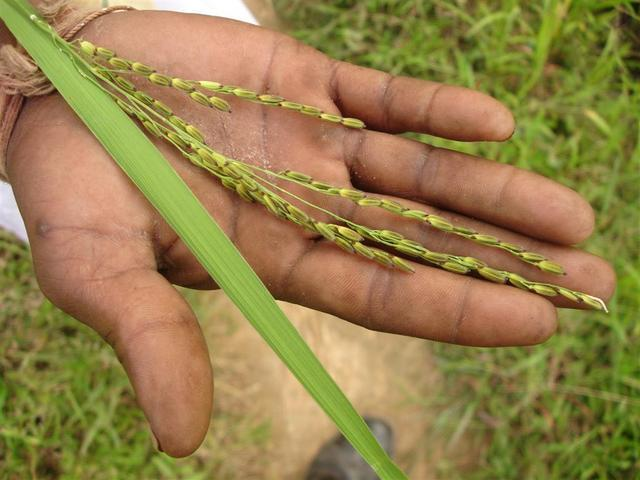
From Chhattisgarh

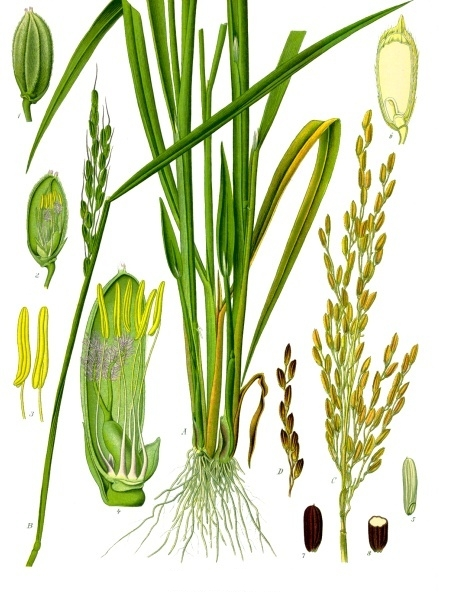

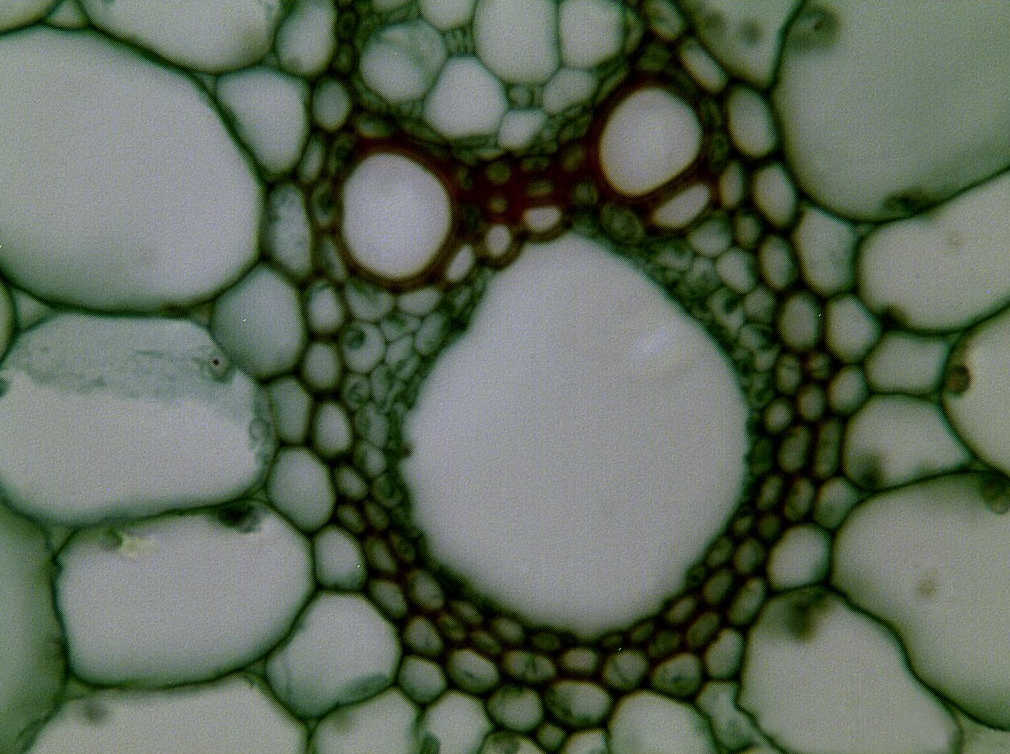
Stem cross section magnified 400 times

== Taxonomy ==
Oryza sativa contains two major subspecies: the sticky, short-grained japonica or sinica variety, and the nonsticky, long-grained indica rice variety. Japonica was domesticated in the Yangtze Valley 6,000–9,000 years ago, and its varieties can be cultivated in dry fields (it is cultivated mainly submerged in Japan), in temperate East Asia, upland areas of Southeast Asia, and high elevations in South Asia, while indica was domesticated around the Ganges 4,500–8,500 years ago, and its varieties are mainly lowland rices, grown mostly submerged, throughout tropical Asia. Rice grain occurs in a variety of colors, including white, brown, black (purple when cooked), and red.

A third subspecies, which is broad-grained and thrives under tropical conditions, was identified based on morphology and initially called javanica, but is now known as tropical japonica. Examples of this variety include the medium-grain 'Tinawon' and 'Unoy' cultivars, which are grown in the high-elevation rice terraces of the Central Cordillera Mountains of northern Luzon, Philippines.

Glaszmann (1987) used isozymes to sort O. sativa into six groups: japonica, aromatic, indica, aus, rayada, and ashina.

Garris et al. (2004) used simple sequence repeats to sort O. sativa into five groups: temperate japonica, tropical japonica and aromatic comprise the japonica varieties, while indica and aus comprise the indica varieties. The Garris scheme has held up against newer analyses as of 2019, though one 2014 article argues that rayada is distinct enough to be its own group under japonica.

=== Etymology ===
The generic name Oryza is derived from the Ancient Greek word for rice, while the specific epithet sativa means "cultivated".

== Genetics ==
=== Mapping and research tools ===
An accurate and usable simple sequence repeat marker set was developed and used to generate a high-density map.

A multiplex high-throughput marker assisted selection system has been developed but as with other crop HTMAS systems has proven difficult to customize, costly (both directly and for the equipment), and inflexible.

Other molecular breeding tools have produced rice blast resistant cultivars. DNA microarray has been used to advance understanding of hybrid vigor in rice, QTL sequencing has been used to elucidate seedling vigor, and genome wide association study (GWAS) by whole genome sequencing (WGS) has been used to investigate various agronomic traits.

In total, 641 copy number variations are known. Exome capture often reveals new single nucleotide polymorphisms in rice, due to its large genome and high degree of DNA repetition.

=== Specific genes ===
SPL14/LOC4345998 is a gene that regulates the overall architecture/growth habit of the plant. Some of its epialleles increase rice yield. \

Resistance to the rice blast fungus Magnaporthe grisea is provided by various resistance genes including Pi1, Pi54, and Pita. O. sativa uses the plant hormones abscisic acid and salicylic acid to regulate immune responses. Salicylic acid broadly stimulates, and abscisic acid suppresses, immunity to M. grisea; success depends on the balance between their levels.

O. sativa has a large number of insect resistance genes specifically for the brown planthopper. As of 2022, 15 R genes have been cloned and characterized.

Several O. sativa accessions also contain genetic adaptations to flooding. The Submergence 1 (Sub1) locus on chromosome 9 includes Sub1A, an ethylene-response-factor-like gene; the tolerance-specific Sub1A-1 allele is a major determinant of survival under complete submergence. In deepwater rice, the ethylene-response-factor genes SNORKEL1 and SNORKEL2 promote rapid internode elongation, allowing plants to adapt to rising floodwater.

== See also ==
- Domesticated plants and animals of Austronesia
- International Code of Nomenclature for Cultivated Plants
- Traceability of genetically modified organisms
