= Kondowole =

Malawian cassava dish

Kondowole is a staple of Malawian cuisine that is eaten predominantly in the northern region of Malawi. It is made from cassava flour and water. It is a very sticky meal and resembles that of the Malawian nsima, Tanzanian ugali, or English posho. It is mostly cooked on the floor because of its texture as it is normally tough to run a cooking stick through hence a lot of strength is needed.

Kondowole is normally eaten with fish; fish in Malawi ranges from "utaka" (pronounced "u-ta-ka") and "chambo" (a famous fish from Lake Malawi). Kondowole is not a meal that can be made in bulk because of its consistency and texture, therefore is not as frequently eaten as nsima.

== Preparation of Kondowole flour ==
To prepare Kondowole:

1. First peel the cassava and soak it for up to four days, depending upon the climate it is in, so that it ferments and becomes soft (it may take only two days if in very humid climates).
2. Remove from the water, remove the vascular bundle from the center, squeeze some of the excess water, and then pound with a mortar ("mtondo" in the local Malawian language chichewa) and pestle ("musi").
3. After pounding allow the cassava paste to dry in the sun. It is not meant to be placed in a heap but in small portions separated evenly.
4. When it is dry it should be put back in the mortar for grinding.
5. After grinding it should be sieved or taken to a maize mill.

== Cooking instructions ==
1. Place water in a small pot such that the water reaches the halfway mark then bring it to a boil.
2. Add four handfuls of the cassava flour into the water until it forms a sticky paste and stir for a minute whilst on heat.
3. Remove the pot from the heat and continue mixing the paste until all the flour disappears. (firm arms are needed for this step - in Malawi many people place the hot pot between their feet so that they may use both hands for mixing).
