= StarLink corn recall =

2000 recall of foods containing genetically modified corn

The StarLink corn recalls occurred in the autumn of 2000, when over 300 food products were found to contain a genetically modified corn that had not been approved for human consumption. It was the first-ever recall of a genetically modified food. The anti-GMO activist coalition Genetically Engineered Food Alert, which detected and first reported the contamination, was critical of the FDA for not doing its job. The recall of Taco Bell–branded taco shells, manufactured by Kraft Foods and sold in supermarkets, was the most publicized of the recalls. One settlement resulted in $60 million going to Taco Bell franchisees for lost sales due to the damage to the Taco Bell brand.

== StarLink corn ==
StarLink is a brand of transgenic maize containing two modifications: a gene for resistance to glufosinate, and a variant of the Bacillus thuringiensis (Bt) protein called Cry9C. Cry9C had not been used in a GM crop prior to StarLink, causing heightened regulatory scrutiny. StarLink's creator, Plant Genetic Systems, which became Aventis CropScience during the time of the incident, had applied to the United States Environmental Protection Agency (EPA) to market StarLink for use in both animal feed and human foods. The Garst Seed Company (part of the Advanta group) was licensed by Aventis to produce and sell StarLink seed in the US.

However, because the Cry9C protein lingers in animal digestive systems before breaking down, the EPA had concerns about its allergenicity, and PGS did not provide sufficient data to prove that Cry9C was not allergenic. As a result, PGS split its application into separate permits for use in foods intended for human consumption and for use in animal feed only. StarLink was approved by the EPA for use in animal feed in May 1998. Following the recalls, PGS at first tried to get the application for human consumption approved, and then withdrew the product entirely from the market.

== Product recalls ==
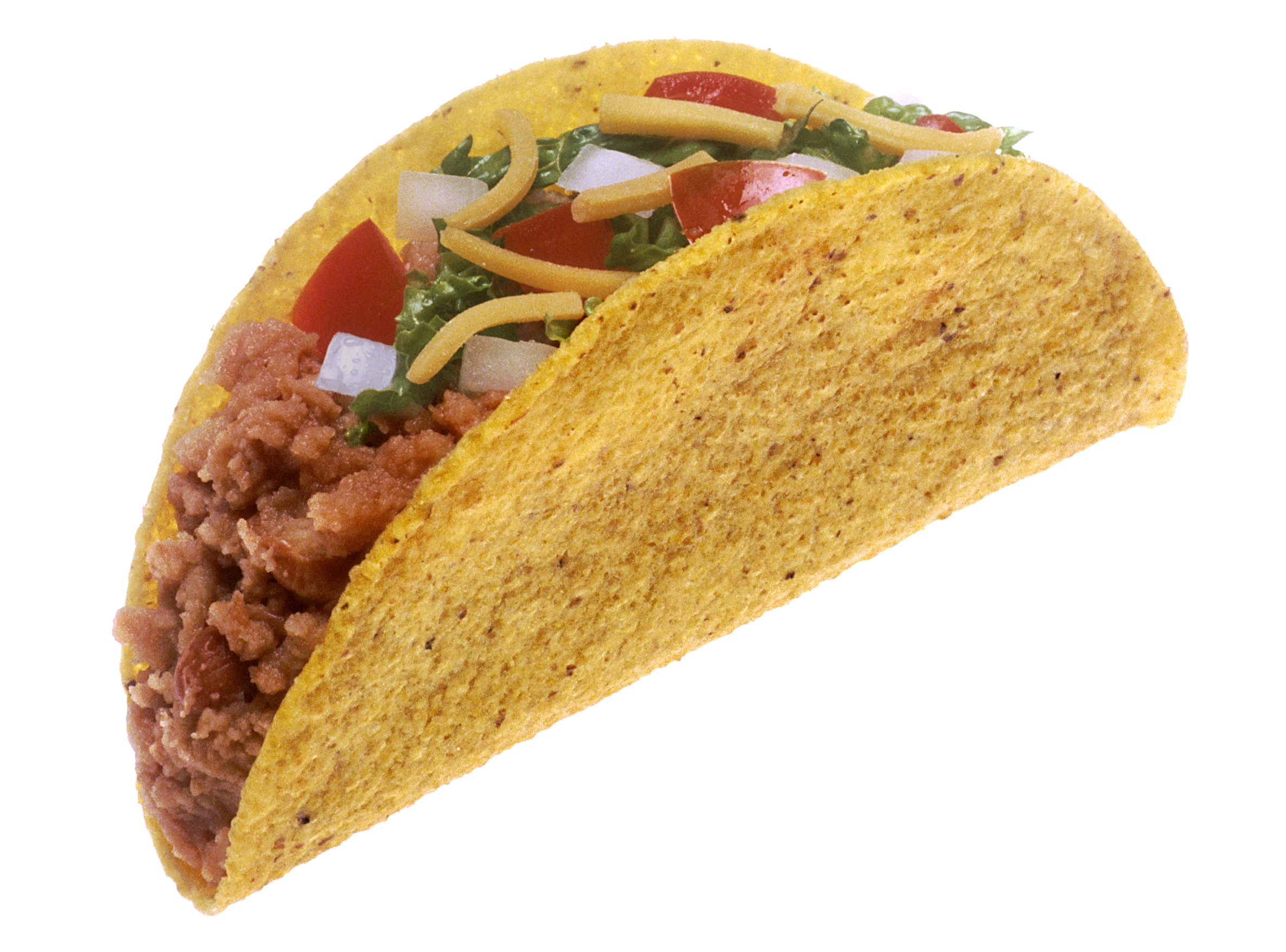
A taco with a hard taco shell

In 2000, Genetically Engineered Food Alert was launched by seven organizations (Center for Food Safety, Friends of the Earth, Institute for Agriculture and Trade Policy, National Environmental Trust, Organic Consumers Association, Pesticide Action Network North America, and The State PIRGs) to lobby the FDA, Congress and companies to ban or stop using GMOs. One of their activities was testing food for the presence of GMOs via a lab called Genetic ID, the vice president of which was Jeffrey M. Smith.

On September 18, 2000, Genetically Engineered Food Alert released a statement that Genetic ID had conducted tests on "Taco Bell Home Originals" brand taco shells, made by Kraft Foods that had been purchased in a grocery store near Washington, DC, and had detected StarLink; the story was reported on by The Washington Post. Kraft has distributed Taco Bell-branded meal kits, tortillas and taco shells since 1996 under a brand licensing agreement with Taco Bell's owner, currently Yum! Brands.

Kraft had bought the shells from a Sabritas plant in Mexicali which used flour supplied from an Azteca mill plant in Plainview, Texas. The Texas mill used flour from six states supplied by elevators that did not segregate their genetically modified and conventionally-grown corn at the time. Kraft also suspended production of the recalled products. "All of us—government, industry and the scientific community—need to work on ways to prevent this kind of situation from ever happening again," said Betsy Holden, Kraft's chief executive in September 2000. She also stated that food safety and legal compliance were Kraft's main priority.

Safeway later announced it would recall its store brand taco shells at the recommendation of a consumer group on October 12, 2000. This was done as a precaution, and no StarLink was confirmed to be found in any of the products On October 13 and 14, Mission Foods voluntary recalled about 300 products. On October 22, 2000, it was reported that Kellogg's had shut down a plant as a precaution because they couldn't guarantee that StarLink corn flour had not been supplied to the plant.

On October 26, 2000, StarLink corn was reported to be found in Japan and South Korea. The market and distribution network for corn in the US was thrown into disarray through 2001, as there were no existing means to segregate the grain; the disarray eventually eased due to Aventis' testing and buyback program.

== Aventis recall/buyback ==
In January 2001, under a written agreement with 17 US states, Aventis initiated a program called the StarLink Enhanced Stewardship (SES) program, under which StarLink corn, buffer corn, and any corn stored in grain elevators that had become mixed with StarLink, would be bought by Aventis and directed to animal feed and non-food industrial use (e.g. ethanol production); the program included free kits to test for StarLink, and covered costs of cleaning equipment, transport, and storage facilities, as well as increased transportation costs. Aventis estimated the cost would be between $100 million to $1 billion.

It was estimated that due to grain mixing StarLink corn could have existed in more than 50% of the US corn supply and that overall, the StarLink incident depressed the price of US corn about 7% for about a year.

== Aftermath ==
Following the recalls, 51 people reported adverse effects to the FDA; these reports were reviewed by the US Centers for Disease Control (CDC), which determined that 28 of them were possibly related to StarLink. The CDC studied the blood of these 28 individuals and concluded there was no evidence the reactions these people experienced were associated with hypersensitivity to the StarLink Bt protein.

The EPA was criticized by Joseph Mendelson III of the Center for Food Safety, who said, "Clearly they didn't do anything here until they became embarrassed." The EPA and Aventis were also criticized for statements at the time of the recall that indicated they had no idea such a thing would happen. "If there has been a violation of our licensing process, then we would have a very great concern," was attributed to Stephen Johnson of the EPA. Margaret Gadsby of Aventis was quoted with her earlier statement, "We have difficulty imagining how our corn could end up in the human food supply."

The registration for the StarLink varieties was voluntarily withdrawn by Aventis in October 2000. In February 2001, it was announced that the president, general counsel, and vice president of market development for Aventis CropScience (US), had been fired in response to the recall.

In June 2001, Tricon Global Restaurants, which owned 20% of Taco Bell at the time, announced a $60 million settlement with some of the suppliers of the supermarket taco shells; under the terms of the settlement they could not disclose the identity of suppliers. Tricon stated that the settlement would go to Taco Bell franchisees and Tricon would not receive any of it. Tricon also announced that it, along with the suppliers and franchisees, would initiate litigation against the parties responsible for StarLink entering the food chain.

In September 2001, a group of about 5,000 Taco Bell franchisees and a handful of taco shell suppliers brought a class-action lawsuit against Aventis, Garst Seed Co.; Gruma Corp. ("the largest producer and distributor of corn flour and tortillas in the United States); and Azteca Milling seeking damages. This suit was voluntarily dismissed in December 2001.

In 2002, Aventis, Garst, Kraft Foods, Azteca Foods, Azteca Milling, and Mission Foods settled a lawsuit brought by two people, and the grandmother of a third, who claimed to have had allergic reactions to StarLink, for $9 million.

In 2002, nongovernmental organizations claimed that aid sent by the UN and the US to Central American nations also contained some StarLink corn. The nations involved, Nicaragua, Honduras, El Salvador, and Guatemala, refused to accept the aid.

In 2003, farmers who did not plant StarLink who had suffered economic losses due to depressed corn prices following the StarLink recalls settled a class-action lawsuit against Aventis and Advanta for $100 million.

GeneWatch UK and Greenpeace International set up the GM Contamination Register in 2005 citing these recalls as one of the "highlights" of the register.

The US corn supply was monitored by the Federal Grain Inspection Service for the presence of the StarLink Bt proteins from 2001 until 2010.

== Later incidents ==
In August 2013, StarLink corn was reported to be found again contaminating some foods in Saudi Arabia.

== See also ==
- Genetically modified organism containment and escape
- Fair Packaging and Labeling Act (US)
- Genetically modified food controversies
- Regulation of the release of genetically modified organisms
