= HB4 wheat =

Type of wheat

HB4 wheat is a type of wheat that has been genetically modified by introducing a sunflower gene to confer drought tolerance and a gene from the bacteria Streptomyces hygroscopicus to make it tolerant to the herbicide glufosinate.

== History ==
In 2004 a team led by Dr. Raquel Chan, Director of Instituto de Agrobiotecnología del Litoral de la Universidad Nacional del Litoral, and members of CONICET jointly patented with the Bioceres agrotechnological group, a genetic construct that years later would give rise to IND-ØØ412-7 wheat (known as HB4 wheat or as "genetically modified wheat"). This variety of wheat is produced through genetic engineering (also called transgenic) and is characterized by its response to drought conditions. The seed was designed with the intention of withstanding longer periods of stress without stopping the accumulation of biomass, improving crop stability and increasing yield.

== Characteristics ==
The HB4 gene introduced into wheat comes from the sunflower and encodes the protein HAHB4 (Helianthus Annuus Homeobox-4) which, being a transcription factor (TF), binds to specific sequences of wheat DNA and regulates the expression of certain genes. The HAHB4 protein belongs to a family of transcription factors whose levels are naturally increased by various types of environmental stress, particularly drought stress.

In event IND-ØØ412-7, this regulation causes a delay in the entry of the plant to the deterioration process known as senescence, giving it some time to wait for the return of normal water availability. This means that it regulates the sensitivity of the protection mechanisms that are triggered in the absence of this essential resource for the plant.

== HB4 around the world ==
HB4 wheat was created to tolerate droughts. These characteristics result in increased yield compared to unmodified varieties. This technology has been approved in the following countries:

- Argentina in 2020
- Brazil 2021
- United States in 2022
- Australia and New Zealand in 2022
- Nigeria in 2022
- Colombia in 2022
