= Malawian cuisine =

Culinary traditions of Malawi

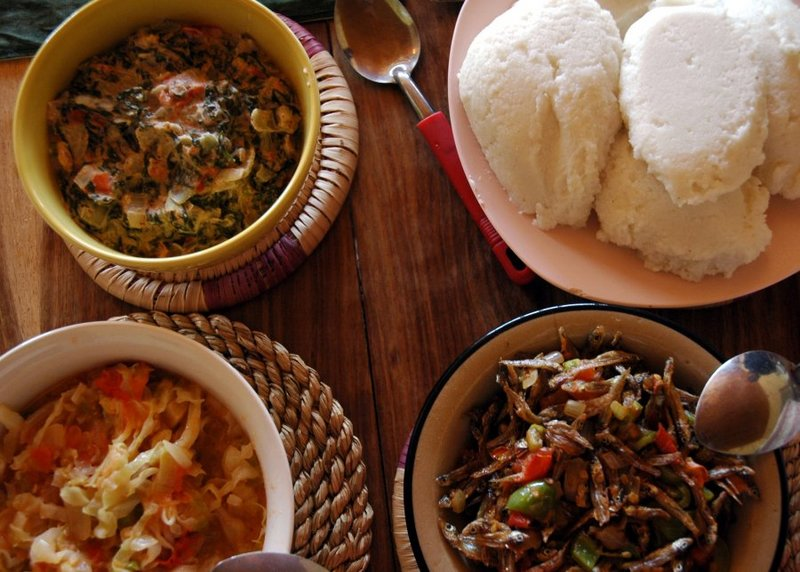
Nsima (top right corner) with three relishes

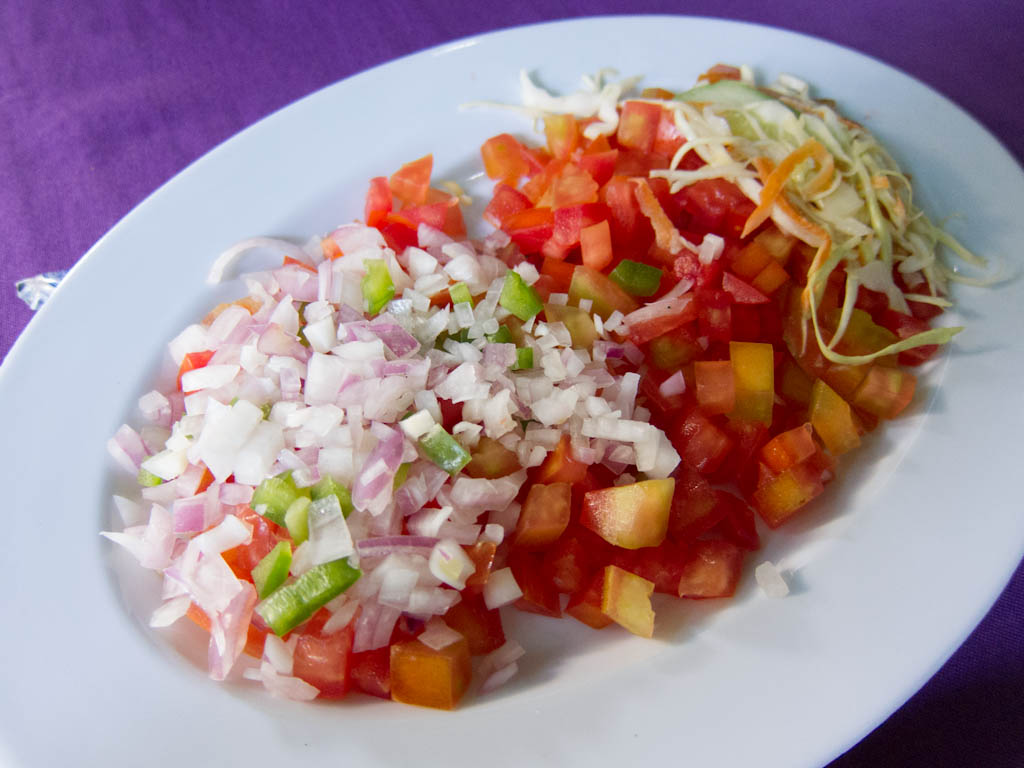
Kachumbari

Tea and fish are popular features of Malawian cuisine. Sugar, coffee, corn, potatoes, sorghum, cattle and goats are also important components of the cuisine and economy.

Lake Malawi is a source of fish including chambo (similar to bream), usipa (similar to sardine), mpasa (similar to salmon), and kampango.

Nsima is a staple food made from ground corn and served with side dishes of meat, beans and vegetables. It can be eaten for lunch and dinner.

Additional Malawi cuisine includes:

- Kachumbari, a type of tomato and onion salad, known locally in Malawi as a sumu or shum or simply 'tomato and onion salad'.
- Thobwa, a fermented drink made from white maize and millet or sorghum.
- Kondowole, made from cassava flour and water. It is primarily from northern Malawi and is a very sticky meal resembling Malawian nsima, Tanzanian ugali, or Ugandan posho. It is mostly cooked on the floor because of its texture as it is normally tough to run a cooking stick through hence much strength is needed. Kondowole is normally eaten with fish.
- Futali
- Nthochi, banana bread
Location of Malawi

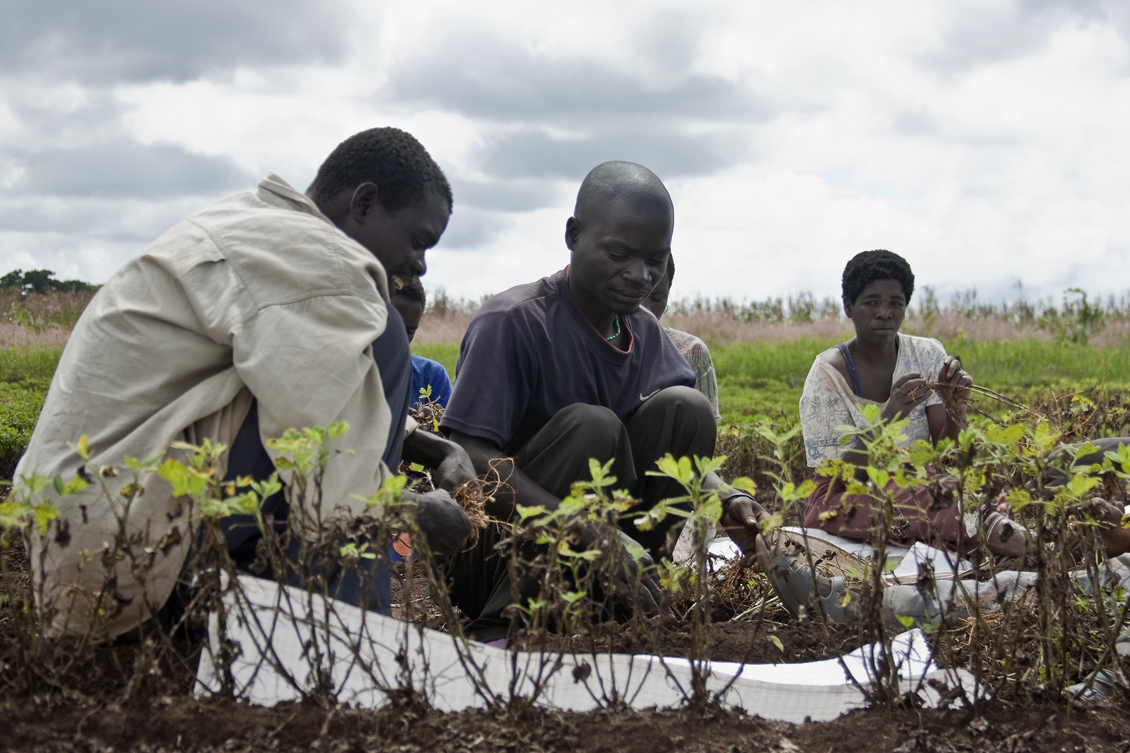
Harvesting groundnuts at an agricultural research station in Malawi

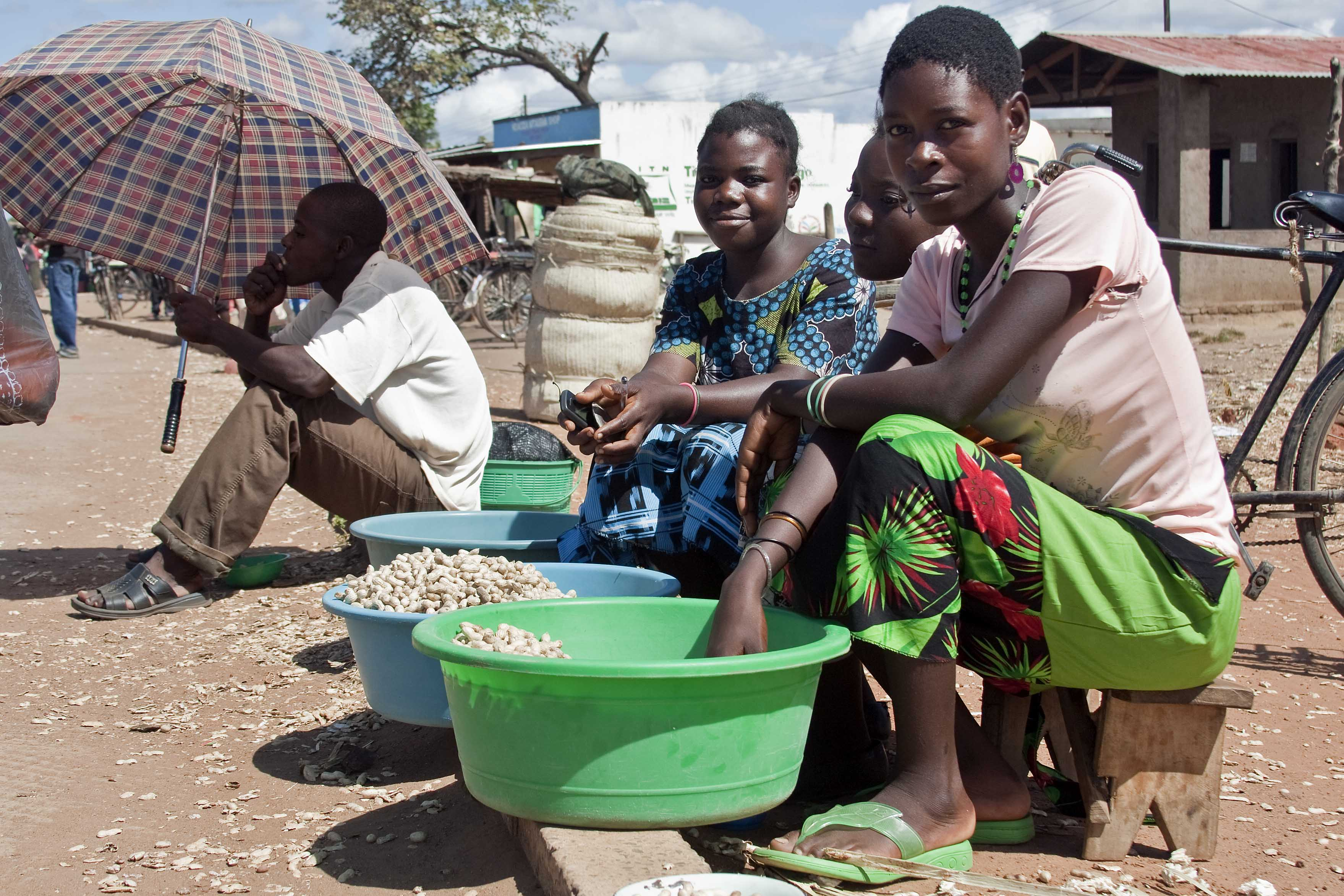
Women in Salima District, Malawi, selling groundnuts

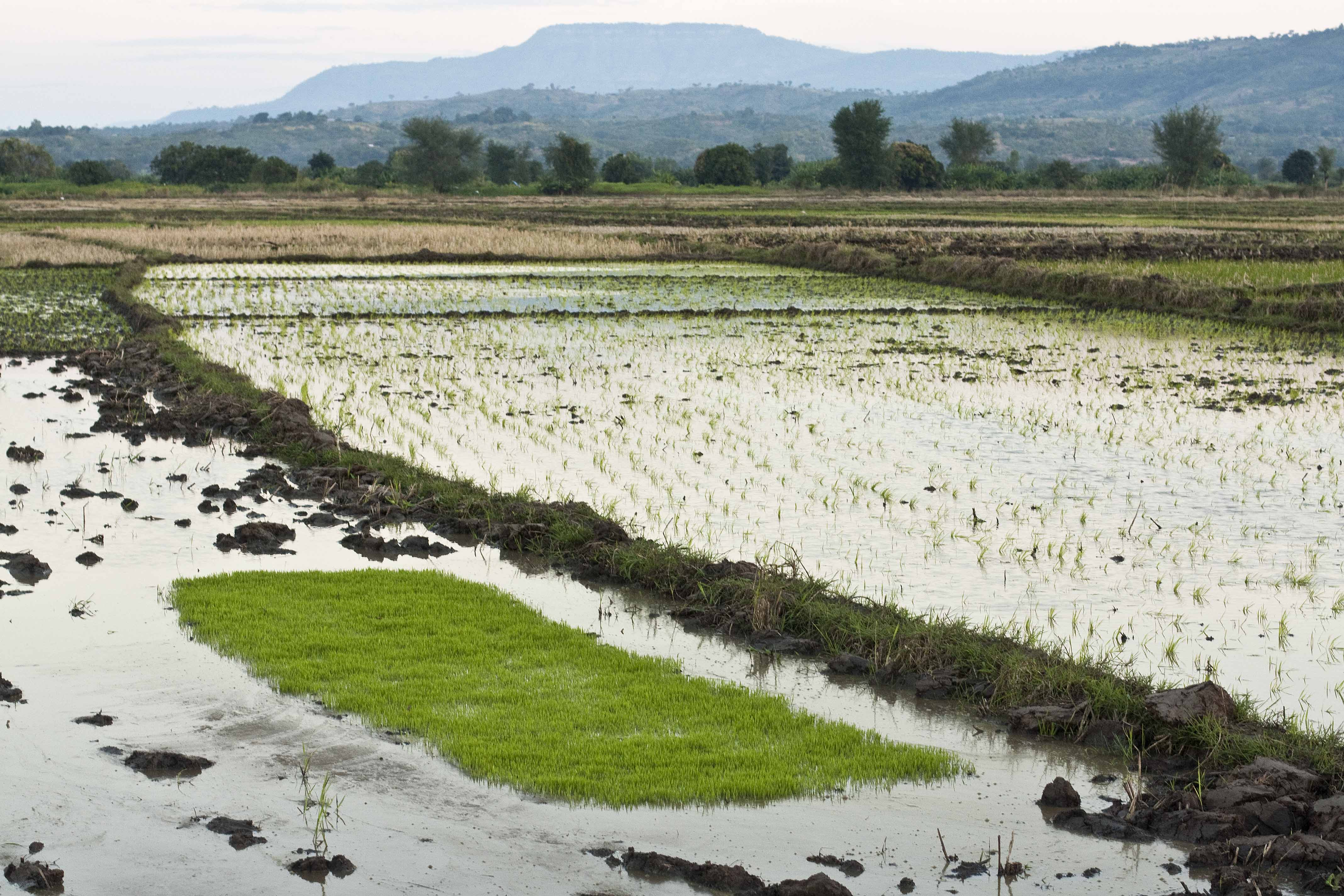
Rice fields in Karonga

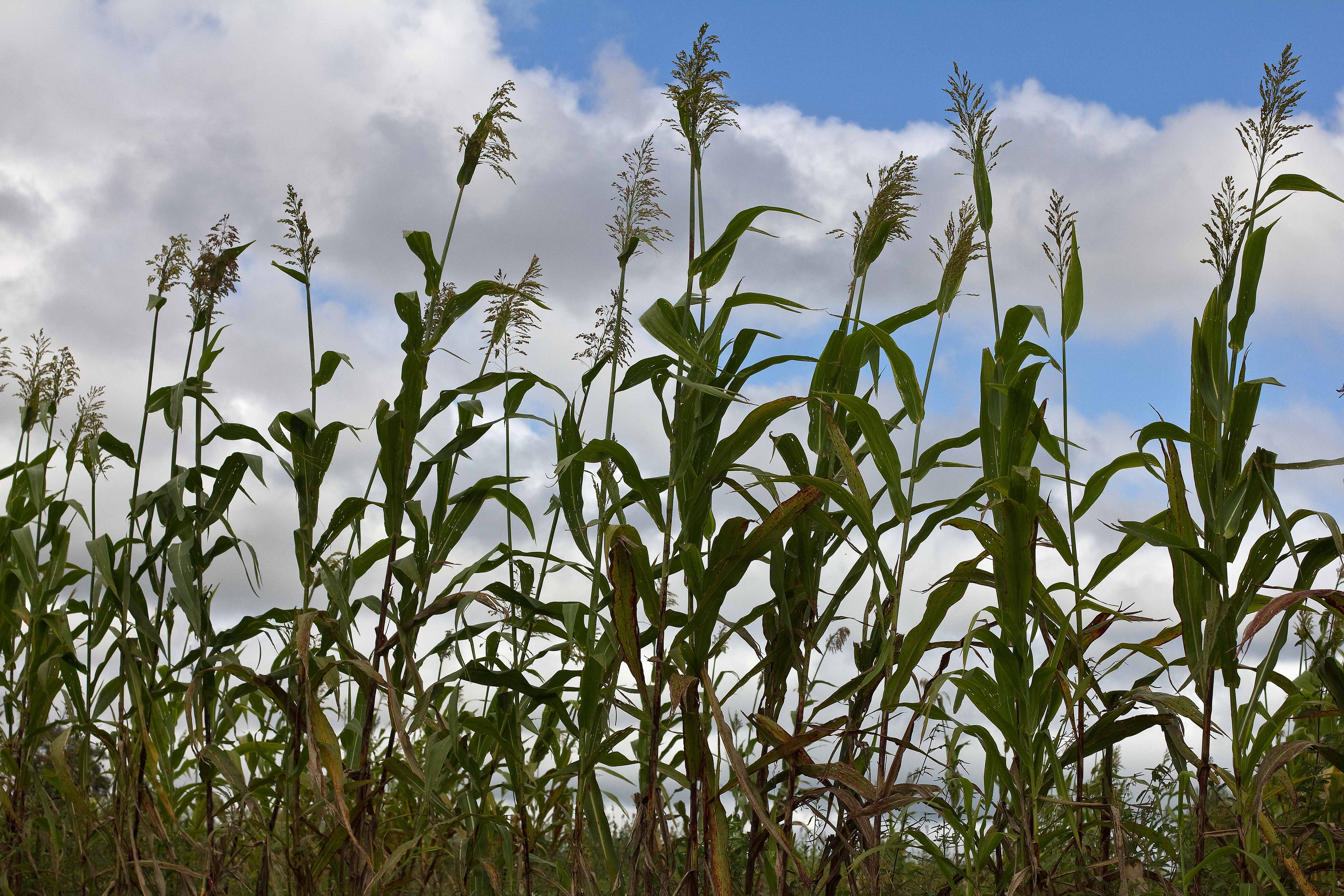
A local Malawian variety of sorghum

== Fish ==
Fish eaten in Malawi include utaka, kapenta, kampango, bombe, mlamba, micheni, butter fish (known as batala) and chambo (a widely known fish from Lake Malawi), among others.

Kondowole is not a meal that can be made in bulk because of its consistency and texture, and it is therefore not as frequently eaten as nsima.

== See also ==
- Agriculture in Malawi
- Malawian food crisis
