= Homoplasmy =

Identity of organellar DNA sequences in a cell

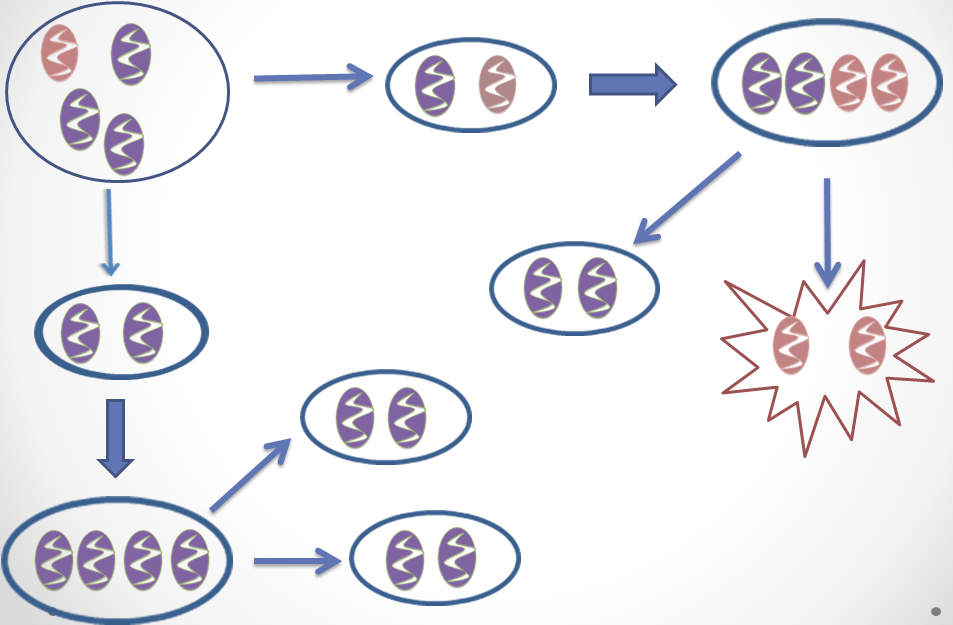
The cell in the top left is heteroplasmic as shown by the normal mitochondria in purple and the mitochondria with a mtDNA mutation in red. As this cell divides, the mitochondria replicate and independently assort into the daughter cells. This leads to both positive and negative (cell shown in red) homoplasmy.

Homoplasmy is a term used in genetics to describe a eukaryotic cell whose copies of mitochondrial DNA are all identical. In normal and healthy tissues, all cells are homoplasmic. Homoplasmic mitochondrial DNA copies may be normal or mutated; however, most mutations are heteroplasmic (only occurring in some copies of mitochondrial DNA). It has been discovered, though, that homoplasmic mitochondrial DNA mutations may be found in human tumors.

The term may also refer to uniformity of plant plastid DNA, whether occurring naturally or otherwise.

== Inheritance ==
In almost every species, mitochondrial DNA is maternally inherited. This means that all of the offspring of a female will have identical and homoplasmic mitochondrial DNA. It is very rare for females to pass on heteroplasmic or homoplasmic mutations because of the genetic bottleneck, where only a few out of many mitochondria actually are passed on to offspring.

The mussel Mytilus edulis is an anomaly in terms of mitochondrial DNA inheritance. Unlike almost all animals, this species has biparental inheritance for mitochondrial DNA, meaning that both the male and the female contribute mitochondria to the offspring. This was discovered when researchers realized that most individuals of a Mytilus edulis population were heteroplasmic. Researchers also believe that this could be a by-product of species hybridization.

== Mutations ==
There is evidence of both homoplasmic and heteroplasmic inherited mutations that lead to disease, though heteroplasmic mutations typically are a precursor to homoplasmic disease. Many diseases resulting from mutations in mitochondrial DNA are not inherited but developed as the untranslated region of mitochondrial DNA (mtDNA) is thought to be particularly susceptible to mutation. Many cancer types are the result of mutations in the mtDNA. For example, a specific type of mutation in one specific area of mtDNA was found to be in several different tumor types.

Mitochondria often undergo fission and fusion, which means that different organelles in the same cell can fuse together to become one mitochondria, or can break apart and become two. This process can be used to mitigate the effects of heteroplasmic mutations. Each mitochondria has multiple nucleoids, which consist of several copies of mtDNA, and when mitochondria fuse together, these nucleoids do not exchange DNA; therefore, if two mitochondria that have different DNA fuse together, they will have only two types of nucleoids. This means that fusion can be used to generate complementary nucleoids if a mutation causes one mitochondria to no longer be functional. Additionally, fission can cause one mitochondria with two different nucleoids to become two mitochondria each with only one type of nucleoid. Some researchers believe that this could be a useful tool to treat diseases caused by mutations in mtDNA.

== Inherited homoplasmic diseases ==
=== Leber's hereditary optic neuropathy ===
Leber's hereditary optic neuropathy (LHON) is the disease in humans that is most frequently associated with homoplasmy. This condition is characterized by the atrophy of retinal ganglion cells, which leads to central blindness and eventually total blindness. Although it is passed down maternally, it is seen more often in young men than in other ages or sexes, which leads researchers to believe that there are many other genetic or environmental factors that contribute to developing the disease. Specifically, researchers have thought that the genetic component outside of the mitochondria would be on the X chromosome; however, in multiple studies, there have been no findings that suggest this. Environmental factors, cigarette smoke in particular, have been shown to affect LHON's penetrance. In one study, cigarette smoke condensate was used to demonstrate the effects of smoking on cells with the LHON mutation. All cells were homoplasmic, but some were from individuals who were afflicted with LHON and some were from individuals who were just carriers. The researchers found that cigarette smoke condensate lowered the amount of mitochondria in the cells, but that carrier individuals were better able to compensate than those from individuals with LHON. Though there is an additive environmental effect, there is more to learn about why certain homoplasmic individuals have the disease and others do not.

=== Cancer ===
Some research has shown that an inherited heteroplasmic mutation can cause cancer in older age as cells become homoplasmic. In one study, doctors found that a cancer patient's tumor consisted of only homoplasmic cells with mutant mtDNA and that healthy cells in his body were heteroplasmic for mutant mtDNA. Additionally, researchers found that the patient's siblings had the same heteroplasmic mutation. This indicates that the heteroplasmic mutation was inherited, and over time led to homoplasmic cells that caused cancer.

== See also ==
- Heteroplasmy
- Microheteroplasmy
