= Gene stacked event =

A genetically modified organism (GMO) and all subsequent identical clones resulting from a transformation process are called collectively a transformation event. If more than one gene from another organism has been transferred, the created GMO has stacked genes (or stacked traits), and is called a gene stacked event.

Gene stacked events have become an important topic in plant breeding. Occasionally, researchers wish to transfer more than one trait (e.g. an insect resistance and a herbicide resistance) to a crop. Consequently, they need to transfer more than one gene, and do so either in one or in subsequent steps. This can be achieved either by genetic engineering or by conventional cross-breeding of GM plants with two different modifications.
