= Traceability of genetically modified organisms =

The traceability of genetically modified organisms (GMOs) describes a system that ensures the forwarding of the identity of a GMO from its production to its final buyer. Traceability is an essential prerequisite for the co-existence of GM and non-GM foods, and for the freedom of choice for consumers.

== See also ==
- Detection of genetically modified organisms
