= Genetically modified wheat =

Wheat which is genetically engineered

Genetically modified wheat is wheat that has been genetically engineered by the direct manipulation of its genome using biotechnology. As of 2020, no genetically modified wheat is grown commercially, although many field tests have been conducted. One wheat variety, Bioceres HB4 Wheat, is obtaining regulatory approval from the government of Argentina.

== Background ==
Wheat is a natural hybrid derived from interspecies breeding. It is theorized that wheat's ancestors (Triticum monococcum, Aegilops speltoides, and Aegilops tauschii, all diploid grasses) hybridized naturally over millennia somewhere in West Asia, to create natural polyploid hybrids, the best known of which are common wheat and durum wheat.

Wheat (Triticum spp.) is an important domesticated grass used worldwide for food. Its evolution has been influenced by human intervention since the dawn of agriculture.

Interspecies transfer of genes continued to occur in farmers' fields during the shift from the Paleolithic diet to the diet adopted by humans following the Neolithic Revolution, or first green revolution. During the transition from a hunter-gatherer social structure to more agrarian societies, humans began to cultivate wheat and further transform it for their needs. Thus, the social and cultural roots of humans and the development of wheat have intertwined since before recorded history.

This process resulted in various wheat species that are grown for specific purposes and climates. In 1873, Wilson cross-pollinated rye and wheat to create triticale. Further transformations using cytogenic hybridization techniques enabled Norman Borlaug, father of the second Green Revolution, to develop wheat species (the semidwarf varieties) that would grow in harsh environments.

Recombinant DNA techniques were developed in the 1980s, work began on creating the first transgenic wheat, coincident with the third Green Revolution. Of the three most important cereals in the world (corn, rice, and wheat), wheat was the last to be transformed by transgenic, biolistic methods in 1992, and by Agrobacterium methods in 1997. Unlike corn and rice, its widespread use in the human diet has faced cultural resistance.

== Field trials and approvals ==
As of 2013, 34 field trials of GM wheat have taken place in Europe and 419 have taken place in the US. Modifications tested include those to create resistance to herbicides, create resistance to insects and to fungal pathogens (especially fusarium) and viruses, tolerance to drought and resistance to salinity and heat, increased and decreased content of glutenin, improved nutrition (higher protein content, increased heat stability of the enzyme phytase, increased content of water-soluble dietary fiber, increased lysine content), improved qualities for use as biofuel feedstock, production of drugs via pharming, and yield increases.

The Argentinian company Bioceres developed a plant with the HaHB4 gene and it was grown under a wide range of growing conditions that showed better adaptation to drought-prone environments, the most important constraint affecting crop yields worldwide.

== Bioceres's HB4 ==
The Argentina-based company Bioceres developed a genetically modified wheat variety with higher yield under drought stress. The variety is named for its expression of a transcription factor, HaHB4, from sunflowers and also known as line IND-00412-7. It was approved by the Argentine government in October 2020, with commercial introduction pending approval of the crop for import by Brazil, Argentina's major wheat export partner.

On 6 May 2022, HB4 was approved by Food Standards Australia New Zealand.

== Monsanto's MON 71800 ==
The transgenic wheat that was furthest developed was Monsanto's MON 71800,r which is glyphosate-resistant via a CP4/maize EPSPS gene. Monsanto received approval from the FDA for its use in food, but withdrew its EPA application in 2004, so the product was never marketed. It also received approval for use as food in Colombia.

Studies conducted by Monsanto showed that its nutritional components are equivalent to nontransgenic, commercially available wheat, and animal studies that have used MON 71800 for feed have confirmed this. Environmental Risk assessments have been conducted by Monsanto, and government regulatory agencies have approved its use in food;

However, farmers were worried about the potential loss of markets in Europe and Asia due to public refusal of the end product, so Monsanto withdrew its EPA application for Roundup-Ready Wheat.

In 2010, Monsanto's partner in India, Mahyco, announced that it planned to seek approval to market GM wheat in India in the next three to five years.

== Escape of GM wheat seed ==
In 1999, scientists in Thailand claimed they discovered glyphosate-resistant wheat in a grain shipment from the Pacific Northwest of the United States, though transgenic wheat had never been approved for sale and was only ever grown in test plots. No one could explain how the transgenic wheat got into the food supply.

In May 2013, a strain of genetically engineered, glyphosate-resistant wheat was found on a farm in Oregon. Extensive testing confirmed the wheat as a variety – MON71800. The wheat had been developed by Monsanto, but never been approved or marketed after the company had tested it between 1998 and 2005. The unexplained presence of this type of wheat presents a problem to wheat growers when buyers demand GMO-free wheat. Japan subsequently suspended import of soft white wheat from the United States. A Kansas farmer sued Monsanto over the release, saying it had caused the price of wheat grown in the US to fall. Monsanto suggested that the presence of this wheat was likely an act of sabotage. On Jun 14, 2013, the USDA announced: "As of today, USDA has neither found nor been informed of anything that would indicate that this incident amounts to more than a single isolated incident in a single field on a single farm. All information collected so far shows no indication of the presence of GE wheat in commerce." As of August 30, 2013, while the source of the GM wheat remained unknown, Japan, South Korea, and Taiwan had all resumed placing orders, and the disruption of the export market was minimal.

The investigation was closed in 2014 after the USDA Animal and Plant Health Inspection Service had exhausted all leads, but had not found any evidence that the wheat had entered commercial supply.

In 2019, the USDA announced that genetically modified wheat plants engineered to resist Roundup were detected in an unplanted field in Washington state.

== Regulation ==
The regulation of genetic engineering concerns the approaches taken by governments to assess and manage the risks associated with the development and release of genetically modified crops. Differences in the regulation of GM crops exist between countries, with some of the most marked differences occurring between the US and Europe. Regulation varies in a given country depending on the intended use of the products of the genetic engineering. For example, a crop not intended for food use is generally not reviewed by authorities responsible for food safety.

== Bibliography ==
- Nelson, Gerald C, ed. (2001). Genetically Modified Organisms in Agriculture: economics and politics. Academic Press. ISBN 9780080488868.
- Jones, Huw D; Shewry, Peter R, eds. (2009). Transgenic Wheat, Barley and Oats: Production and Characterization Protocols. Humana Press. ISBN 9781588299611.
- Lal, Rattan; Hobbs, Peter R; Uphoff, Norman; et al., eds. (2004). Sustainable Agriculture and the International Rice-Wheat System. CRC Press. ISBN 9780824754914.
- Hamaker, Bruce R, ed. (2008). The Technology of Functional Cereal Products. CRC Press. ISBN 9781420066739.
- Heller, Knut J, ed. (2003). Genetically Engineered Food: Methods and Detection. John Wiley & Sons. ISBN 9783527606450.
- Heller, Knut J, ed. (2006). Genetically Engineered Food: Methods and Detection (2nd ed.). John Wiley & Sons. ISBN 9783527609390.
- Avise, John C (2004). The Hope, Hype and Reality of Genetic Engineering: Remarkable Stories from Agriculture, Industry, Medicine and the Environment (2nd ed.). Oxford University Press. ISBN 9780198037903.
- Brunk, Conrad Grebel; Coward, Harold G., eds. (2009). Acceptable Genes?: Religious Traditions and Genetically Modified Foods. SUNY Press. ISBN 9781438428963.
- Wilson, A Stephen (1876). "Wheat and Rye Hybrids". Transactions and Proceedings of the Botanical Society of Edinburgh. 12.
- Wrigley, Colin W; Corke, Harold; Walker, Charles, eds. (2004). Encyclopedia of Grain Science. Vol. 3. Elsevier Academic Press. ISBN 9780127654904.
