= Biparental inheritance =

Biparental inheritance is a type of biological inheritance where the progeny inherits a maternal and a paternal allele for one gene. It is one of the criteria for Mendelian inheritance. Sexual reproduction, where offspring result from the fusion of gametes from two parents, is the most common form of biparental inheritance. While less common, cases of biparental inheritance in extranuclear genes have been documented, such as biparental inheritance of mitochondrial DNA, or chloroplast DNA in plants. Biparental inheritance of nuclear DNA by way of sexual reproduction can allow for new combinations of alleles from each contributing parent. The production of gametes through meiosis can sometimes include recombination, or crossing-over, which is a possibility for novel combinations of alleles.

== Mendelian inheritance ==
Biparental inheritance is a requirement for a trait to be characterized as Mendelian. If the gene does not have alternate forms, described as alleles, which can differ in each parent and then come together in the resulting offspring, then this trait is non-Mendelian. Part of the reason biparental inheritance is obligatory in Mendelian inheritance is because another requisite is the fertilization of gametes which have been produced by random segregation. Without gametes created by random segregation, fertilization (which leads to biparental inheritance through these gametes) could not result in Mendelian inheritance.

== Mitochondrial biparental inheritance ==
Biparental extranuclear inheritance occurs in the yeast Saccharomyces cerevisiae, for example. Two haploid cells of opposite mating types fuse together, both of which contribute mitochondria to the diploid offspring. This is contrary to the majority of eukaryotic mitochondrial inheritance, which is largely inherited maternally. Within mitochondrial genomes, biparental inheritance and recombination have been documented in plants, animals and fungi by Barr et al. in 2005, but the extent of these phenomena are thought to vary substantially across taxa. Occasional biparental mitochondrial transmission may benefit offspring by facilitating the removal of disadvantageous mutations from a population, while at the same time, continuing to restrict the spread of selfish genetic elements, such as genes that have a replication and transmission advantage at the expense of other genes

While uncommon among most eukaryotes, biparental inheritance of mtDNA occurs regularly in bivalves. Paternal mtDNA leakage has been documented in sheep, mice, and Drosophila. In 2018, Luo et al. documented evidence of biparental inheritance of mitochondrial DNA in humans, which was thought to be only transmitted maternally. Although paternal mitochondrial DNA, in addition to the typically inherited maternal mtDNA, was proven to have been inherited by 17 members in three unrelated multigenerational families, researchers are not yet sure of the mechanisms through which this occurs. Luo et al. explain that maternal transmission of mtDNA results from the active elimination of paternal mitochondria, and that the genes underlying this elimination process may have undergone certain mutations to allow mtDNA to continue through embryonic development. Mitochondrial endonuclease G relocates from the intermembrane space of paternal mitochondria to the matrix after fertilization, where it proceeds to degrade or eliminate paternal mtDNA. A defect in such an EndoG-like pathway in humans might produce a paternal contribution, thus explaining a possible mechanism for biparental inheritance.
