= Co-Extra =

EU-funded crop research programme

Co-Extra was an EU-funded research programme on co-existence and traceability of genetically modified crops and their edible derivatives that ran from 2005-2009. It was granted €13.5 million under the Sixth Framework Programme of the European Union, and is conducted by more than 200 scientists in 52 organisations in 18 countries.

== Research goals ==
The research programme studied and validated biological containment methods, forged supply chain organisations, and provided practical tools and methods for implementing co-existence between GMO-based (i.e., based on the use of genetically modified organisms) and non-GMO-based supply chains.

With regard to supporting cost-effective documentary traceability, Co-Extra was aimed at devising reliable, analytical detection methods, and at establishing the most appropriate methods of collecting, organising and distributing information. A core programme objective was the provision, to all stakeholders of food and feed chains, of a central decision-support system incorporating all necessary institutional tools, methods, models and guidelines.

== Work packages ==
The programme was structured in eight work packages (WP):

- WP 1: Biology approaches for gene flow mitigation
- WP 2: Supply chain analysis, description and modelling
- WP 3: Economic costs and benefits of co-existence and traceability
- WP 4: Development testing and sampling approaches
- WP 5: Development and integration of analytical traceability tools
- WP 6: Technical challenges of GMO detection
- WP 7: Integration with respect to legal, scientific, social and ethical issues
- WP 8: Dialogue and communication

== Dissemination of research results ==
The editorial team of WP 8 presented all findings on the programme's website (no longer in existence as of 2014), which had been written and designed for an audience of stakeholders and interested lay persons. The website also supplied background information on the public debate on co-existence and traceability in many EU countries, as well as on the current status of implementation of co-existence and traceability legislation and measures.
