= Biocontainment of genetically modified organisms =

Measures to prevent genetically modified plants and animals from entering the gene pool

Since the mid 1970s, laws have been adopted to mitigate potential dangers of genetic engineering. Many countries have laws designed to control the use of genetically modified organisms (GMOs) including laws and regulations prevent genetic exchange between GMOs and non-GMOs in the wild. Many regulations regarding GMOs are concerned with genetically modified crops and ensuring patented genes do not interbreed with non-modified agricultural products.

== Overview ==
In 1975 several prominent biochemists and biologists held the Asilomar Conference on Recombinant DNA at Asilomar State Beach. The conference leaders proposed that the containment of a modified organism should be done to prevent the introduction of a possible biohazard into the natural world, and that the effectiveness of the containment should match the estimated risk. Consumers in many countries are skeptical of genetically modified (GM) crops and organisms, despite a scientific consensus that GM crops pose no greater risk than traditionally cultivated crops.

The European Union has regulations specifically governing co-existence and traceability of GM products. Within the European Union, since 2001, conventional and organic food and feedstuffs can contain up to 0.9% of authorised GM material without being labelled GM (any trace of non-authorised GM products would cause shipments to be rejected). In the United States GM products are regulated by a variety of organizations including the FDA, EPA, and USDA's APHIS. Disputes regarding windblown or animal transported seeds are resolved by the legal tort system, governed by state law, to manage risks of co-existence.

The majority of bioengineered crops approved for sale worldwide are crops, grow for feed, food, or fuel. However, a number of genetically modified animals (like GalSafe pigs) and -bacteria are either available for purchase or use. GM bacteria was first developed to make insulin and the GloFish has been available for purchase in the United States since 2003. In some instances, like with GM bacteria used to make insulin, strict laws exists to prevent the accidental release of an organism into the wild. Growth medium containing GMB must be deactivated (i.e. killed) and disposed of. Conversely, while laws regarding the release of non-native animals apply to GM species, GM species like the GloFish have no specific additional limitations of their containment in the United States.

In the context of agriculture and food and feed production, co-existence means using cropping systems with and without genetically modified crops in parallel. In some countries, such as the United States, co-existence is not governed by any single law but instead is managed by regulatory agencies and tort law. In other regions, such as Europe, regulations require that the separation and the identity of the respective food and feed products must be maintained at all stages of the production process. There is ample evidence to suggest that GM seeds, like all other agricultural seeds, can be transported outside of their intended planting area through animals, plants, admixture with improperly cleaned or maintained transportation/storage equipment.

== Containment measures ==
The measures used to contain GM material is similar to methods used to contain non-GM material. In a laboratory, biocontainment of GM bacterial or viral material includes using an airlock, autoclave, following standard bacterial or viral decontamination procedures, fume hoods, wearing personal protective equipment, and following other appropriate biosafety level procedures. GM organisms can be modified to have a terminator gene which prevents the seeds from reproducing using a variety of methods.

For GM crops and plants being planted and cultivated in a commercial setting, containment is similar to non-GM products and is generally limited to avoiding admixture of GM and non-GM seeds. Machinery and storage must be thoroughly cleaned, distance kept between fields where pollination is a concern, and the accidental spilling of seeds should be minimized.

Some organic horticulturists use "pollen barriers" to attempt actively catch pollen from GM plants and prevent the cross pollination of GM and non-GM species grown near each other (e.g., Corn, Canola, etc.). It generally consists of hedges and trees which physically hinder pollen movement.

Researchers have investigated methods to prevent GM crops from producing pollen (i.e., male-sterile plants) and GM crops with pollen that does not contain genetically engineered material. This would allow a transplastomic plant to be generated in which the genetic modification has been integrated in the DNA of chloroplasts. Since chloroplasts of plants are maternally inherited, the transgenes are not spread by pollen thus achieving biological containment. The cell nucleus would thus contains no transgene and the pollen would contain no chloroplasts or transgenes.

== Regulation and policy ==
The development of a regulatory framework concerning genetic engineering began in 1975, at Asilomar, California. The first use of Recombinant DNA (rDNA) technology had just been successfully accomplished by Stanley Cohen and Herbert Boyer two years previously and the scientific community was concerned about the possibility "novel types of infectious DNA elements" and their unpredictable effects. The Asilomar meeting recommended a set of guidelines regarding the cautious use of recombinant technology and any products resulting from that technology. In 1976 the US National Institute of Health (NIH) formed a rDNA advisory committee. This was followed by other regulatory offices (the United States Department of Agriculture (USDA), Environmental Protection Agency (EPA) and Food and Drug Administration (FDA)), effectively making all rDNA research tightly regulated in the USA.

In 1982 the Organisation for Economic Co-operation and Development (OECD) released a report into the potential hazards of releasing genetically modified organisms into the environment as the first transgenic plants were being developed. As the technology improved and genetically organisms moved from model organisms to potential commercial products the USA established a committee at the Office of Science and Technology (OSTP) to develop mechanisms to regulate the developing technology. In 1986 the OSTP assigned regulatory approval of genetically modified plants in the US to the USDA, FDA and EPA.

The Cartagena Protocol on Biosafety was adopted on 29 January 2000 and entered into force on 11 September 2003. It is an international treaty that governs the transfer, handling, and use of genetically modified (GM) organisms. It is focussed on movement of GMOs between countries and has been called a de facto trade agreement. One hundred and fifty-seven countries are members of the Protocol and many use it as a reference point for their own regulations.

In the face of continuing concerns about the economic losses that might be suffered by organic farmers by unintended intermixing, the U.S. Secretary of Agriculture convened an Advisory Committee on Biotechnology and 21st Century Agriculture (AC21) to study the issue and make recommendations as to whether to address these concerns and if so, how. economic losses to farmers caused by unintended presence of genetically engineered materials, as well as how such mechanisms might work. The members of AC21 included representatives of the biotechnology industry, the organic food industry, farming communities, the seed industry, food manufacturers, State government, consumer and community development groups, the medical profession, and academic researchers. The AC21 recommended that a study should be conducted to answer the question of whether and to what extent there are any economic losses to US organic farmers; recommended that if the losses are serious, that a crop insurance program for organic farmers be put in place, and that an education program should be undertaken to ensure that organic farmers are putting appropriate contracts in place for their crops and that neighboring GM crop farmers are taking appropriate containment measures. Overall the report supported a diverse agriculture system in which many different farming systems could co-exist.

=== Compensation for failure to maintain separation ===
Since GM-free products yield higher prices in many countries, some governments have introduced limits for the mixing of both production systems, with compensation for non-GM farmers for economic losses in cases where mixing inadvertently occurred. One tool for compensation is a liability fund, to which all GM farmers, and sometimes GM seed producers, contribute. After a notable event in Western Australia where a certified organic farm lost a voluntary certification after reporting GM canola growing in some areas of his farm, a Parliamentary Inquiry considered six proactive proposals for compensating organic farms who's stock was "tainted" by GM canola, however the Inquiry did not recommend a particular mechanism of compensation.

== Notable escapes ==
=== 1990s ===
In 1999 scientists in Thailand claimed they discovered glyphosate-resistant genetically modified wheat that was not yet approved for release in a grain shipment from the Pacific Northwest of the United States, even though transgenic wheat had never been approved for sale and was only ever grown in test plots. Later testing showed that no GM wheat was present, only debris from GM corn, probably shipped in the container on a previous occasion.

==== Percy Schmeiser ====
In 1998 Monsanto sued Percy Schmeiser for growing "Roundup Ready Canola" (canola genetically modified to be resistant to Roundup) without a paying their $15/acre license fee. Schmeiser claimed he had initially discovered that some canola growing by a roadside along one of his fields was Roundup resistant in 1997, after he was killing weeds along the public road. Following the discovery, he sprayed a 3- to 4‑acre unused area adjacent to his field which contained a number of volunteer canola plants. Schmeiser said in court that about 60% of the volunteer canola survived. Once that canola went to seed, he harvested the seeds, had them cleaned at a commerical facility, and used them to seed 1,030 acres of his fields in the 1998 growing season. After receiving several tips, Monsanto company representative took samples from the right of way along of Schmeiser's fields and determined all the samples contained a genetic marker for "Roundup Ready Canola". Monsanto then sued Schmeiser for refusing to pay their fee. Court ordered testing showed "the presence of the patented gene in a range of 95-98% of the canola sampled". Schmeiser claimed that in 1996 "wind or insects, seed blown from passing trucks, or dropping from farm equipment, or swaths blown from neighbours’ fields" caused the seeds to end up on his property and that he owned the harvest and was entitled to do with it whatever he wished, including saving the seeds from the 1997 harvest and planting them in 1998. The case (Monsanto Canada Inc v Schmeiser) went to the Supreme Court of Canada which held for Monsanto by a 5‑4 vote in late May 2004. The case is widely cited or referenced by the anti-GM community in the context of a fear of a company claiming ownership of a farmer's crop based on the inadvertent presence of GM pollen grain or seed.

=== 2000s ===
In 2000, Aventis StarLink corn, which had been approved only as animal feed due to concerns about possible allergic reactions in humans, was found contaminating corn products in U.S. supermarkets and restaurants. This corn became the subject of a widely publicized recall, when Taco Bell taco shells were found to contain the corn, eventually resulting in the recall of over 300 products. It was the first-ever recall of a genetically modified food. The registration for the Starlink varieties was voluntarily withdrawn by Aventis in October 2000.

In 2005, scientists at the UK Centre for Ecology and Hydrology reported the first evidence of horizontal gene transfer of pesticide resistance to weeds, in a few plants from a single season; they found no evidence that any of the hybrids had survived in subsequent seasons.

In 2006, American exports of rice to Europe were interrupted when the U.S. crop was contaminated with rice containing the LibertyLink modification, which had not been approved for release. An investigation by the USDA's Animal and Plant Health Inspection Service (APHIS) was unable to determine the cause of the contamination.

In 2007, the U.S. Department of Agriculture fined Scotts Miracle-Gro $500,000 when for failing to properly clean equipment and maintain a buffer zone around it's GM creeping bentgrass.

In 2009 the government of Mexico created a regulatory pathway for approval of genetically modified maize, but because Mexico is the center of diversity for maize, concerns have been raised about the effect that genetically modified maize could have on local strains. A 2001 report in Nature presented evidence that Bt maize was cross-breeding with unmodified maize in Mexico, although the data in this paper was later described as originating from an artifact and Nature stated that "the evidence available is not sufficient to justify the publication of the original paper". A subsequent large-scale study, in 2005, failed to find any evidence of contamination in Oaxaca. However, other authors have stated that they also found evidence of cross-breeding between natural maize and transgenic maize.

=== 2010s ===
A study published in 2010 in PLOS One showed that about 83 percent of wild or weedy canola found along major roadsides in North Dakota tested contained the patented CP4 EPSPS protein. In Australia, during a 2010 planting of Monsanto's Roundup-Ready canola on one farm, some feeds blew several meters to neighboring organic farm. After a harvest of his non-GM canola crop, organic farmer Steve Marsh reached out to the National Association for Sustainable Agriculture Australia (NASAA), who managed his organic certification. After visiting Marsh's farm and determining five of the sampled plants contained the CP4-EPSPS protein, the NASAA suspended Marsh's certification and acknowledged the contamination was not his fault. Marsh sued the neighboring farm who planted the GM canola, since he was forced to sell his mostly organic crop at the same price as conventional canola, but in 2014 a judge called it an "incursion" and rejected claims for nuisance, negligence and damages.

Between 2013 and 2019 several different varieties of glyphosate-resistant genetically modified wheat that was not yet approved for release were detected at least five times in North America. The wheat varieties had been created by Monsanto, and were strains that was field-tested from 1998 to 2005 and was in the American regulatory approval process before Monsanto withdrew it based on concern that importers would avoid the crop, which had been declared safe for consumption in the USA.

In 2013 one strain of genetically modified wheat (MON71800) was discovered in a farm in Oregon, growing as a weed or "volunteer plant". The last field test in Oregon had occurred in 2001. Volunteer wheat from a field two miles away owned by the same farmer and planted with the same seed was tested and it was not found to be glyphosate-resistant. Monsanto was liable for fines of up to $1 million, if violations of the Plant Protection Act were found. According to Monsanto it was "mystified" by its appearance, having destroyed all the material it held after completing trials in 2004 and because they did not think that seed left in the ground or pollen transfer could account for it. In June of 2013 Robb Fraley, an executive vice president and chief technology officer at Monsanto suggested that the presence of the wheat was likely an act of sabotage. That claim was not repeated in the official press release issued after the USDA's final report on the Oregon farm. The discovery could have threatened U.S. wheat exports, which totaled $8.1 billion in 2012; the US is the world's largest wheat exporter. New Scientist reported that the variety of wheat was rarely imported into Europe and doubted that the discovery of the wheat would affect Europe, but more likely destined for Asia. As a result of the discovery of the unapproved strain, Japan and South Korea halted wheat orders from the United States, leaving wheat growers in neighboring communities unable to decide what to plant next season. The crop growing when the genetically modified wheat was discovered had already been sold or insured. On June 14, 2013, the USDA announced: "As of today, USDA has neither found nor been informed of anything that would indicate that this incident amounts to more than a single isolated incident in a single field on a single farm. All information collected so far shows no indication of the presence of GE [sic] wheat in commerce." As of August 30, 2013, while the source of the GM wheat remained unknown, Japan, South Korea and Taiwan had all resumed placing orders, and the export market resumed. The Oregon wheat commissioner, Blake Rowe, said that "the overall economic impact has been minimal".

In 2014 plants found to be glyphosate-resistant genetically modified wheat were found at the Southern Agricultural Research Center in Montana. The lab has previously tested the strain which was discovered between 2000 and 2003. The source of contamination was not located.

On June 14, 2016 a Washington farmer discovered 22 plants of Monsanto's MON 71700 strain of genetically modified wheat containing the CP4 EPSPS protein growing in his field. The variety was tested between 1998 and 2001, and the field had been unused since Spring of 2015. The exact source of the contamination was never discovered. Korea and Japan temporarily suspended the importation of wheat from the USA, which ended in August of 2016. After an investigation by the USDA and a full examination of the harvested wheat, it was determined there was no evidence any GM wheat containing the was harvested or entered the food supply.

== See also ==
- Biological patent
- Genetic pollution
- Roundup Ready
- StarLink corn recall
