= Maize milling =

Processing of corn for consumption as food

Maize miller is the processing of maize (corn) for safe and palatable consumption as food. Processing can be by machine-milling in either large- or small-scale mills, or by hand-milling in domestic or community settings.

The maize is first cleaned and then "conditioned", or "tempered", by soaking the kernels in water. This facilitates the separation of the seed coat and pericarp from the endosperm. Further processing consists of separating components of the grain, and grinding it into various grades.

== Cleaning and conditioning ==
Cleaning and conditioning of the maize is an important step in the process and refers to the removal of foreign material and all that is not maize kernels from the to-be milled grain that lowers the quality of the product such as husk, straw, dust, sand, and everything too big or too small and lighter than a maize kernel.

It also refers to the removal of poisonous seeds, and material harmful to the milling equipment such as metal and stones. Conditioning refers to the addition of moisture to the maize to allow the bran to be peeled off in flakes during milling with plate or roller mills, allowing easy separation in a sifter and, most importantly, to add mass to the meal.

== Milling and sifting ==
Following this process, milling can commence and may take several forms:

- The roller mill may be a single roller mill, double roller mill or pneumatic roller mill. In a complete maize milling plant, there are several roller mills that work together, they have different functions, the first mill mainly peeling the maize skin, the second and third will grind the maize into granular sizes, and meanwhile to get some super fine flour, and the granular sized product will go to the next mill to continue grinding.
- While grinding time, use double bin sifter or square plan sifter to sift the meal from the miller, classification and sifting more super flour. In general, the sifting used to separate the flour and bran, also separate large size and small size to ensure flour quality.

== Final product packing ==
After the maize is processed, it will come out in different final products like flour and grits. They are different from their granular size. For the packing, a Full-auto Flour Packing Machine is adopted, and the flour is packed into 5 kg, 10 kg, 25 kg or 50 kg bags.

== Best quality maize ==
The best quality maize meal is therefore obtained by:

De-germinating the maize prior to milling Milling with rollers rather than hammer mills or plate mills/disc mills. Alternatively, if the budget is small, the whole maize, after cleaning and conditioning, may be milled by means of the plate mill only and then sifted (without de-germination). A significant part of the bran and germ meal would then be sifted off, resulting in a Special Sifted meal - of lower quality than roller milled meal and higher quality than hammer milled meal.

A further element of major importance is sifting. Milling and sifting, form the very essence of grain processing. The sifters in every system should be one or more of the following:

- Turbo sifters - two separation horizontally shafted with steel screens - high capacity but not sifting very fine - used in small capacity plate mill systems and as graders for samp and other primary grading after de-germinators.
- Rotary sifters - three separation horizontally shafted with nylon screens - lower capacity but very fine screening - used in small capacity plate mill systems.
- Mini plan sifters - relatively high capacity and very fine screening used as primary sifters for all mills of 1 ton per hour to 2.5 tons per hour.
- Plan sifters in various sizes and numbers of passages: Very high capacity and fine screening - used in all mills with capacity of 2.5 ton per hour and more.

Industrial type mills can be constructed over one level, two levels, three levels or more, as existing buildings determine or as practical as the solution may be. High capacity mills normally require more levels to make use of gravity in moving product between mills and sifters.

Another option is to place a small mill (500–1,000 kg/h) in a container. This is only recommended for special applications where buildings are problematic, where the mill needs to be moved from time to time to another location, where temporary power is used and where the mill is located in very remote areas.
