= SFU Stephens Family School of Medicine =

Medical school of Simon Fraser University in Surrey, British Columbia

- Type: Public medical school
- Established: 2024
- Affiliations: Simon Fraser University
- Dean: David J. Price
- Students: 48 (inaugural class, 2026)
- Location: Surrey, British Columbia, Canada
- Campus: Urban
- Website: [www.sfu.ca/medicine/](https://www.sfu.ca/medicine/)

The SFU Stephens Family School of Medicine is the medical school of Simon Fraser University (SFU), located in Surrey, British Columbia, Canada. SFU's Board of Governors formally approved the creation of the school in May 2024, and its inaugural class of 48 medical students began studies in August 2026. It is the first new medical school in western Canada since 1950.

The school offers a three-year, year-round Doctor of Medicine (MD) program. Its curriculum consists of 131 weeks of instruction and emphasizes community-based medical education and primary care. The school holds preliminary accreditation from the Committee on Accreditation of Canadian Medical Schools (CACMS).

In June 2026, the school was named the SFU Stephens Family School of Medicine following a $40-million donation from the Stephens family, founders of Nature's Path. The donation was reported as the largest single gift in Simon Fraser University's history.

== History ==
Plans for a medical school at Simon Fraser University were announced during the 2020 British Columbia general election campaign. The British Columbia New Democratic Party proposed establishing the school at SFU's Surrey campus as an additional source of medical education in the province alongside the UBC Faculty of Medicine.

The original proposal anticipated students beginning medical studies in the 2023–24 academic year. In November 2022, the provincial government announced that the planned opening had been delayed until 2026 and committed up to $4.9 million in start-up funding. Physician and medical educator Roger Strasser, the founding dean of the Northern Ontario School of Medicine, was retained by SFU as interim dean while the school was being developed.

In May 2024, Simon Fraser University's Board of Governors formally approved the creation of the School of Medicine. In July 2024, the provincial government announced $33.7 million in capital funding to develop interim teaching space, along with operating funding for the new school.

David J. Price was appointed the school's founding dean in July 2024. Price, a family physician, had previously held faculty and leadership positions in the Department of Family Medicine at McMaster University.

The school subsequently pursued accreditation through the Committee on Accreditation of Canadian Medical Schools (CACMS). In October 2025, it received preliminary accreditation and opened applications for its first class.

At the same time, plans were announced for a permanent medical-school facility in the Surrey City Centre Centre Block development, adjacent to SFU's Surrey campus and Surrey Central station. The permanent facility was projected to cost approximately $520 million, funded jointly by SFU and the provincial government, with completion planned for 2030.

On 5 June 2026, Ratana Stephens and Arran Stephens and their family donated $40 million to the school. The Stephens family founded the organic-food company Nature's Path. In recognition of the donation, the school was renamed the SFU Stephens Family School of Medicine.

The first cohort of 48 students began orientation at the school's interim Surrey facilities on 5 August 2026. The opening represented the first entirely new medical school established in Western Canada in more than half a century.

The inaugural class size is planned to increase in phases, with the school expected to reach an entering cohort of 120 medical students per year by 2035.

== Curriculum ==
The school awards the Doctor of Medicine degree. Its undergraduate medical program consists of 131 weeks of instruction over three years and operates throughout the year, including during the summer.

The curriculum is organized around three year-long required courses:

- MEDS 410 – Foundations of Medical Practice
- MEDS 420 – Extending Medical Practice
- MEDS 430 – Consolidation of Medical Practice

The program emphasizes community-based education and primary care. Teaching is provided by family physicians and other generalist physicians, with participation from specialist physicians, other health-care providers, researchers, Indigenous Elders and Knowledge Keepers.

Clinical education is designed to take place in community practices, clinics and hospitals as well as university teaching facilities. Although primary and community care are emphasized in the curriculum, graduates receive an MD degree and may pursue postgraduate residency training in the range of medical specialties.

== Admissions ==
The school's inaugural admissions cycle was held in 2025–26 for entry in August 2026. SFU received 1,864 applications, of which 1,697 were complete and met the school's academic eligibility requirements. Of those applicants, 205 were invited to a multiple mini-interview, and 48 students were admitted to the inaugural class.

For the inaugural admissions cycle, applicants could establish academic eligibility through specified grade-point-average and Medical College Admission Test thresholds. SFU stated that GPA and MCAT results above the applicable eligibility threshold did not provide an additional advantage in the admissions process. The applicant's undergraduate institution and field of study were also not ranking factors.

Of the 1,697 academically eligible applications, 447 were identified through an initial file review as meeting the school's mission and mandate. Because this exceeded the 205 available interview positions, an equal-probability selection process was used to select interviewees from that group.

The school offers an open admissions stream and an Indigenous admissions stream for eligible First Nations, Métis and Inuit applicants.

== Campus ==
The school's initial teaching facilities are located at SFU's Surrey campus in the SFU Surrey Central building and in nearby leased space. The interim campus is located in Surrey City Centre near Surrey Central SkyTrain station.

The permanent school is planned as part of the Centre Block development in Surrey City Centre, directly adjacent to the existing SFU Surrey campus and Surrey Central station. Construction was scheduled to begin in late 2026, with the permanent medical school expected to be ready for students in fall 2030.

The school is being developed in collaboration with the provincial government, the City of Surrey, the First Nations Health Authority, Fraser Health and medical organizations and practitioners in the region.

== Accreditation ==
The MD program holds preliminary accreditation from the Committee on Accreditation of Canadian Medical Schools (CACMS).

CACMS grants accreditation to Canadian programs leading to the MD degree. New medical schools progress through staged accreditation before becoming eligible for full accreditation.

== See also ==
- Simon Fraser University
- UBC Faculty of Medicine
- List of medical schools in Canada
- Medical education in Canada
- Healthcare in Canada
