= March Against Monsanto =

International protest movement

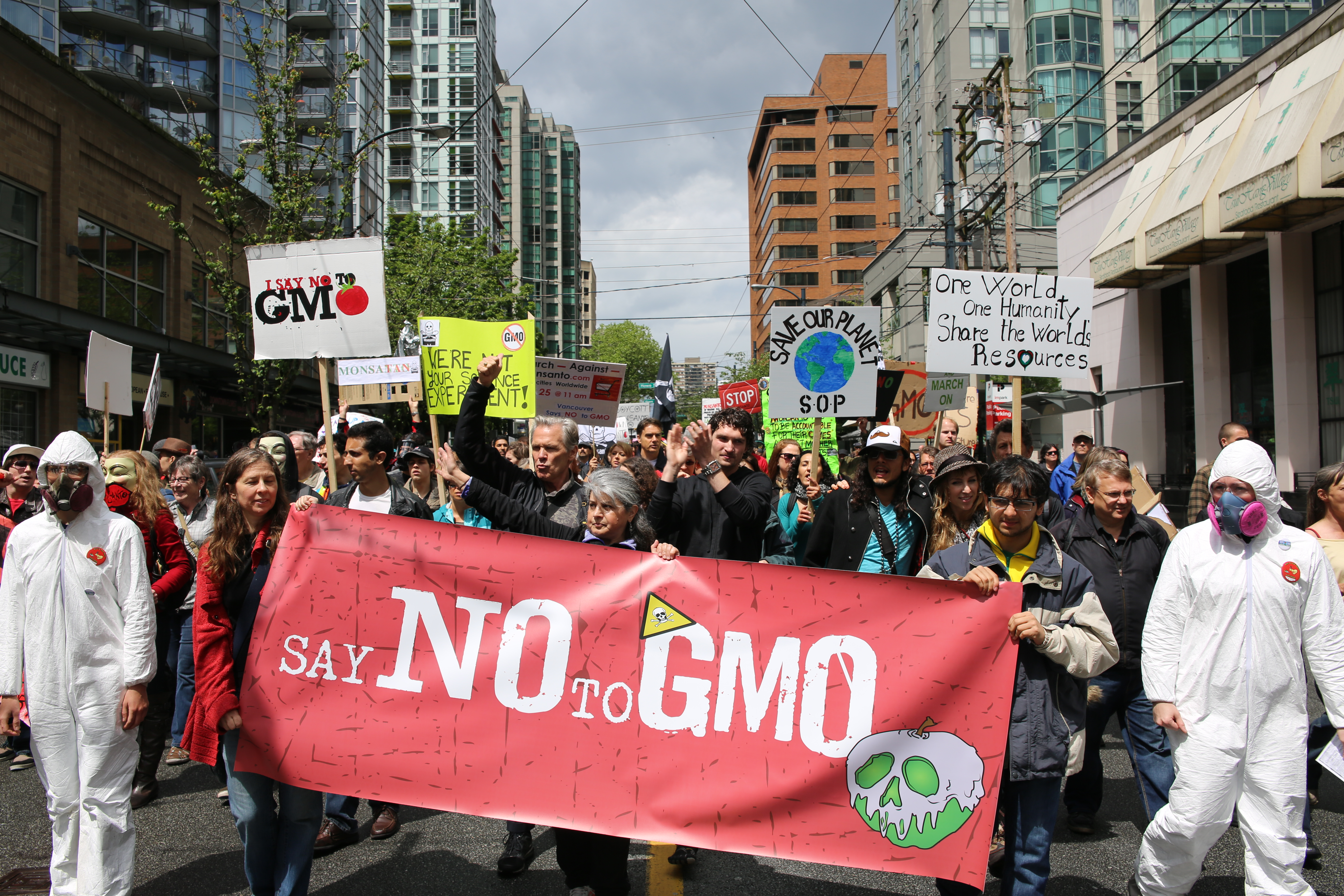
March Against Monsanto, Vancouver, Canada; May 25, 2013

The March Against Monsanto was an international grassroots movement and protest against Monsanto, a producer of genetically modified organisms (GMOs) and Roundup, a glyphosate-based herbicide. The movement was founded by Tami Canal in response to the failure of California Proposition 37, a ballot initiative which would have required labeling food products made from GMOs. Advocates support mandatory labeling laws for food made from GMOs.

The initial march took place on May 25, 2013. The number of protesters who took part is uncertain; figures of "hundreds of thousands" and the organizers' estimate of "two million" were variously cited. Events took place in between 330 and 436 cities around the world, mostly in the United States. Many protests occurred in Southern California, and some participants carried signs expressing support for mandatory labeling of GMOs that read "Label GMOs, It's Our Right to Know", and "Real Food 4 Real People". Canal said that the movement would continue its "anti-GMO cause" beyond the initial event. Further marches occurred in October 2013 and in May 2014 and May 2015.

The protests were reported by news outlets including ABC News, the Associated Press, The Washington Post, The Los Angeles Times, USA Today, and CNN (in the United States), and The Guardian (outside the United States).

Monsanto said that it respected people's rights to express their opinion on the topic, but maintained that its seeds improved agriculture by helping farmers produce more from their land while conserving resources, such as water and energy. The company reiterated that genetically modified foods were safe and improved crop yields.

== Background ==
Monsanto, headquartered in Creve Coeur, Missouri, is the largest producer of genetically engineered seed. Monsanto has been involved in high-profile lawsuits, as both plaintiff and defendant, and its current and former biotechnology products, its lobbying of government agencies, and its history as a chemical company have made it a controversial corporation. In the United States, the majority of corn, soybean, and cotton is genetically modified.

Prior to the march, Monsanto's CEO Hugh Grant had accused opponents of genetically modified foods of wanting to block others from choosing more affordable food options, thus being guilty of "elitism". Advocacy groups such as Greenpeace, The Non-GMO Project, and the Organic Consumers Association say that risks of GM food have not been adequately identified and managed, and they have questioned the objectivity of regulatory authorities. They have expressed concerns about the objectivity of regulators and the rigor of the regulatory process, possible contamination of non-GM foods, effects of GMOs on the environment and nature, and the consolidation of control of the food supply in companies that make and sell GMOs.

There is a scientific consensus that currently available food derived from GM crops poses no greater risk to human health than conventional food, but that each GM food needs to be tested on a case-by-case basis before introduction. Nonetheless, members of the public are much less likely than scientists to perceive GM foods as safe. The legal and regulatory status of GM foods varies by country, with some nations banning or restricting them, and others permitting them with widely differing degrees of regulation.

Although labeling of genetically modified organism (GMO) products in the marketplace is required in many countries, it is not required in the United States and no distinction between marketed GMO and non-GMO foods is recognized by the US FDA.

== Origin of the protests ==
=== Tami Canal ===
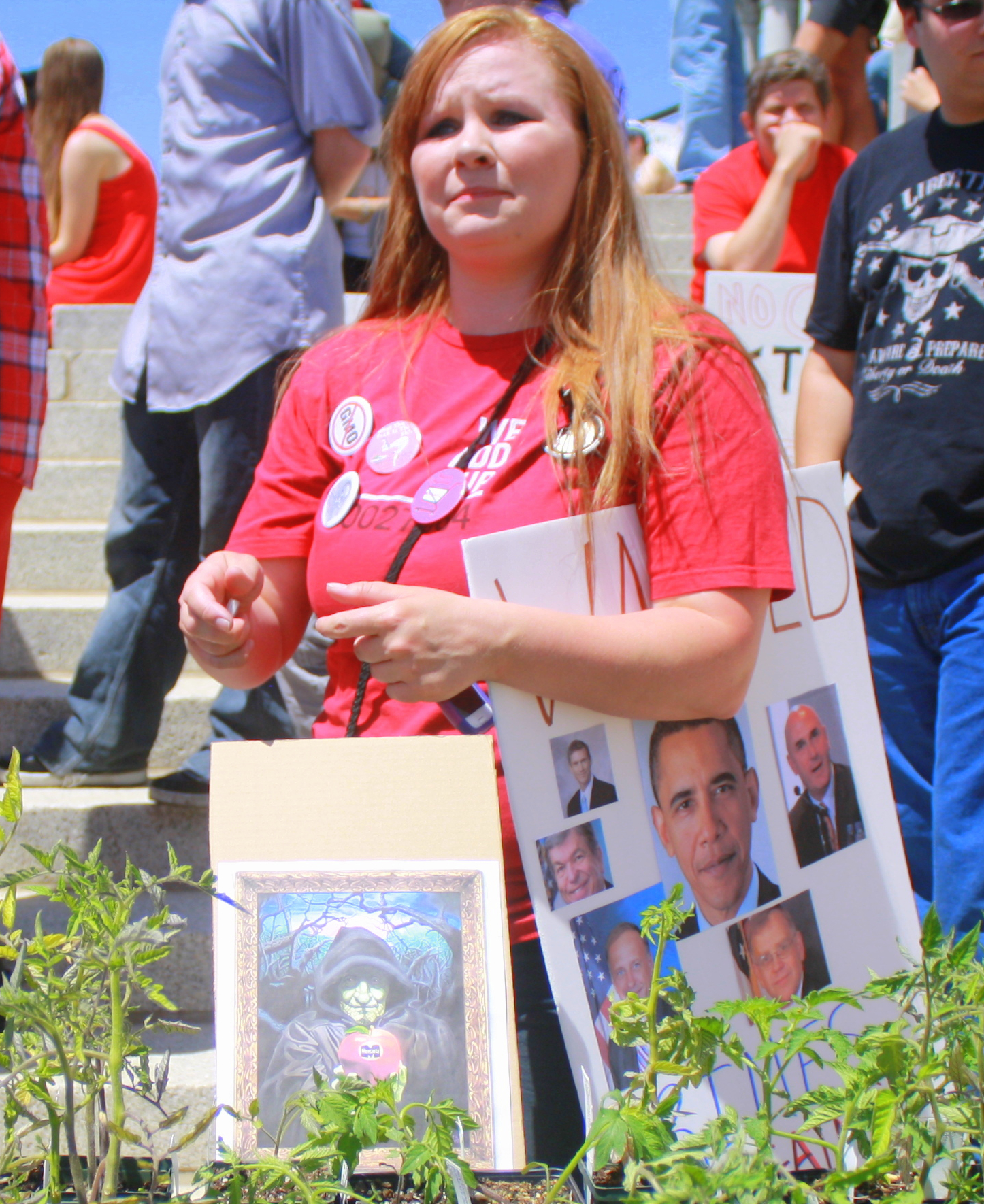
Founder Tami Canal, March Against Monsanto, Salt Lake City, Utah

Tami Monroe Canal, a homemaker and mother of two daughters, was living as a resident in California when Proposition 37, a ballot initiative that would have required labels on products containing genetically engineered food, was rejected by voters in November 2012. Monsanto spent $8.1 million opposing the passage of Proposition 37, making it the largest donor against the initiative. The combined total spent by food industry advocacy groups on the campaign to defeat Proposition 37 was $45 million. Canal credits Proposition 37 with "opening her eyes" to GMOs for the first time.

Soon after, Canal moved to Utah where she had difficulty finding the same kinds of fresh foods and farmers' markets she had left behind in California. Canal was not only angry about the failure of Proposition 37 and frustrated with trying to find reasonably priced organic food, but she was also concerned about the health of her children.

Talking about her personal motivations for starting the movement, Canal told the Salt Lake City Weekly, "Companies like Kellogg's and General Mills are putting things like Fruit Loops on the market that are basically 100 percent genetically engineered ingredients. And that's marketed to our kids." Out of her anger, frustration, and concerns for the health of her children, Canal developed the idea for a "March Against Monsanto" social media campaign.

=== Social media campaign ===
Canal started a Facebook social media campaign on February 28, 2013. She stated: "For too long, Monsanto has been the benefactor of corporate subsidies and political favoritism ... Organic and small farmers suffer losses while Monsanto continues to forge its monopoly over the world's food supply, including exclusive patenting rights over seeds and genetic makeup." Activists Emilie Rensink and Nick Bernabe worked with Canal to promote the march on various social media sites. By May 21, the Facebook page had attracted 85,000 members with approximately 110,000 "likes" and about 40,000 daily visitors.

=== The Farmer Assurance Provision ===
President Barack Obama's signing, on March 26, 2013, of the Farmer Assurance Provision, which is Section 735 of US H.R. 933, provided further motivation for the protesters. The section of the bill is called the "Monsanto Protection Act" by critics, and it authorizes the United States Department of Agriculture to allow the planting and cultivation of genetically modified food while environmental reviews are being completed, even if there is a legal ruling against their approval. Independent US Senator Bernie Sanders attempted, unsuccessfully, to introduce Senate Amendment 965 to the Agriculture Reform, Food, and Jobs Act of 2013, legislation that would require labeling of GM food products. Sanders criticized Monsanto for its opposition to his initiative, saying that Monsanto and other biotech companies "were able to gather a whole lot of support in the Senate".

Prior to the march, the March Against Monsanto group hosted an essay on their website highlighting what they saw as lack of attention to the Act in the mainstream media. Dave Murphy, founder of Food Democracy Now!, called the controversy over H.R. 933 "the turning point in the debate on political lobbying and genetic engineering in the U.S." and he described the March Against Monsanto as raising "one of the most pressing issues of our time".

== May 2013 protests ==
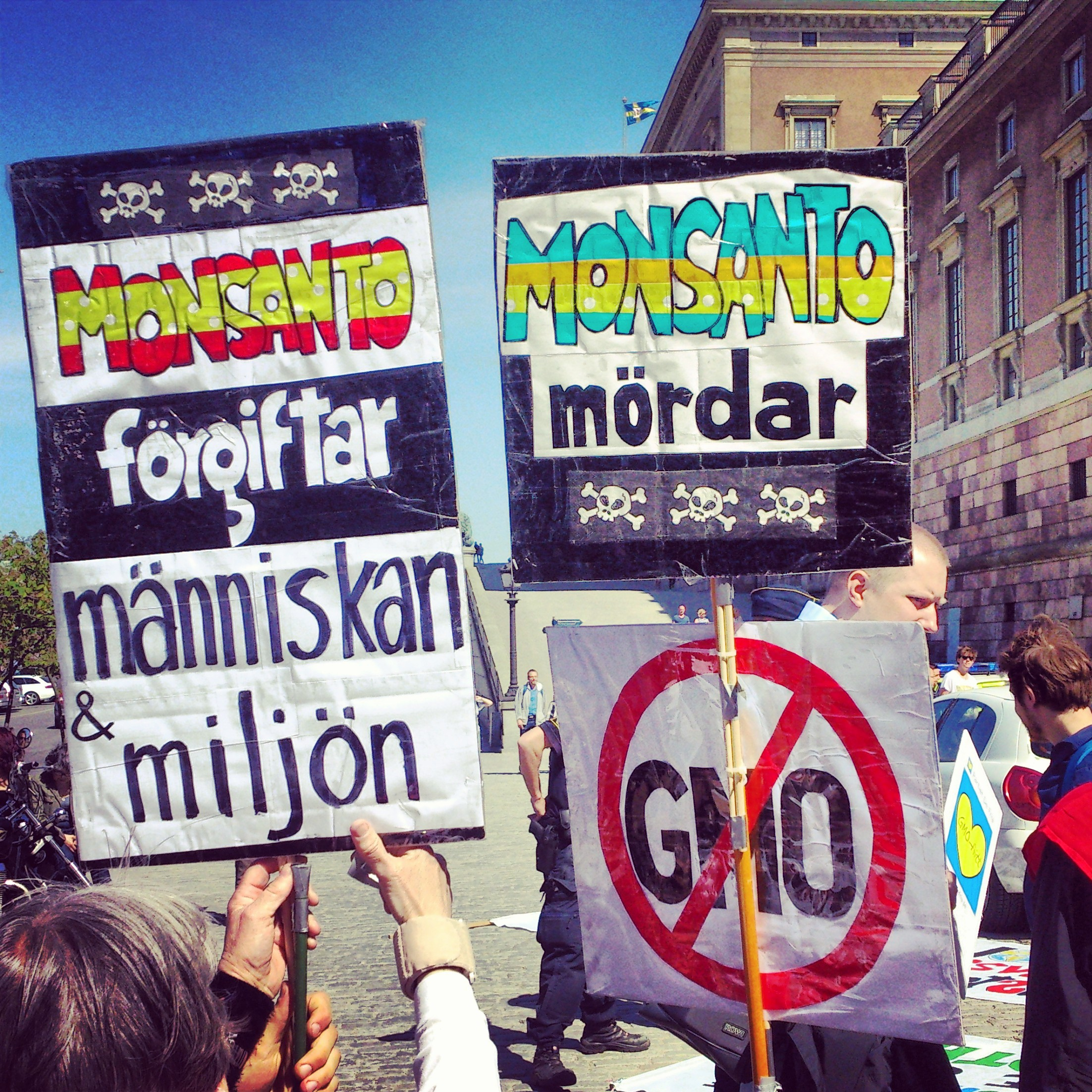
Protest signs from the March Against Monsanto, Stockholm, Sweden

On May 25, 2013, demonstrations protesting genetically modified crops took place around the world. Events took place in between 330 and 436 cities around the world, mostly in the United States. The number of protesters who took part is uncertain; figures of "hundreds of thousands" and the organizers' estimate of "two million" were variously cited.

In Southern California, protests occurred in Los Angeles, including Venice, Long Beach, and San Diego. In Los Angeles, protesters marched from Pershing Square to City Hall. Some carried signs expressing support for mandatory labeling of GMOs that read "Label GMOs, It's Our Right to Know", and "Real Food 4 Real People". Dorothy Muehlmann, organizer of the L.A. march, said that they were marching to raise awareness. "This is not just a 'boo Monsanto' protest. We want more people to know so they can make their own decisions."

Environmental journalist John Upton of Grist magazine noted that the march took place two days after Senate Amendment 965, introduced by US Senator Bernie Sanders in an attempt to allow states to label GMO foods, was rejected. "Any U.S. senators paying attention to what was happening in the entire world over the weekend may have noticed a teensy disconnect between their protectionist votes for Monsanto and global discontent with the GMO giant," Upton wrote.

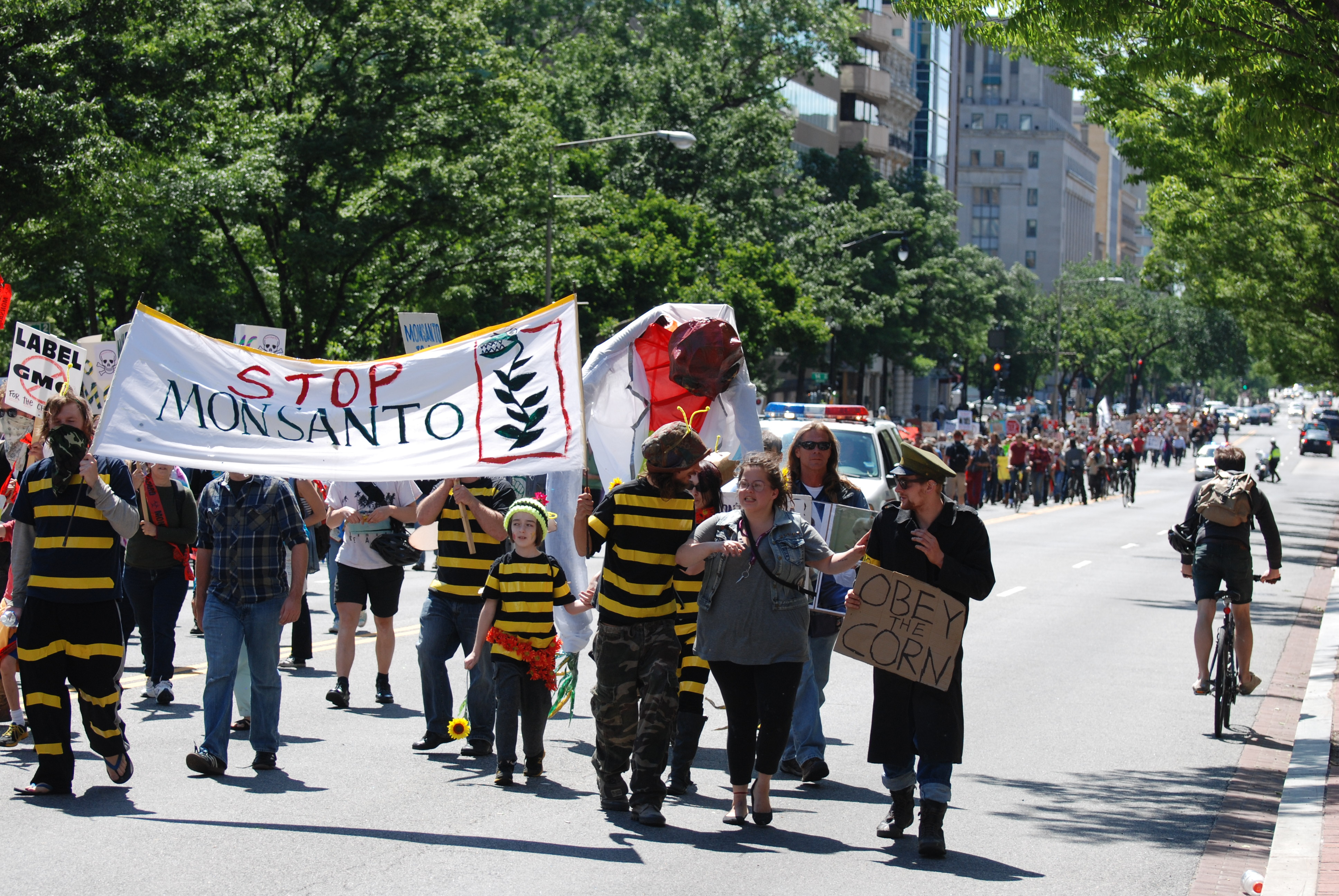
March Against Monsanto, Washington, DC

=== Positions ===
The March Against Monsanto published a list of concerns and its positions on a number of GMO issues on its website. According to the group, the protests were held to address health and safety issues, perceived conflicts of interest, and agricultural, environmental, and legislative concerns.

The marchers expressed the belief that GM foods can adversely affect human health, with some of the protesters asserting that such foods cause cancer, infertility, and birth defects. Protesters also asserted that GMOs might harm the environment, and play a role in declining bee populations.

The protesters argued that the Farmer Assurance Provision legislation allows Monsanto to ignore court rulings, and have called for the bill's repeal. They believe that the legislation has drawn what they call "a blurry line between industry and government".

They also believe that there has been a conflict of interest between former employees of Monsanto who work for the U.S. Food and Drug Administration, and that Monsanto has used their patent rights to create a monopoly of the food supply which has resulted in economic losses by small farmers. Activist and journalist Emilie Rensink, who helped organize the march, said that in her view the appointment of ex-Monsanto executives to head the FDA has resulted in political favoritism, including Monsanto subsidies which have given them an unfair advantage over small farmers.

=== Media coverage ===
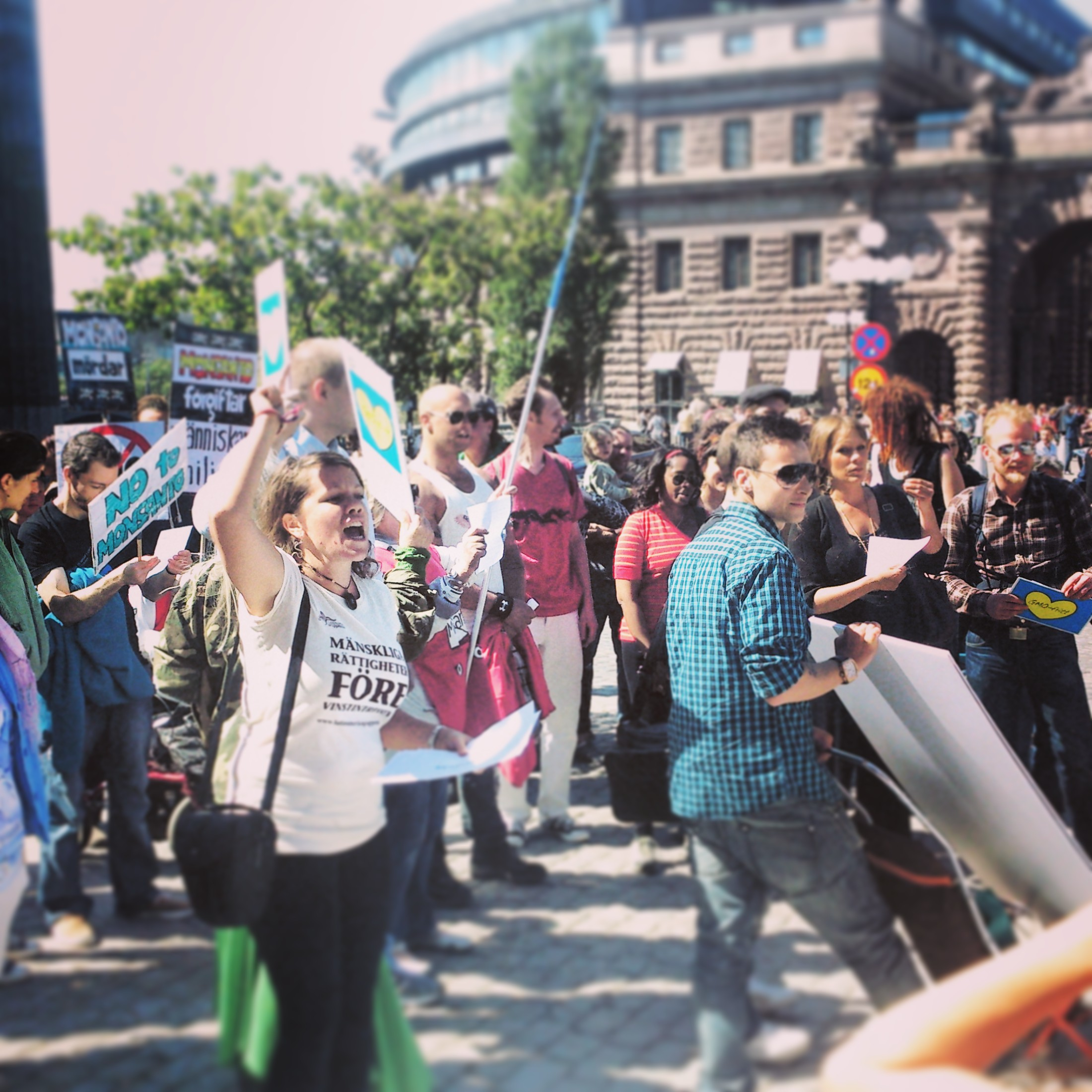
March Against Monsanto in Stockholm, Sweden, May 2013

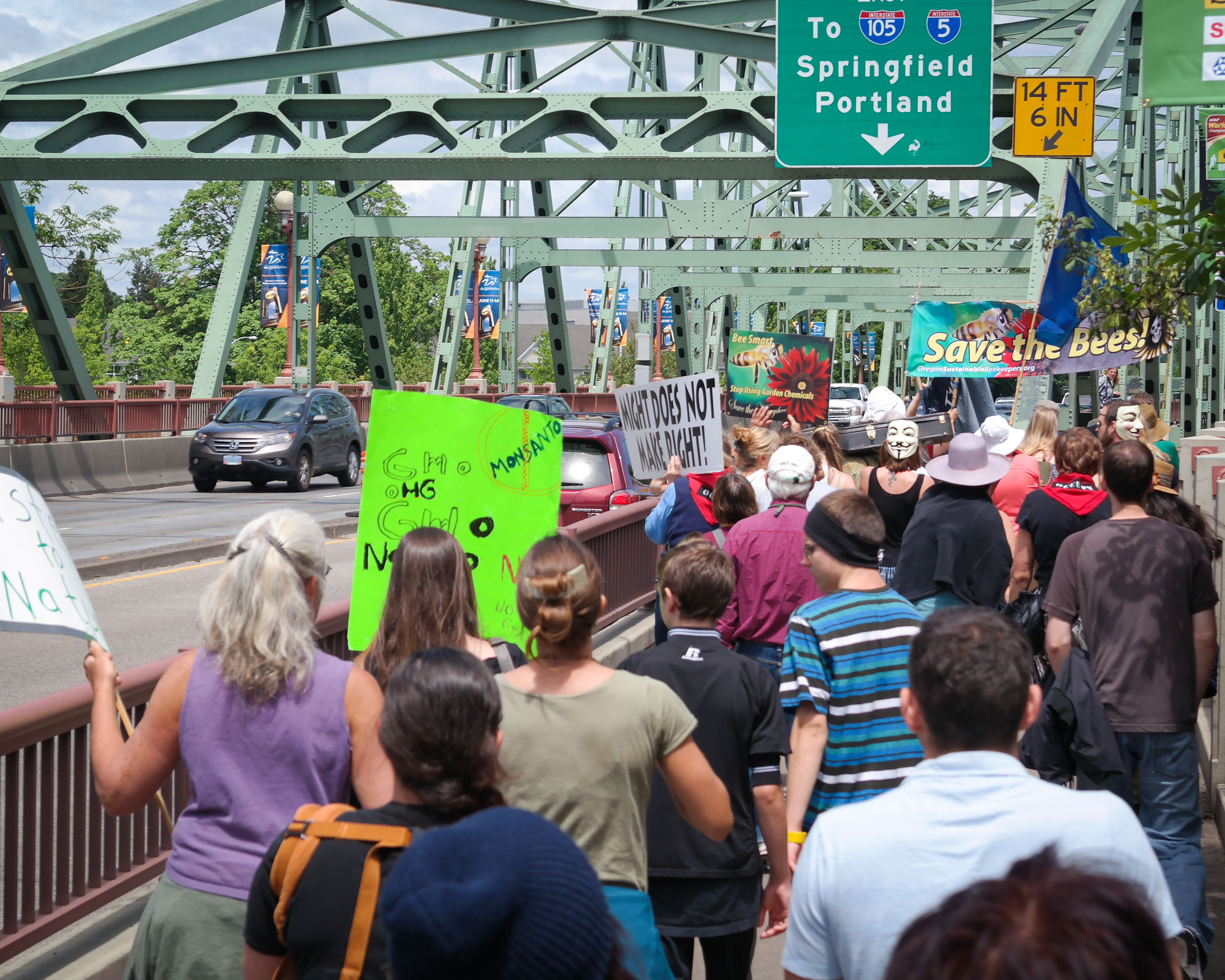
Eugene, Oregon, May 2014

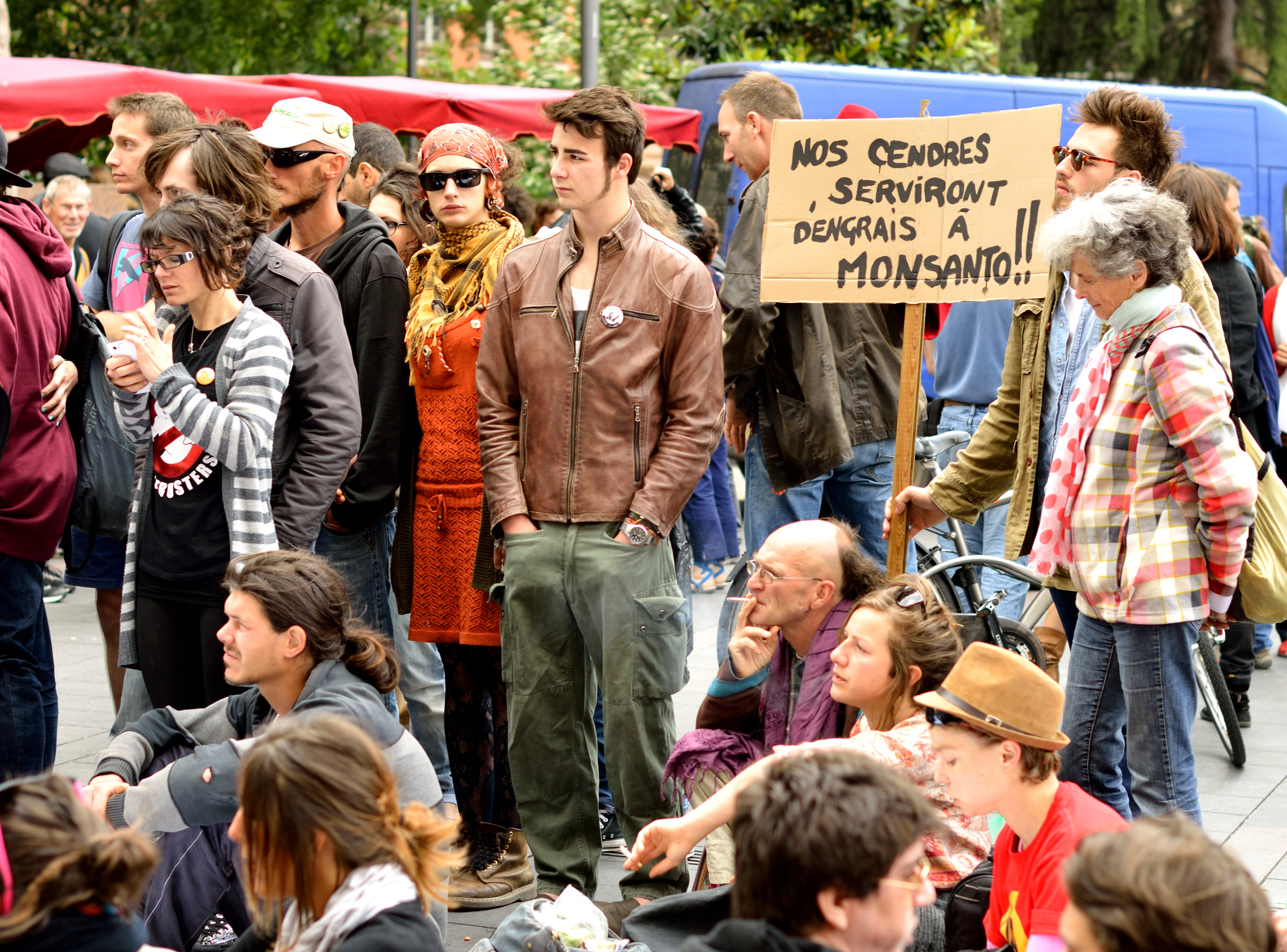
Toulouse, France, May 2015

The protests were reported on by news outlets including ABC News, the Associated Press, The Washington Post, The Los Angeles Times, USA Today, and CNN (in the United States), and The Guardian (outside the United States).

No major media outlets in the US provided live coverage of the event. AlterNet expressed the opinion that mainstream coverage of the event was "sparse", and it criticized what it characterized as "the mainstream media's decision to ignore thousands of people marching down the nation's busiest thoroughfares". Radio host Thom Hartmann compared what he saw as scant coverage of the protests, which he attributed to the media avoiding topics that might make their advertisers appear in a negative light, to the greater media attention garnered by small Tea Party rallies.

=== Monsanto and industry response ===
Monsanto said that it respected people's rights to express their opinion on the topic, but maintained that its seeds improved agriculture by helping farmers produce more from their land while conserving resources, such as water and energy. The company reiterated that genetically engineered foods were safe and improved crop yields. Similar sentiments were expressed by the Hawaii Crop Improvement Association, of which Monsanto is a member.

== October 2013 protests ==
A second protest was organized and held on October 12, 2013. The group Occupy Monsanto estimated that over 400 marches were held worldwide, with other reports estimating participation at 500 events in 50 different countries. The October march was scheduled to coincide with World Food Day, and came after Monsanto executives had been awarded the World Food Prize; the Des Moines, Iowa protest on October 12 took place in front of the World Food Prize building to oppose this award. Monsanto commented on the protests with a statement reasserting the safety of genetically modified food.

== Annual protests ==
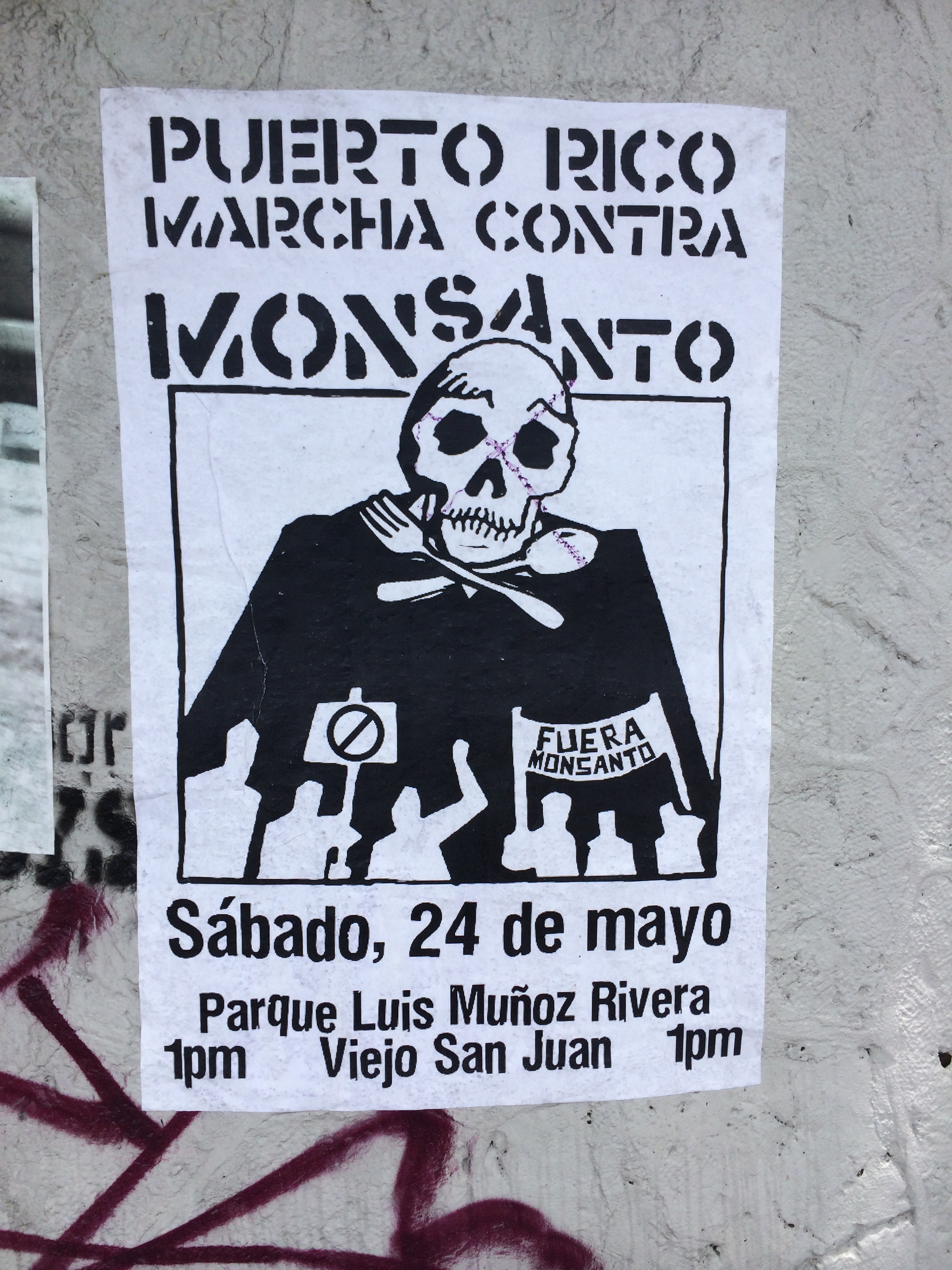
March Against Monsanto 2014 flyer in Old San Juan, Puerto Rico

Further protests were held in May 2014 and in "upwards of 400 cities in more than 40 countries" in May 2015.

== Opposition and counter protests ==
March Against Myths About Modification (MAMyths) is a grassroots organization set up to counter the March Against Monsanto protests, and the associated myths told about Genetically Engineered (GMO) crops and foods. MAMyths believes that the misconceptions associated with GMO's are harmful to the public because they influence public perception, which in turn influences policy.

== See also ==
- Organic Consumers Association and its campaign, "Millions Against Monsanto"
