= Food Democracy Now! =

- Founded: 2008
- Founder: Dave Murphy; Lisa Stokke
- Type: Non-profit; NGO
- Purpose: Food politics, sustainable agriculture, Genetic modification advocacy.
- Location: Iowa, United States
- Region served: United States
- Members: 650,000
- Key people: Dave Murphy; Lisa Stokke; Paul Willis; Aaron Woolf
- Website: fooddemocracynow.org

Food Democracy Now! is a grassroots movement and non-governmental organisation founded in 2008 and based in Iowa. The organization aims to promote a sustainable food system that protects the natural environment, supports farmers, and nourishes families.

Food Democracy Now! was founded by activists Dave Murphy and Lisa Stokke, and its members organize online campaigns and in-person actions across the United States.

The organization has focused on lobbying, litigation, labeling ballot initiatives, and public relations efforts surrounding issues such as organic and GMO coexistence, and campaigns against corporate control of agriculture and food.

In its early days, Food Democracy Now! launched a campaign to demonstrate public support for twelve candidates for undersecretary appointments in the U.S. Department of Agriculture who shared the organization's goals. The campaign attracted nearly 100,000 signatures of support.

The movement has been active in supporting small farmers, advocating for GMO labeling, and opposing the Farmer Assurance Provision, which is often referred to as the "Monsanto Protection Act" by anti-GMO activists, and the genetic modification of foods.
