= Godfrey Stephens =

Canadian artist (born 1939)

- Born: Godfrey Rupert Cripps Stephens; 28 October 1939 (age 86); Duncan, British Columbia, Canada
- Education: Self-taught
- Known for: Painter; Wood carving; Boat building
- Website: www.godfreysart.com

Godfrey Rupert Cripps Stephens (born 28 October 1939) is a Canadian artist, best known for his protest sculpture Weeping Cedar Woman and large abstract wooden columns. His painting and sculpting style combines West Coast iconography from First Nations references to classical Greek and nautical elements. He is also a wooden boat builder.

== Life and work ==
Godfrey Stephens was born in Duncan, British Columbia. As a boy, he began an influential relationship with First Nations carver Chief Mungo Martin and Tony Hunt and began carving. He dropped out of school at the age of 14. Mostly self-taught, living on his boats, Godfrey has painted and sculpted his whole life with no other occupation In 1973, the 24 foot tall abstract cedar columns were inaugurated at Victoria's Times Colonist Press buildings where they currently stand In 1971, at a ceremony to inaugurate the Pacific Rim Park, then Federal Parks Minister Jean Chretien presented Princess Anne with a small wooden abstract carving the Parks Board commissioned from Godfrey. In 1984, Godfrey carved Weeping Cedar Woman to protest the logging of the ancient trees of Clay'quot Sound. The 18 foot tall protest piece stayed on Strawberry Island for 17 years and is currently in Tofino, British Columbia. Godfrey has produced a large body of work including paintings, sculptures and sailing vessels. Godfrey is the older brother of Nature's Path Foods founder Arran Stephens.

== Books and media ==
Godfrey and his art have appeared in several books, magazines, newspapers, and blogs. Lloyd Kahn credits Godfrey as the inspiration for his popular book Builders of the Pacific Coast by Shelter Publications. The book Wood Storms, Wild Canvas: The Art of Godfrey Stephens by Gurdeep Stephens focuses exclusively on highlights of Godfrey's art, with photos of over 100 carvings, paintings and sailing vessels. Wood Storms, Wild Canvas won a Gold Medal for regional non-fiction in the 2015 19th Annual Independent Publisher Book Awards also known as the IPPY Awards.
