= 2012 California Proposition 37 =

Rejected GMO law

Proposition 37
- Genetically Engineered Foods Labeling

Results
Choice	Votes	%
Yes	6,088,713	48.59%
No	6,442,370	51.41%
Total votes	12,531,083	100.00%
Registered voters/turnout	18,245,970	68.68%
County results
No
70–80%
60–70%
50–60%
Yes
60–70%
50–60%

Proposition 37 was a California ballot measure rejected in California at the statewide election on November 6, 2012. This initiative statute would have required labeling of genetically engineered food, with some exceptions. It would have disallowed the practice of labeling genetically engineered food with the word "natural." This proposition was one of the main concerns by the organizers of the March Against Monsanto in May 2013.

== Details ==
Section 2 of Proposition 37, the "Statement of Purpose", reads "The purpose of this measure is to create and enforce the fundamental right of the people of California to be fully informed about whether the food they purchase and eat is genetically engineered and not misbranded as natural so that they can choose for themselves whether to purchase and eat such foods. It shall be liberally construed to fulfill this purpose".

The proposed law also includes several exceptions, such as products that are certified organic, made from animals fed or injected with genetically engineered material (but not genetically engineered themselves), processed with or containing only small amounts of genetically engineered ingredients, administered for treatment of medical conditions, sold for immediate consumption such as in a restaurant; and alcoholic beverages.

Grocery stores and other retailers would be primarily responsible for ensuring that their food products are correctly labeled. For foods that are exempt, retailers would have to provide records either directly from the provider of the product, or by receiving independent certification from third parties. Farmers, food manufacturers, and every other party in the product's supply chain would also have to maintain such records.

== Potential impact ==
According to the California Attorney General, the measure would "increase annual state costs ranging from a few hundred thousand dollars to over $1 million to regulate the labeling of genetically engineered foods". It would also incur "Potential, but likely not significant, costs to state and local governments due to litigation resulting from possible violations of the requirements of this measure. Some of these costs would be supported by court filing fees that the parties involved in each legal case would be required to pay under existing law."

== Arguments for and against ==
Proponents argue that "Proposition 37 gives us the right to know what is in the food we eat and feed to our families. It simply requires labeling of food produced using genetic engineering, so we can choose whether to buy those products or not. We have a right to know." Opponents argued that "Prop. 37 is a deceptive, deeply flawed food labeling scheme, full of special-interest exemptions and loopholes. Prop. 37 would: create new government bureaucracy costing taxpayers millions, authorize expensive shakedown lawsuits against farmers and small businesses, and increase family grocery bills by hundreds of dollars per year."

Opponents said Proposition 37 labeling requirements would increase grocery costs by as much as $400 per year based on a study by Northbridge Environmental Consultants and the non-partisan California Legislative Analyst's Office fiscal impact study.

Proponents on the other hand, said that some organic US food processors argued that the changes in labeling will have no effect on consumer costs because companies change their labeling all the time, as it is, and changing labels is a regular cost already built into the price consumers pay for products. “We, as with most manufacturers, are continually updating our packaging. It is a regular cost of doing business - a small one at that - and is already built into the price consumers pay for products,” said Arran Stephens, president and founder of Nature's Path.

Proponents believed that if the proposition is accepted in California, it would increase the likelihood that other states will also adopt the same rules. In turn, if enough states do decide to adopt GMO labeling laws, it is possible that the national government will become involved and take action.

Opponents claimed Prop 37 backers real intent was to ban GMOs via labeling schemes removing consumer choices, citing claims by proponents like Jeffrey M. Smith that labeling requirements in California would cause food companies to source only non-GMO foods to avoid having labels that consumers would perceive as warnings.

During the campaign, both sides made allegations of campaign improprieties.

== Campaign donations ==
The organization in support is "California Right to Know" and the organization against is "NO Prop. 37, Stop the Deceptive Food Labeling Scheme". As of November 6, 2012, the total donations to each side were $9.2 million in support, and $46 million in opposition. The top 10 donors to each side are as follows:

Supporters

- Mercola Health Resources $1,199,000
- Kent Whealy $1,000,000
- Dr. Bronner's Magic Soaps $620,883
- Nature's Path Foods $610,709
- Organic Consumers Fund $605,667
- Ali Partovi $288,975
- Mark Squire $258,000
- Wehah Farm $251,000
- Amy's Kitchen $200,000
- The Stillonger Trust (Mark Squire, Trustee) $190,000

Opponents

- Monsanto Company $8,112,867
- E.I. Dupont De Nemours & Co. $5,400,000
- PepsiCo, Inc. $2,585,400
- Grocery Manufacturers Association $2,002,000
- Kraft Foods $2,000,500
- BASF Plant Science $2,000,000
- Bayer Cropscience $2,000,000
- Dow AgroSciences $2,000,000
- Syngenta Corporation $2,000,000
- Coca-Cola North America $1,700,500

== Result ==
Proposition 37 was defeated, gaining 48.6% of voters at the polls in 2012. If it had passed, California would have been the first state to require GMO labeling.

== See also ==
- Genetically modified food
- Genetically modified food controversies
- Regulation of the release of genetic modified organisms
- Oregon Ballot Measure 27 (2002)
