= Medical school in Canada =

Medical education institutions in Canada

In Canada, a medical school is a faculty or school of a university that trains future medical doctors and usually offers a three- to five-year Doctor of Medicine (M.D.) or Doctor of Medicine and Master of Surgery (M.D., C.M.) degree. There are currently 18 medical schools in Canada with an annual admission success rate normally below 7.5%. As of 2021, approximately 11,500 students were enrolled in Canadian medical schools graduating 2,900 students per year.

Faculties of medicine at the University of Calgary, the Dalhousie University, the University of Manitoba, the McMaster University, the University of Toronto, and the University of Saskatchewan also offer a post-entry professional two-year bachelor or master's degree to train physician assistants.

== Admissions ==
Medical students generally begin their studies after receiving a bachelor's degree in another field, often one of the biological sciences. However, unlike their American counterparts, many Canadian medical schools have no science prerequisite courses. As a practical matter, nearly all successful applicants have completed one or more degrees before admission to a Canadian medical school. Despite this, the M.D. degree is considered to be a bachelor's degree-level qualification.

Not all medical schools in Canada require a bachelor's degree for entry. For example, Quebec's medical schools accept applicants after a two-year CEGEP diploma, which is the equivalent of other provinces' grade 12 plus the first year of university. Most faculties of medicine in Western Canada require at least 2 years, and most faculties in Ontario require at least 3 years of university study before application can be made to medical school. The University of Manitoba requires applicants to complete a prior degree before admission. The Association of Faculties of Medicine of Canada (AFMC) publishes a detailed guide on admission requirements for Canadian faculties of medicine on a yearly basis.

Admission offers are made by individual medical schools, generally on the basis of a personal statement, autobiographical sketch, undergraduate record (GPA), scores on the Medical College Admission Test (MCAT), and interviews. Medical schools in Quebec (Francophones and Anglophone alike), the University of Ottawa (a bilingual school), and the Northern Ontario School of Medicine (a school which promotes francophone culture), do not require the MCAT, as the MCAT has no French equivalent. Some schools, such as the University of Toronto and Queen's University, use the MCAT score as a cut-off, where sub-standard scores compromise eligibility. Other schools, such as the University of Western Ontario, give increasing preference to higher performance. McMaster University and the University of Calgary utilize the Critical Analysis and Reasoning section of the MCAT to determine interview eligibility and admission rank.

The annual success rate for Canadian citizens applying for admission to Canadian medical schools is normally below 7.5%. Around 2,900 positions were available in first-year classes in 2021-2022 across all seventeen Canadian faculties of medicine. The average tuition is $16,798 per year, with Ontario having the highest provincial average at $27,304. The level of debt among Canadian medical students upon graduation has received attention in the medical media.

== Curriculum ==
Generally, medical school in Canada takes 4 years. Notable exceptions include McMaster University and the University of Calgary, where programs run for 3 years, without interruption for the summer. McGill University and Université de Montréal both offer a five-year program that includes a medical preparatory year to entering CEGEP graduates. Université Laval offers a four- to-five-year program to all entering students.

The first half of the medical curriculum is dedicated mostly to teaching the fundamentals of medicine, such as anatomy, histology, physiology, pharmacology, genetics, microbiology, ethics, and epidemiology. This instruction can be organized by discipline or by organ system. Teaching methods include traditional lectures, problem-based learning, laboratory sessions, simulated patient sessions, and limited clinical experiences. The remainder of medical school is spent in clerkship. Clinical clerks participate in the day-to-day management of patients. They are supervised and taught during this clinical experience by residents and fully licensed staff physicians. Typical rotations include internal medicine, family medicine, psychiatry, surgery, emergency medicine, obstetrics and gynecology, and pediatrics. Elective rotations are often available so students can explore specialties of interest for residency training.

Some medical schools offer joint degree programs, in which a limited number of interested medical students may simultaneously enroll in M.Sc. or Ph.D. programs in related fields. Often this research training is undertaken during elective time and between the basic science and clinical clerkship halves of the curriculum. For example, while Université de Sherbrooke offers a M.D./M.Sc. program, McGill University offers a M.D./Ph.D. for medical students holding an undergraduate degree in a relevant field.

== Post-graduate medical education ==
Students enter into the Canadian Resident Matching Service (CaRMS) in the fall of their final year. Students rank their preferences of hospitals and specialties. In turn, the programs to which they applied rank each student. Both sets of rank lists are confidential. Each group's preferences are entered into a computerized matching system to determine placement for residency positions. 'Match Day' usually occurs in March, a few months before graduation. The length of post-graduate training varies with choice of specialty. Family medicine is a 2-year program accredited by the College of Family Physicians of Canada (CFPC), and third year programs of residency training are available in various areas of practice, including Emergency Medicine, Maternal/Child, Care of the Elderly, Palliative Care or Sports Medicine. All other medical specialty residencies are accredited by the Royal College of Physicians and Surgeons of Canada; most are 5 years long. Internal medicine and pediatrics are 4-year programs in which the final year can be used to complete a fellowship in general internal medicine or general pediatrics, or used towards a longer fellowship (e.g., cardiology). A few surgical residencies, including cardiac surgery, neurosurgery, and some general surgery programs, last 6 years. Sub-specialty fellowships are available after most residencies.

There are subtle differences between how residency training is organized in Canada as opposed to the United States. For example, M.D. graduates proceed directly into their residencies without the intermediate step of internship. However, this difference is somewhat superficial: for many residencies, the first postgraduate year (PGY1) in Canada is very similar to a rotating internship, with 1-2 month-long rotations in diverse fields. On the other hand, in Canada the graduate is often committed to a sub-specialty earlier than a similar American graduate.

Some sub-specialties are organized differently. For example, in the United States, cardiac and thoracic surgery are rolled into one fellowship (cardiothoracic surgery) following residency in general surgery. In Canada, cardiac surgery is a direct-entry residency (equivalent training can be obtained by pursuing a cardiac fellowship following residency in general surgery, but this route is far less popular). A fellowship in thoracic surgery can be pursued following residency in either cardiac or general surgery.

Unlike the United States and United Kingdom, in Canada there are no national guidelines for residents' call schedules or work hours. However, each province in which residency training takes place negotiates such details as part of a collective agreement between the authority and the provincial professional association of residents. An example of this is the Professional Association of Internes and Residents of Ontario.

== Continuing medical education ==
Both Canadian specialty colleges participate in mandatory continuing medical education (CME) schemes. Examples of CME activities include attendance at conferences, participating in practice-based small group learning, and taking courses such as advanced cardiac life support.

The CFPC program for family physicians is called MAINPRO, short for 'Maintenance of Proficiency.' A certain number of credits must be obtained over 5 year cycles. There are different classes of credits depending on whether the CME activity is considered accredited (e.g., attending accredited workshops or conferences) or non-accredited (e.g., teaching medical students, preparing research papers for publication, reading scholarly journals).

The Office of Professional Affairs of the RCPSC is responsible for a mandatory maintenance of certification (MOC) program as part of its strategy of continuous professional development linked to each Fellow’s professional practice. The framework of CPD options includes a broad spectrum of learning activities linked to a credit system. All Fellows submit their completed learning activities through MAINPORT, the RCPSC learning portfolio. Fellows of the RCPSC must submit a minimum number of credits per year (40 credits) and over a 5-year cycle (400 credits) to maintain their membership with the Royal College and their right to use the designation FRCPC or FRCSC. That instead gives way to more time.

=== Evaluation ===
During the final year of medical school, students complete part 1 of the Medical Council of Canada Qualifying Examination (MCCQE), which is administered by the Medical Council of Canada and organized as a part-multiple choice, part-short answer computer-adaptive test. Upon completion of the final year of medical school, students are awarded the degree of M.D. Students then begin training in the residency program designated to them by CaRMS. Part 2 of the MCCQE, an Objective Structured Clinical Examination, was taken following completion of 12 months of residency training. The MCC ceased delivery of the MCCQE Part 2 in June 2021. Prior to June 2021, both parts of the MCCQE were required to be successfully completed for the resident to become a Licentiate of the Medical Council of Canada (LMCC). Under the updated LMCC criteria, only the MCCQE Part 1 is required. However, in order to practice independently, the resident must complete the residency program and take a board examination pertinent to his or her intended scope of practice. In the final year of residency training, residents take an exam administered by either the RCPSC or the CFPC, depending on whether they are training for specialty or family practice. They are then eligible to apply for full licensure with their provincial or territorial medical regulatory authority (i.e., provincial college).

=== Accreditation ===
Together with the Canadian Medical Association (CMA), the Association of Faculties of Medicine of Canada (AFMC) carries out accreditation surveys and rules on the accreditation status of all of the undergraduate medical programs in Canada, as well as all university-based continuing medical education. The Liaison Committee on Medical Education, jointly administered by the Association of American Medical Colleges and the American Medical Association, also accredits Canadian medical schools. The M.D. and M.D.C.M medical degrees are the only medical degrees offered in Canada listed in the WHO/IMED list of medical schools.

== Language ==
In Canada, physician training is available in both official languages: English and French. Postgraduate trainees are referred to as 'residents'.

== See also ==
- List of medical schools in Canada
