= 2002 Oregon Ballot Measure 27 =

Failed ballot initiative on GMO labeling

Ballot Measure 27 of 2002 would have required the mandatory labelling of all genetically modified food sold in the U.S. state of Oregon. The measure was defeated in the November 5, 2002 general election with 371,851 votes in favor, 886,806 votes against. The measure was placed on the ballot as a result of initiative petition.

Proponents of the measure argued that "Oregonians should have the right to know what they are eating." They repeated the belief of some activists that genetic engineering of food poses a potential threat to health and safety. (See genetically modified food.) Proponents also ridiculed the cost estimates of the law brought by the measure's opponents. Proponents hoped that an Oregon labeling law would spark debate about the use of genetically modified organisms (GMOs) in food and eventually a nationwide labelling system.

Opponents argued that Oregon's agricultural industry would be burdened by excessive costs if the measure were to pass, given the lack of such a requirement throughout the rest of the United States. In addition, opponents claimed there was little evidence that GMO foods posed a danger to human health. Monsanto Company, an agricultural company whose products account for 70% of the GMO market, donated $1.5 million to the effort against the measure. Overall, opponents spent $5.5 million, tying an Oregon spending record.

Results by county: No: 50–60%; 60–70%; 70–80%; 80–90%

== See also ==
- List of Oregon ballot measures
- California Proposition 37 (2012)
