= Consolidated and Further Continuing Appropriations Act, 2013 =

Act of United States Congress

Department of Defense Appropriations Act, 2013
- Long title: Making appropriations for the Department of Defense, the Department of Veterans Affairs, and other departments and agencies for the fiscal year ending September 30, 2013, and for other purposes.
- Announced in: the 113th United States Congress
- Sponsored by: Rep. Harold Rogers (R, KY-5)
- Number of co-sponsors: 0

Codification
- Acts affected: Department of Defense, Military Construction and Veterans Affairs, and Full-Year Continuing Appropriations Act, 2013, Balanced Budget and Emergency Deficit Control Act of 1985, Foreign Operations, Export Financing, and Related Programs Appropriations Act, 1990, Defense Base Closure and Realignment Act of 1990, Social Security Act, and many more
- U.S.C. sections affected: 42 U.S.C. § 402(note), 10 U.S.C. § 10211, 10 U.S.C. § 10302, 10 U.S.C. § 3038, 10 U.S.C. § 12301(d), 10 U.S.C. § 12310(a), 10 U.S.C. § 16131, 10 U.S.C. § 12301(d), 10 U.S.C. § 12310(a), 10 U.S.C. § 16131, and many more
- Appropriations: At least $745,638,825,000.00 with an additional unlimited amount

Legislative history
- Introduced in the House as H.R. 933 by Rep. Hal Rogers (R-KY) on March 4, 2013; Committee consideration by United States House Committee on Appropriations, United States House Committee on the Budget; Passed the House on March 6, 2013 (Roll Call 62: 267-151); Passed the Senate on March 20, 2013 (Vote 44: 73-26) with amendment; House agreed to Senate amendment on March 21, 2013 (Roll Call 89: 318-109); Signed into law by President Barack Obama on March 26, 2013

Consolidated and Further Continuing Appropriations Act, 2013 (Pub. L. 113–6 (text) (PDF), H.R. 933, enacted March 26, 2013) was a bill passed by the United States House of Representatives of the 113th United States Congress. The bill prevented a government shutdown and funded the federal government through September 30, 2013 as it replaced a continuing resolution which expired on March 27, 2013.

It also required the United States Postal Service to continue regular mail delivery on Saturdays.

== Provisions of the act ==
This summary is based largely on the summary provided by the Congressional Research Service, a public domain source.

The Department of Defense, Military Construction and Veterans Affairs, and Full-Year Continuing Appropriations Act, 2013 appropriated funds for FY2013 to the Department of Defense (DOD) for:

(1) military personnel;
(2) operation and maintenance, including for the United States Court of Appeals for the Armed Forces, environmental restoration, overseas humanitarian, disaster, and civic aid, former Soviet Union cooperative threat reduction, and the Department of Defense Acquisition Workforce Development Fund;
(3) procurement, including for aircraft, missiles, weapons, tracked combat vehicles, ammunition, shipbuilding and conversion, and purchases under the Defense Production Act of 1950;
(4) research, development, test, and evaluation (RDT&E);
(5) Defense Working Capital Funds and the National Defense Sealift Fund;
(6) the Defense Health Program;
(7) chemical agents and munitions destruction;
(8) drug interdiction and counter-drug activities;
(9) the Office of the Inspector General;
(10) the Central Intelligence Agency Retirement and Disability System Fund;
(11) the Intelligence Community Management Account; and
(12) overseas contingency operations, including regular, reserve, and National Guard personnel, operation and maintenance, the Overseas Contingency Operations Transfer Fund, the Afghanistan Infrastructure Fund, the Afghanistan Security Forces Fund, procurement, RDT&E, and the Joint Improvised Explosive Device Defeat Fund.

The act specified authorized, restricted, and prohibited uses of the funds that had been appropriated.

The Military Construction and Veterans Affairs, and Related Agencies Appropriations Act, 2013 appropriated funds for FY2013 for the Department of Defense for:

(1) military construction for the Army, Navy and Marine Corps, and Air Force (military departments), DOD, the Army and Air National Guard, and the United States Army Reserve, United States Navy Reserve, and Air Force Reserve;
(2) the North Atlantic Treaty Organization (NATO) Security Investment Program;
(3) family housing construction and related operation and maintenance for the military departments and DOD;
(4) the Department of Defense Family Housing Improvement Fund;
(5) DOD chemical demilitarization construction; and
(6) the Department of Defense Base Closure Accounts of 1990 and 2005.

The act also appropriated funds for the Department of Veterans Affairs (VA) for:

(1) the Veterans Benefits Administration;
(2) readjustment benefits;
(3) veterans insurance and indemnities;
(4) the Veterans Housing Benefit Program Fund;
(5) the Vocational Rehabilitation Loans Program;
(6) the Native American Veteran Housing Loan Program;
(7) the Veterans Health Administration;
(8) the National Cemetery Administration;
(9) the Office of Inspector General;
(10) construction for major and minor projects; and
(11) grants for the construction of extended care facilities and veterans cemeteries.

The act also appropriated funds for:

(1) the American Battle Monuments Commission,
(2) the United States Court of Appeals for Veterans Claims,
(3) DOD cemeterial expenses,
(4) the Armed Forces Retirement Home, and
(5) overseas contingency operations for military construction for the Navy and Marine Corps.

The act included specific restrictions and authorities regarding the use of funds appropriated.

The Full-Year Continuing Appropriations Act, 2013 made continuing appropriations for FY2013 to a variety of other federal agencies and programs. The act appropriated amounts for continuing operations, projects, or activities which were conducted in FY2012 and for which appropriations, funds, or other authority were made available in:

(1) the Agriculture, Rural Development, Food and Drug Administration, and Related Agencies Appropriations Act, 2012;
(2) the Commerce, Justice, Science, and Related Agencies Appropriations Act, 2012;
(3) the Energy and Water Development and Related Agencies Appropriations Act, 2012;
(4) the Financial Services and General Government Appropriations Act, 2012;
(5) the Department of Homeland Security Appropriations Act, 2012;
(6) the Department of the Interior, Environment, and Related Agencies Appropriations Act, 2012;
(7) the Departments of Labor, Health and Human Services, and Education, and Related Agencies Appropriations Act, 2012;
(8) the Legislative Branch Appropriations Act, 2012;
(9) the Department of State, Foreign Operations, and Related Programs Appropriations Act, 2012;
(10) the Transportation, Housing and Urban Development, and Related Agencies Appropriations Act, 2012; and
(11) the Disaster Relief Appropriations Act, 2012.

This act established the levels of funding for FY2013 for departments and agencies included under the list of acts above, and it specifies the authorized, restricted, and prohibited uses of those appropriated funds.

Finally, the act rescinded, except as specified, defined applicable percentages of:

(1) the budget authority provided (or obligation limit imposed) for FY2013 for any of the preceding discretionary accounts,
(2) the budget authority provided in any advance appropriation for FY2013 for any discretionary account in any prior fiscal year appropriation Act, and
(3) the contract authority provided in FY2013 for any program subject to limitation incorporated or otherwise contained in the preceding provisions this Act.

== Procedural history ==
=== First passage in the House ===
H.R. 933 was introduced into the United States House of Representatives on March 4, 2013 by Hal Rogers (R-KY). It was referred to the Appropriations Committee and the Budget Committee. The bill passed the House on March 6, 2013, 267-151.

=== Passage in the Senate ===
H.R. 933 was received in the United States Senate on March 7, 2013. H.R. 933 passed the Senate with an amendment, 73 – 26.

=== Second passage in the House ===
As H.R. 933 had passed in the Senate in amended form, it had to be considered a second time in the House. The House approved it again on March 21, 2013, 318-109.

=== Presidential signature ===
H.R. 933 was then presented to the President of the United States Barack Obama on March 22, 2013. He signed it on March 26, 2013, whereupon it became Public Law 113-6.

== See also ==
- Farmer Assurance Provision

== Notes and references ==
- H.R.933 – Consolidated and Further Continuing Appropriations Act, 2013. Library of Congress. Accessed March 30, 2013.
