= Bukola Salami =

Nigerian-Canadian nursing scholar

Oluwabukola Salami
- Born: Oluwabukola Oladunni Salami; Nigeria
- Citizenship: Canadian
- Education: University of Windsor (BScN); University of Toronto (MN, PhD)
- Known for: Research on Black health, immigrant health, and health policy
- Awards: Member, Royal Society of Canada (2024); Fellow of the American Academy of Nursing (2023); Queen Elizabeth II Platinum Jubilee Medal (Alberta) (2022); Fellow, Canadian Academy of Nursing (2021)
- Scientific career
- Fields: Nursing; Black health; Health policy; Immigrant health
- Workplaces: University of Calgary; University of Alberta

Oluwabukola Oladunni Salami also known as Bukola Salami, is a Nigerian-Canadian nursing scholar. She is a full professor in the Department of Community Health Sciences at the Cumming School of Medicine, University of Calgary, where she holds the Tier 1 Canada Research Chair in Black and Racialized Peoples’ Health. Her research focuses on health equity, immigrant health, Black health, and health policy.

== Early life and education ==
Salami was born in Nigeria and immigrated to Canada with her family in 1997 at the age of 16. She earned a Bachelor of Science in Nursing from the University of Windsor in 2004, followed by a Master of Nursing in 2007 and a PhD in Nursing in 2013 from the University of Toronto.

== Academic career ==
In 2023, Salami joined the Department of Community Health Sciences at the Cumming School of Medicine, University of Calgary, where she was appointed Tier 1 Canada Research Chair in Black and Racialized Peoples’ Health. She is also cross-appointed to the Faculty of Nursing and is a member of the O’Brien Institute for Public Health. She was previously a professor in the Faculty of Nursing at the University of Alberta, where she directed the Intersections of Gender Signature Area and co-led the establishment of the Institute for Intersectionality Studies.

Salami has been principal investigator or co-investigator on more than 90 funded research projects. In 2023, she received a $2.5 million SSHRC Partnership Grant for the project Transforming the Lives of Black Children and Youth in Canada. Her research has been cited in national policy discussions, including testimony before the Canadian House of Commons Standing Committee on Health. Salami serves as co-chair of the Public Health Agency of Canada Advisory Committee on Science.

== Selected awards and honors ==
- University of Windsor Alumni of Distinction Award (2025)
- Member, Royal Society of Canada, College of New Scholars, Artists and Scientists (2024)
- University of Calgary Equity, Diversity & Inclusion Award (2024)
- Inaugural recipient, Health Research Foundation Diversity and Equity in Research Award (2023)
- Fellow of the American Academy of Nursing (2023)
- Queen Elizabeth II Platinum Jubilee Medal (Alberta) (2022)
- Killam Accelerator Research Award, University of Alberta (2021)
- Fellow, Canadian Academy of Nursing (2021)
- International Nurse Researcher Hall of Fame, Sigma Theta Tau (2021)
