= Arran Stephens =

Canadian businessman

Arran Stephens OBC
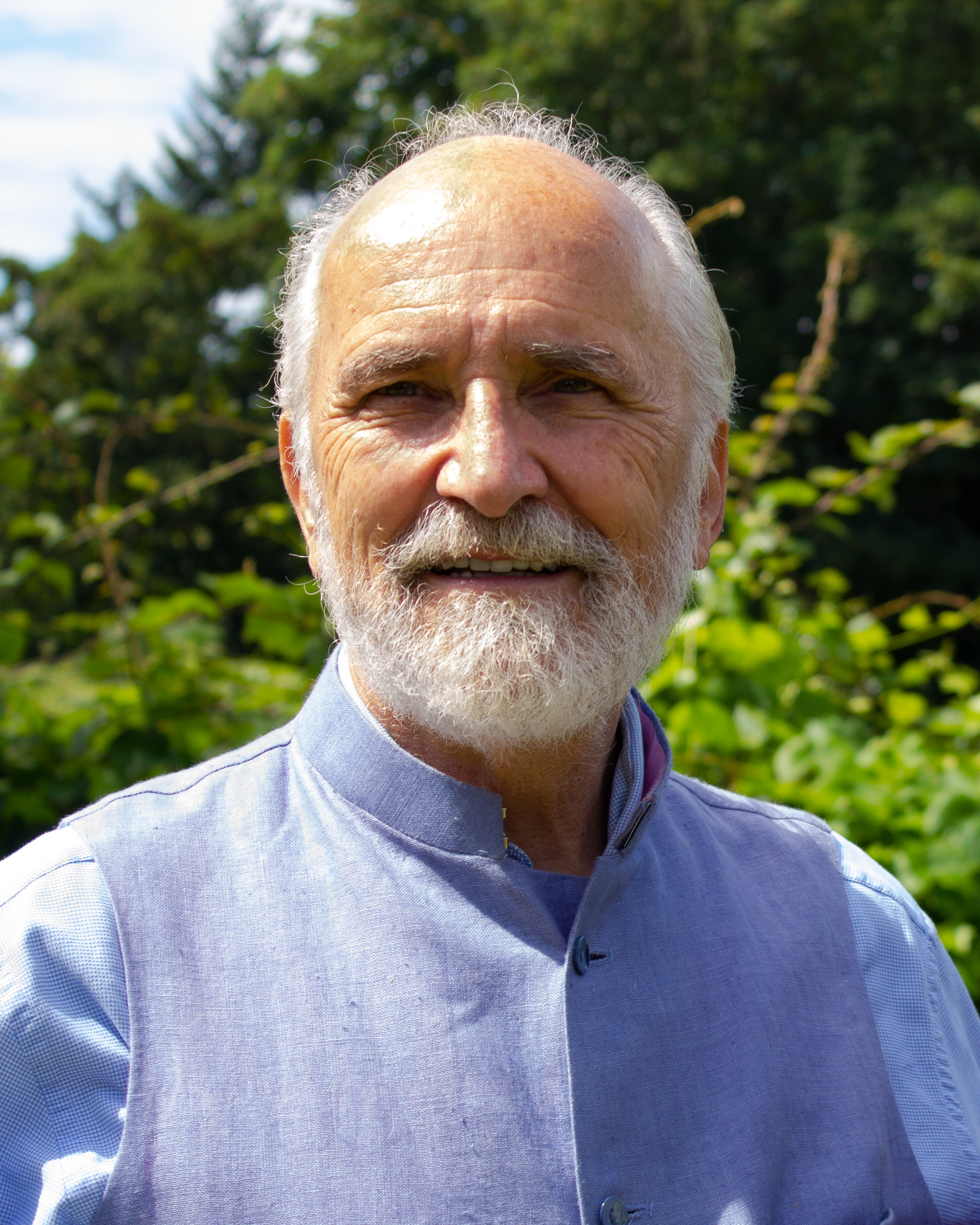
- Arran Stephens (2020)
- Born: 1944 (age 81–82); British Columbia, Canada
- Occupations: CEO and Co-Founder of Nature's Path Organic Foods, Inc., author, painter
- Spouse: Ratana Stephens
- Children: 4
- Website: www.arransart.org

Arran Blackburn Stephens (born 1944) is a Canadian entrepreneur, author, and philanthropist. He is co-founder of Nature's Path, a leading manufacturer of organic foods. He is regarded as a pioneer in the food industry and has received numerous acknowledgments for his work promoting sustainable agriculture, organics, and opposition to genetic food modification.

== Early life ==
Arran Stephens was born on Vancouver Island in British Columbia, the son of Rupert Stephens, a berry farmer and songwriter, and Gwen Stephens. His brother is Godfrey Stephens, a well-known Canadian artist. Stephens is of English and Scottish ancestry. His paternal great-great-grandfather was Joseph Cripps MP (1765–1847), long-serving Member of Parliament for Cirencester. Joseph's grandson, John Matthew Cripps (1823–1892), rose to the rank of Lieutenant-General in the Bengal Staff Corps. Lt-Gen Cripps's daughter Agnes Grace Cripps married Dr Harold Stephens, bringing the family to Vancouver Island, British Columbia.

Stephens grew up on a berry farm on Vancouver Island until his early teens, when his family relocated to Los Angeles following his father's pursuit of a songwriting career. He attended Hollywood High School briefly before supporting himself as a painter and poet, with gallery showings in Los Angeles, San Francisco, New York City, and Vancouver.

In 1964, while living in New York, Stephens became interested in spirituality and mysticism. In 1967 he travelled to India to study for seven months under Sant Kirpal Singh. He returned to India in 1968 for a further six months of study, and on 4 March 1969 married Ratana Mala Bagga, a college lecturer, before returning with her to Canada.

== Beginning of Nature's Path ==
On returning to Vancouver from India in 1967, and inspired by the Buddhist concept of right livelihood, Stephens borrowed CAD $1,500 and opened The Golden Lotus in August 1967 on the corner of West 4th Avenue and Bayswater in Kitsilano — Canada's first vegetarian restaurant. The restaurant found its footing in part thanks to a favourable review in the Georgia Straight and the influx of American draft dodgers crossing into Vancouver. Banyen Books & Sound later grew out of a reading corner within the Golden Lotus, and a former cook went on to found The Naam café nearby. In 1969, Stephens sold the restaurant to a staff cooperative for CAD $2,500 and returned to India.

In 1971, the Stephenses co-founded LifeStream Natural Foods, Canada's first natural food market, selling it to Kraft Foods in 1981 and opening Woodlands Natural Food Restaurant in Kitsilano that same year. Nature's Path was launched from the back of Woodlands in 1985. By 1990, they had opened North America's first certified organic breakfast cereal production facility in Delta, British Columbia. Originally focusing on cereals and breads, the company now sells a variety of products including toaster pastries, waffles, and granola, distributing to over 50 countries worldwide. The product line has remained 100% certified organic since its founding and the company remains family-run and privately owned. In 2012, Nature's Path acquired Que Pasa Mexican Foods. Two of the Stephenses' four children, Arjan and Jyoti, are active in leadership within the company.

== Industry leadership and advocacy ==
Stephens has been a leading figure in North American organic trade associations since their earliest years. From 1971 to 1975, he served on the board of Organic Merchants, the first organic trade association in North America and a predecessor to OFPANA and the Organic Trade Association (OTA). He subsequently served on the OTA board of directors from 1996 to 2002, a period that encompassed the creation and launch of the USDA National Organic Program. He resigned from the OTA board in 2002, citing the organization's refusal to take a formal position against genetically modified organisms. In 2018, Nature's Path resigned its OTA membership entirely, with Stephens describing the decision as a protest against the OTA's backing of a federal GMO labelling law that pre-empted stronger state legislation, and its acceptance of hydroponics under the organic certification label.

Stephens was an early supporter and founding board member of the Non-GMO Project. He was also a vocal supporter of California's Proposition 37, the 2012 ballot initiative that would have mandated GMO labelling on food sold in California.

Stephens has served on the boards of The Rodale Institute, the Canadian Health Food Association, UBC's Faculty of Land and Food Systems, and the Kwantlen Polytechnic University Food Advisory Board, as well as serving as chairman of the Richmond Food Security Society. Since 1974, Stephens has served on the board of Science of Spirituality of Canada, a federally incorporated charity. He received no compensation for his service on these non-profit boards.

== Later life ==
=== Health ===
In March 2011, Stephens received a living-donor liver transplant at Vancouver General Hospital for non-alcoholic end-stage cirrhosis. The donated liver tissue was provided by his daughter Gurdeep. Following his recovery, Arran and Ratana Stephens donated $1 million to VGH's Gastroenterology Department in gratitude for his care. A portion of the gift funded the purchase of a Fibroscan System — a non-invasive ultrasound technology for diagnosing liver disease — and an Endoscopic Ultrasound for the hospital's Endoscopy Clinic.

=== Painting and visual art ===
Before founding Nature's Path, Stephens had an early career as a painter. At nineteen, he was showing work simultaneously on both coasts: the Los Angeles Times listed his paintings at the Fourth Street Gallery, Santa Monica in March 1963, while Oakland Tribune art critic Miriam Dungan Cross singled him out at the Batman Gallery, 222 Fillmore Street, San Francisco as a potential discovery, describing his paintings and constructions as depicting "the world of the occult with freshness, clarity, beauty and candor." His exhibition catalogue that year included a handwritten personal credo. By 1965 he was being covered in the Vancouver Sun. He set aside painting in 1967 to pursue the path that would become Nature's Path, and did not return to the canvas for nearly fifty years.

He returned to painting in 2016. In June 2022, he held his first public exhibition in 56 years — A Luminous Journey: The Art of Arran Stephens, O.B.C. — at the Hatch Art Gallery, University of British Columbia, raising nearly CAD $70,000 for Doctors Without Borders Canada in response to the war in Ukraine. The featured work, Madonna of Sunflowers (2022, oil on canvas), was proposed by Stephens as the subject of a commemorative Canada Post stamp for Ukraine relief and was acquired by Vancouver collector Bob Rennie of the Rennie Collection. In May 2025, he unveiled Conference of the Birds at Simon Fraser University's Fei and Milton Wong Experimental Theatre — a large-format oil drawn from the 12th-century Persian poem by Farid ud-Din Attar — with the Kereshmeh Ensemble performing alongside.

=== Authorship ===
Stephens has authored or co-authored four books spanning spirituality, diet, and memoir.

Journey to the Luminous: Encounters with Mystic Adepts of Our Century (Elton-Wolf Publishing, 1999) chronicles his personal encounters with spiritual teachers, centred on his years of study and meditation under Sant Kirpal Singh Ji Maharaj.

The Compassionate Diet: How What You Eat Can Change Your Life and Save the Planet (Rodale Books, 2011), co-authored with Eliot Jay Rosen, argues for a plant-centred diet on grounds of personal health, animal welfare, and environmental sustainability, with endorsements from John Robbins and John Mackey of Whole Foods Market.

Moth & the Flame: Adventures with Three Mystic Adepts of Our Times (Skyline Publications, 2024) traces his journey from British Columbia through the counterculture of 1960s New York — including encounters with Allen Ginsberg and Eden Ahbez — to his initiation under Sant Kirpal Singh. Kirpal: Mere Guru, Mere Malik (Skyline Publications, 2024) is a companion volume on that same relationship.

== Recognition ==
=== Government honours and honorary degrees ===
In 2021, Arran and Ratana received the Order of British Columbia, the province's highest civilian honour. The investiture ceremony was delayed to March 2022 due to COVID-19.

In November 2021, the University of Victoria conferred honorary doctorate degrees in Education upon Ratana and Arran.

In June 2024, the University of British Columbia conferred honorary doctorate degrees in Science upon Arran and Ratana.

=== Industry awards ===
- 1997: Canadian Health Food Association Lifetime Achievement Award
- 2002: Ernst & Young Manufacturing & Distribution Award
- 2002: CHFA Organics Achievement Award
- 2013: Leadership Award for Character, Vision, and Impact, Leadership Institute, New York
- 2013: New Hope Hall of Legends Award, New Hope Network
- 2013: Growing the Organic Industry Award, Organic Trade Association (with Ratana Stephens)
- 2013: OTA Organic Leadership Award
- 2014: Stewardship Award, Food in Canada magazine (with Ratana Stephens)
- 2017: Leader in Sustainability, Rabobank North America Leadership Awards (with Ratana Stephens)
- 2018: Organic Pioneer Award, Rodale Institute
- 2021: Canada Marketing Legends Award, American Marketing Association (with Ratana Stephens)
- 2021: Sustainable Food Award, Ecovia Intelligence (with Ratana Stephens)
- 2021: Lifetime Achievement Award, 7th Annual Drishti Awards (with Ratana Stephens)
- 2022: Grocery Hall of Fame, Grocery Business magazine (with Ratana Stephens)
- 2022: Distinguished Entrepreneurs of the Year, Peter B. Gustavson School of Business, University of Victoria (with Ratana Stephens)
- 2024: Rix Award for Engaged Community Citizenship, Greater Vancouver Board of Trade (with Ratana Stephens)
- 2024: President's Distinguished Community Leadership Award, Simon Fraser University (with Ratana Stephens)

== Philanthropy ==
In June 2026, Arran and Ratana Stephens made a $40 million donation to Simon Fraser University's new school of medicine — the largest single donation in SFU's history and one of the largest ever made to a medical school in Canada. In recognition, the school was named the SFU Stephens Family School of Medicine, welcoming its first cohort of 48 students in August 2026. The BC government noted that the Stephens family has donated more than $100 million throughout the Lower Mainland and globally.

Their other major philanthropic contributions include:

Vancouver General Hospital — The Stephens family made two major gifts to VGH's Gastroenterology Department: an initial donation funding the purchase of a Fibroscan System, a non-invasive ultrasound tool for painless liver disease diagnosis, followed by a $1 million gift establishing the Stephens Family Fellowship in Gastroenterology, a 10-year program supporting future Canadian leaders in clinical care and research.

Vancouver Coastal Health Withdrawal Management Centre — A $3 million donation towards a new, purpose-built withdrawal management facility in East Vancouver, intended to bring addiction treatment resources currently distributed across the city under one roof, scheduled for completion in 2027.

Food banks — Through Nature's Path's Bite4Bite Love Crunch program, the company donates at least $2 million worth of food annually to food banks across North America, with total donations exceeding CAD $41 million between 2010 and 2023.

Gardens for Good — A Nature's Path initiative founded in 2010 that awards annual grants to organic community gardens across the United States and Canada. Since its launch, the program has donated nearly $1 million to more than 120 gardens, reaching its goal of $1 million donated three years ahead of schedule in 2025.

Health care and education — Further contributions have been made to BC Children's Hospital, St. Paul's Hospital Wellness Garden, the University of British Columbia Faculty of Land and Food Systems, the University of Victoria (student bursaries), Kwantlen Polytechnic University, and the Science of Spirituality Meditation Centre.

Doctors Without Borders Canada — Proceeds from Arran Stephens's 2022 art exhibition at UBC, which raised nearly CAD $70,000 in support of Ukraine relief.
