= List of medical schools in Canada =

This list of medical schools in Canada includes major academic institutions that award the Doctor of Medicine (M.D.) degree, which is required to become a physician or a surgeon in Canada. M.D. granting medical schools are jointly accredited by the Committee on Accreditation of Canadian Medical Schools (CACMS) and the U.S. Liaison Committee on Medical Education. There are 19 medical schools in Canada; 17 with full accreditation and two with preliminary accreditation.

== List of medical schools ==
Province	School	City	Degree	Established	Year Instruction Began	First class	Class size	Notes
Alberta	University of Alberta Faculty of Medicine and Dentistry	Edmonton	MD	1913	1913	1917	192	
Alberta	University of Calgary Cumming School of Medicine	Calgary, Lethbridge	MD	1967	1970	1973	210	The University of Calgary and the University of Lethbridge have partnered to create the Southern Alberta Medical Program. It welcomes its first cohort in July 2026 and has 30 seats.
British Columbia	University of British Columbia Faculty of Medicine	Vancouver, Victoria, Prince George, Kelowna	MD	1950	1950	1954	328	Along with Vancouver-Fraser Medical Program (VFMP at UBC), distributed medical education sites are partnered with University of Victoria (Island Medical Program) in Victoria, University of Northern BC (Northern Medical Program) in Prince George, and UBC Okanagan (Southern Medical Program) in Kelowna.
British Columbia	SFU Stephens Family School of Medicine	Surrey	MD	2024	2026	2030	48	
Manitoba	University of Manitoba Max Rady College of Medicine	Winnipeg	MD	1883	1883	1887	140	
Newfoundland and Labrador	Memorial University of Newfoundland Faculty of Medicine	St.John's, Charlottetown	MD	1967	1969	1973	80	The Charlottetown Campus is run in conjunction with the University of Prince Edward Island's Faculty of Medicine. It has opened in August 2025. The UPEI site will operate as a regional campus of Memorial University until a future medical school and joint degree is eventually established at UPEI.
Nova Scotia	Dalhousie University Faculty of Medicine	Halifax, Saint John, Cape Breton	MD	1868	1868	1872	169	1875 Halifax Medical College, 1911 Dalhousie University Faculty of Medicine. In 2010, Dalhousie University established a medical campus at the University of New Brunswick Saint John Campus. In 2025, Dalhousie University established another medical campus at Cape Breton University. The Cape Breton Campus is expected to be its own independent medical school run by Cape Breton University by 2035.
Ontario	McMaster University Michael G. DeGroote School of Medicine	Hamilton, Waterloo, St. Catharines	MD	1965	1969	1972	220	
Ontario	NOSM University	Sudbury, Thunder Bay	MD	2005	2005	2009	88	Formerly a joint faculty of Laurentian University and Lakehead University. Since 2022 an independent university.
Ontario	Queen's University School of Medicine	Kingston	MD	1854	1854	1858	138	1866 separated from Queen's University to become Royal College of Physicians and Surgeons at Kingston, 1892 rejoined Queen's University
Ontario	Western University Schulich School of Medicine and Dentistry	London, Windsor	MD	1881	1882	1886	171	
Ontario	University of Ottawa Faculty of Medicine	Ottawa	MD	1945	1945	1949	164 (116 English Stream, 48 French Stream)	
Ontario	University of Toronto Temerty Faculty of Medicine	Toronto, Mississauga	MD	1843	1843	1847	303	1843 Medical Faculty of King's College, 1847 became University of Toronto Faculty of Medicine, 1853-1887 abolished, 1887 reestablished by take over of Toronto School of Medicine, 1902 absorbed Victoria University Medical Department, 1903 absorbed Trinity Medical College
Ontario	Toronto Metropolitan University School of Medicine	Brampton	MD	2025	2025	2029	94	Preliminarily accredited with a plan for initial class of 94 MD students in 2025.
Québec	Université Laval Faculté de Médecine	Québec City	MD	1848	1854	1858	201	1848 Québec School of Medicine, 1852 Medical Department of Laval University
Québec	McGill University Faculty of Medicine	Montréal, Gatineau	MDCM	1823	1829	1833	185	1824 Montréal Medical Institution, 1829 Medical Faculty of McGill University, 1836-1839 no sessions, 1905 absorbed Faculty of Medicine of the University of Bishop College
Québec	Université de Montréal Faculté de Médecine	Montréal, Trois-Rivières	MD	1843	1843	1847	281	1843 Montréal School of Medicine and Surgery, 1891 absorbed Laval University Medical Faculty at Montréal Since 2004, the University of Montreal Faculty of Medicine has operated a satellite campus of its medical school at Université du Québec à Trois-Rivières.
Québec	Université de Sherbrooke Faculté de Médecine et des Sciences de la Santé	Sherbrooke, Chicoutimi, Moncton	MD	1966	1966	1970	195	Established the Centre de Formation Médicale du Nouveau-Brunswick on the campus of Université de Moncton in 2006. and the Programme de Formation Médicale à Saguenay, affiliated with the Université du Québec à Chicoutimi
Saskatchewan	University of Saskatchewan College of Medicine	Saskatoon, Regina	MD	1926	1953	1957	128	

== Former medical schools ==
Province	School	City	Degree	Established	First class	Closed	Notes
Ontario	Kingston Woman's Medical College	Kingston	MD	1883		1894	Degrees granted by affiliated Queen's University
Ontario	Ontario Medical College for Women	Toronto	MD	1884		1906	Affiliated with University of Toronto, not empowered to grant degrees
Ontario	Toronto School of Medicine	Toronto	MD	1847		1887	1854 affiliated with University of Toronto and Victoria University, 1887 absorbed by University of Toronto
Ontario	Trinity Medical College	Toronto	MD	1853		1903	1853 Upper Canada School of Medicine, 1854 suspended, 1870 reorganized as Faculty of Medicine of Trinity College, 1877 became independent Trinity Medical College, 1878 affiliated with Trinity University and University of Toronto, 1902 reconstituted as Medical Faculty of Trinity University, 1903 merged with Faculty of Medicine of the University of Toronto
Ontario	Victoria University Medical Department	Toronto	MD	1853/54		1869	In the 1850s Victoria College was in Cobourg (Ontario) and the Department of Medicine was established in 1854 when John Rolph’s medical school in Toronto became attached to the College. In 1866, L'École de médecine et de chirurgie de Montréal also became affiliated with Victoria College. No classes were actually given in Cobourg, however the medical diplomas were issued by Victoria College/University because neither medical school was empowered to grant degrees on their own. The Department’s Medical Board of Examiners was established in 1875 to examine students with certificates from medical schools who wished to obtain M.D. degrees. Dr. Uzziel Ogden taught on the Toronto Faculty for many years. The name of the Department was changed when Victoria University was constituted in 1884, and the Department ceased to exist when Victoria University became affiliated with the University of Toronto.
Québec	Laval University Medical Faculty	Montréal	MD	1878	1879	1891	1891 absorbed by the Montréal School of Medicine and Surgery
Québec	St. Lawrence School of Medicine	St. Lawrence	MDCM	1851	1851	1852	
Québec	University of Bishop College Faculty of Medicine	Montréal	MDCM	1870	1871	1905	1905 absorbed by McGill University Faculty of Medicine

== Proposed medical schools ==
Province	School	City	Degree	Proposed start year	Notes
Ontario	York University	Vaughan	MD	2028	In planning stages, Government approved for 80 undergraduate seats and 102 postgraduate seats.
Québec	Université du Québec	10 locations	MD	2031	In study stage. 200 students.

== See also ==
- Medical school in Canada
- List of medical schools
