= Nature's Path =

Canadian organic food company

Nature's Path Foods, Inc.
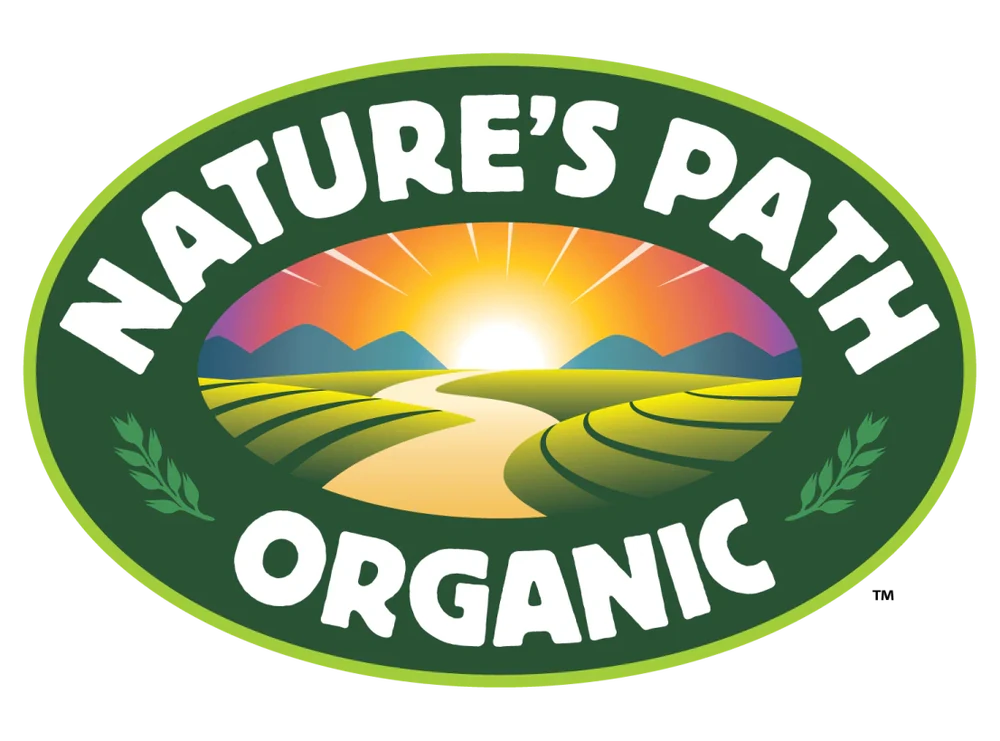
- Logo used since 2026

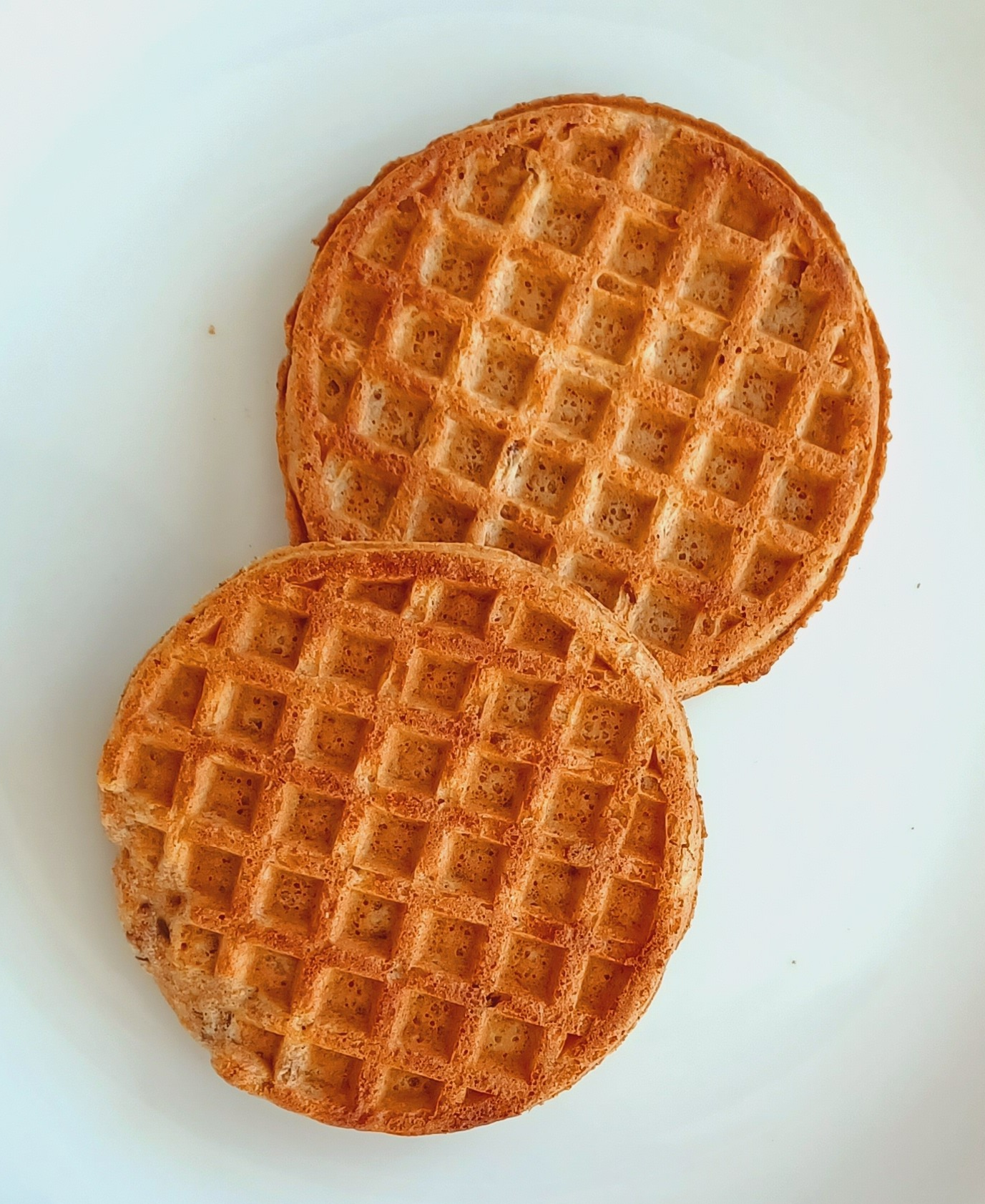
- Nature's Path vegan toaster waffles
- Company type: Private
- Industry: Organic food
- Founded: 1985; 41 years ago
- Founder: Arran Stephens; Ratana Stephens
- Headquarters: Richmond, British Columbia, Canada
- Area served: 42 countries worldwide
- Key people: Arjan Stephens, President; Jyoti Stephens, Vice-President; Arran Stephens, Co-Founder and Board Member; Ratana Stephens, Co-Founder and Board Member
- Products: Breakfast cereal; granola, oatmeal, tortilla chips, toaster pastries, waffles
- Number of employees: 700
- Divisions: EnviroKidz, Love Crunch, Que Pasa, Qi'a
- Subsidiaries: Anita's Organic Flour
- Website: naturespath.com

Nature's Path Foods, commonly known as Nature's Path, is a Canadian, privately-held, family-owned producer of certified organic foods. Originally known for its breakfast cereals, it now has a portfolio of more than 150 products. Founded in 1985 by Arran and Ratana Stephens, Nature's Path employs approximately 500 people, with manufacturing facilities in Canada and the United States and sales in more than 40 countries. All of its products are vegetarian, certified organic, and Non-GMO Project Verified. Nature's Path is a triple bottom line social enterprise and is recognized for incorporating the notion of sustainability into its business practices through its support of various charitable and eco-friendly initiatives. The company is regularly named one of Canada's best employers.

== History ==
The company was founded in 1985 by Arran Stephens and Ratana Stephens in British Columbia, Canada, and its first product was Manna Bread. Previously, in 1971, Stephens founded Lifestream, Canada's first large organic supermarket which sold a successful line of natural products. Lifestream was sold to Kraft in 1981, but in 1995 was repurchased by Stephens. In September 2018, Nature's Path announced plans to move its head office from Richmond to East Vancouver. The Stephens' son, Arjan, became President of Nature's Path in 2023.

== Organic farming ==
The company has purchased 2,880 acres (1,170 ha) of organic farmland in Saskatchewan that it crop shares with family farmers (Fox Valley, Legend Farms, Tompkins Landing Heritage Organic Farms) as well as 2,760 acres (1,120 ha) in Montana (at Wild Horse, Vilicus Farms – including partnership and apprenticeship program) for a total of 5,640 acres (2,280 ha) of organic farmland. Nature's Path serves as an outlet/processor for many independent organic family farmers representing approximately 100,000 organic acres (40,000 ha).

== Non-GMO support ==
Since 2001, Nature's Path has been a staunch opponent of GMO proliferation, and founder Arran Stephens was an early supporter and board member of the Non-GMO Project. Nature's Path products are tested to bear the Non-GMO Project Verified Seal. In 2013, the brand sponsored the making of the documentary GMO OMG. In March 2011, the company was active in supporting the failed Proposition 37, previously the California Right to Know ballot initiative, for mandatory GMO labeling in California and contributed $600,000, as well as supporting the Oregon and Colorado Right to Know campaigns in 2014.

== Products ==
The company's organic products are sold under the Nature's Path, Love Crunch, Que Pasa, Anita's, Qi’a, Flax Plus, and EnviroKidz brand names in grocery and specialty foods stores in more than 42 countries worldwide.

All Nature's Path products are certified organic and vegetarian. Many are vegan, and a large number are gluten-free.
