= Sarah Strasser =

Physician; medical educator

Academic work
- Institutions: University of Waikato, Simon Fraser University

Sarah Elizabeth Strasser AM is a general practitioner and academic, and is a professor emerita at the University of Waikato, and Dean of the medical school. She specialises in rural health, training of the rural medical workforce, and accreditation.

== Academic career ==
Strasser describes herself as a third-generation rural GP. She began training as a GP in the UK, where she met her future husband Roger Strasser, an Australian doctor training in anaesthesia and surgery. Roger was offered a position in London, Ontario, so Strasser completed her training there at the University of Western Ontario, under Ian McWhinney. They returned to Australia together, joined a rural group general practice and academically were associaed with Monash University.

In 2002, both Strassers and their five children relocated to Canada again to set up the Northern Ontario School of Medicine. After five years Sarah Strasser was appointed back in Australia at Flinders University, to develop rural medical training for the Northern Territory, first as Director of the Rural Clinical School and then as Associate Dean Flinders Northern Territory. Strasser then moved to the University of Queensland, where she is head of the rural clinical school and an honorary professor.

In 2020 the Strassers were appointed to the University of Waikato, in the hopes that the government could be persuaded to set up a third New Zealand medical school. After a couple of years both Strassers moved to Simon Fraser University as interim vice-deans, to set up a new medical school.

== Honours and awards ==
In 2019, Strasser was appointed a Member of the Order of Australia. She was appointed professor emeritus at the University of Waikato in 2022, and is an honorary professor at the University of Queensland.

== Selected works ==
- Paul Worley; Couper, Ian; Strasser, Roger Peter; Lisa Graves; Beth-Ann Cummings; Woodman, Richard; Pamela Stagg; David Hirsh; Consortium of Longitudinal Integrated Clerkships (CLIC) Research Collaborative (2016). "A typology of longitudinal integrated clerkships". Medical Education. 50 (9): 922–932. doi:10.1111/medu.13084. PMID 27562892. Wikidata Q38827676.
- Strasser, Roger Peter; Paul Worley; Fortunato Cristobal; Marsh, David; Sue Berry; Strasser, Sarah; Rachel Ellaway (2015). "Putting communities in the driver's seat: the realities of community-engaged medical education". Academic Medicine. 90 (11): 1466–1470. doi:10.1097/acm.0000000000000765. PMID 26017354. Wikidata Q49051078.
- Sibille Merz; Philipp Jaehn; Emily Mena; Kathleen Pöge; Strasser, Sarah; Anke-Christine Saß; Alexander Rommel; Gabriele Bolte; Holmberg, Christine (2021). "Intersectionality and eco-social theory: a review of potentials for public health knowledge and social justice". Critical Public Health. 33 (2): 125–134. doi:10.1080/09581596.2021.1951668. Wikidata Q125212177.
- William Heddle; Gayle Roberton; Sarah Mahoney; Lucie Walters; Strasser, Sarah; Paul Worley (2014). "Challenges in transformation of the "traditional block rotation" medical student clinical education into a longitudinal integrated clerkship model". Education for Health. 27 (2): 138–142. doi:10.4103/1357-6283.143744. PMID 25420974. Wikidata Q50610034.
- Morgan S; Smedts A; Campbell N; Sager R; Lowe M; Strasser, Sarah (2009). "From the bush to the big smoke--development of a hybrid urban community based medical education program in the Northern Territory, Australia". Rural and Remote Health. 9 (3): 1175. PMID 19751095. Wikidata Q37596408.
- Strasser, Sarah; Roger P Strasser (2007). "The Northern Ontario School of Medicine: a long-term strategy to enhance the rural medical workforce". Cahiers de sociologie et de demographie medicales. 47 (4): 469–489. PMID 18251460. Wikidata Q44872914.
- Kathleen Pöge; Strasser, Sarah; Anke-Christine Saß; Alexander Rommel (2020). "Civil society stakeholders' participation in national health reporting on sex/gender issues: a study protocol for an intersectionality-informed and sex/gender-sensitive approach to focus group research". BMJ Open. 10 (1) e033412. doi:10.1136/bmjopen-2019-033412. PMC 7045200. PMID 31937654. Wikidata Q92642104.
