= Ratana Stephens =

Canadian entrepreneur and philanthropist

Ratana Stephens OBC
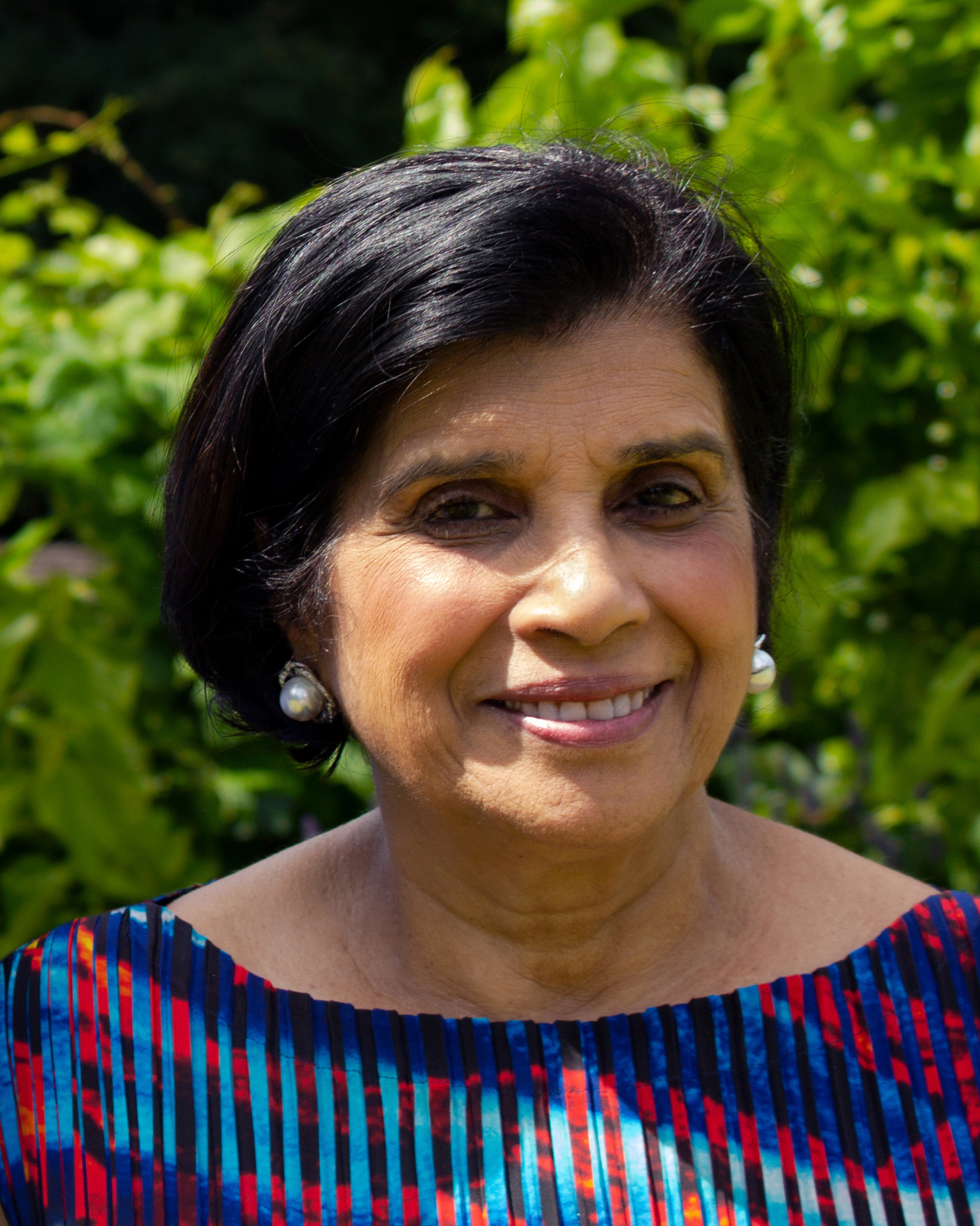
- Ratana Stephens (2020)
- Born: 1946 (age 79–80); Lahore, India (pre-partition)
- Occupations: Ex-CEO, Board Member and Co-Founder of Nature's Path Organic Foods, Inc.
- Spouse: Arran Stephens
- Children: 4

Ratana Stephens (born August 16, 1946) is a Canadian entrepreneur and philanthropist. She is co-founder of Nature's Path, a leading manufacturer of organic foods. She has received numerous acknowledgements for her philanthropy and leadership in business.

== Biography ==
Ratana Stephens (born Ratan Mala Bagga) was born in pre-partition India, where her family operated a confectionary business. The family fled Lahore during the 1947 partition, settling in the Uttar Pradesh region. She earned a Master of Arts degree in English Literature at a college affiliated with Agra University. After completing her degree, Ratana worked as a college lecturer. In March 1969, she met her future husband, Arran Stephens, through an arranged marriage.

== Career ==
Upon arriving in Vancouver, British Columbia, Canada, the Stephens' operated Golden Lotus Natural Foods, a restaurant Arran had opened in 1967, and now regarded as the first vegetarian restaurant in Canada. The Stephens' would go on to open several more successful vegetarian restaurants and a popular health food store.

In 1990, Arran opened Nature's Path, North America's first certified organic breakfast cereal production facility in Delta, British Columbia, while Ratana ran their popular Woodlands restaurant. In 1992 Ratana joined Arran at Nature's Path, eventually taking the position of co-CEO. Two of Ratana's four children, Jyoti and Arjan, hold positions of leadership at Nature's Path. Nature's Path has grown to become the largest exclusively organic breakfast food manufacturer in North America.

Stephens has served on the Boards of Directors of several prominent Canadian institutions, including the United Way, the BC Children's Hospital, and the Royal BC Museum. From 2009 to 2014, Ratana served on the Advisory Council for BC Children's Hospital Foundation's Night of Miracles South Asian Gala. Since 2018, she has served on the Faculty Advisory Board for the Food and Land Systems for University of British Columbia.

== Awards ==
In 2009, Ratana was recognized with the YWCA Women of Distinction Award for Entrepreneurship and Innovation.

In 2012, The Rodale Institute announced the establishment of the Ratana and Arran Stephens Scholarship Fund, awarding scholarships to war veterans who are students of organic agriculture, made possible through a donation from Nature's Path.

In 2013, Ratana was named one of Canada's Top 100 Most Powerful Women by the Women's Executive Network at their eleventh annual awards event.

In 2013, Ratana and Arran Stephens won the Growing the Organic Industry Award from the Organic Trade Association.

In April 2014, Ratana and Arran won the Stewardship Award for their leadership in the food industry from the Food in Canada magazine.

In 2015, Ratana was voted one of Canada's Top 10 Female Entrepreneurs.

In 2015, Ratana was named one of B.C.'s 50 Most Influential Women.

In April 2017, Ratana was named by the Vancouver Sun as one of 150 Noteworthy British Columbians.

In November 2017, Ratana and Arran Stephens won the Leader in Sustainability award given by the Rabobank North America Leadership Awards.

In 2020, Ratana was recognized as an Influential Woman in Business by Business in Vancouver.

In November 2021, the University of Victoria (UVIC) conferred honorary doctorate degrees in Education upon Ratana and Arran.

In 2021, Ratana and Arran received the Order of British Columbia. They were recognized as individuals who have made significant contributions to B.C. The investiture ceremony was delayed to March 2022, due to safety considerations for COVID-19.

The Stephens received the Canada Marketing Legends Award in 2021 from the American Marketing Association.

Ratana and Arran won the Sustainable Food Award from Ecovia Intelligence in 2021 for their contributions to building a sustainable food industry. The 2021 awards were hosted online due to the pandemic.

In 2021, Ratana and Arran received the Lifetime Achievement Award in the 7th Annual Drishti Awards for their outstanding efforts to contribute to a civil society.

In August 2022, Ratana and Arran were inducted into the Grocery Hall of Fame by Grocery Business magazine.

In October 2022, Ratana and Arran received the Peter B. Gustavson School of Business 2022 Distinguished Entrepreneurs of the Year Award (DEYA) from the University of Victoria.

In April 2024, Ratana received the 2023 Canada's Most Admired CEO award, Mid-Market, by Waterstone Human Capital.

In April 2024, Ratana and Arran received the Rix Award for Engaged Community Citizenship from the Greater Vancouver Board of Trade.

In June 2024, the University of British Columbia conferred honorary doctorate degrees in Science upon Ratana and Arran.

In September 2024, Ratana and Arran received the President's Distinguished Community Leadership Award from Simon Fraser University for their work in improving the health of both people and the planet.

== Philanthropy ==
Ratana and Arran Stephens, and their family company have been involved in many philanthropic efforts over the years, primarily to the following:

- Food Banks across North America (over CAD $41,000,000 in food between 2010 and 2023) serving those in need
- Gardens for Good, an initiative of Nature's Path (establishing organic food gardens in underprivileged neighborhoods, community centers and schools)
- Vancouver General Hospital ($2,000,000 to the Gastroenterology Department)
- Vancouver Coastal Health Withdrawal Management Centre
- British Columbia Children's Hospital, where Ratana served on the Board of Directors from 2018 to 2024.
- St. Paul's Hospital Wellness Garden
- Royal British Columbia Museum, where Ratana has served on the Board of Directors since 2018.
- United Way, where Ratana served on the board of directors.
- University of British Columbia (UBC Farm / Land & Food Systems)
- University of Victoria (bursaries for students)
- Kwantlen Polytechnic University
- Simon Fraser University
- Science of Spirituality Meditation Centre
