= Canadian Resident Matching Service =

Canadian medical residency matching service

Canadian Resident Matching Service (CaRMS)
- Headquarters: Ottawa, Ontario
- Website: http://carms.ca

The Canadian Resident Matching Service, abbreviated and most often referred to as CaRMS, is a national organization that operates the mandatory matching service for medical residency training throughout Canada.

== Residency matching ==
CaRMS operates a centralized mandatory residency matching platform. Once the application process is complete, CaRMS runs an algorithm to match applicants with programs in Canada through four residency matches:

- R-1 Main Residency Match
- Family Medicine/Emergency Medicine Match
- Medicine Subspecialty Match
- Pediatric Subspecialty Match

CaRMS also administers Canadian access to the United States' electronic application system for medical residency training, known as the Electronic Residency Application Service (ERAS) and has begun providing admissions services for undergraduate medical school.

=== R-1 Main Residency Match (R-1 match) ===
The match for entry level (R-1) postgraduate positions is CaRMS' largest match. It encompasses all 17 Canadian medical schools and is offered in two iterations each year. The first iteration includes all graduating students and prior year graduates from Canada and the US who meet the basic eligibility criteria and have no prior postgraduate training in Canada or the US. It is also open to graduates from international medical schools (IMGs) who meet the basic criteria and have no prior postgraduate training in Canada or the US. Some of the positions are exclusive to IMGs who meet the basic criteria, with Canadian graduates being excluded from applying to these positions.

The second iteration includes positions left over from the first iteration, which are often in less desirable locations, programs and fields. Applicants not matched in the first iteration will apply to these positions, as well as foreign medical graduates who did not match to the positions exclusively offered to them in the first iteration, as well as any US or Canadian physician with prior post-graduate training obtained in either the first-or-second iterations of their respective matches.

=== Family Medicine/Emergency Medicine (FM/EM) match ===
The Family Medicine/Emergency Medicine match is for applicants who are completing or have completed postgraduate training in family medicine in Canada and want to pursue further emergency medicine training.

=== Medicine Subspecialty Match (MSM) ===
The Medicine Subspecialty Match is for residents currently in an internal medicine residency training program who are looking to apply for subspecialty training.

=== Pediatric Subspecialty Match (PSM) ===
The Pediatric Subspecialty Match is for residents currently in a pediatric residency training program who are looking to apply for subspecialty training.

=== US Match (ERAS) ===
The application process for residency positions in the US is administered by CaRMS' American counterpart, the Electronic Residency Application Service (ERAS). The main residency match itself is managed by the National Residency Matching Program (NRMP). CaRMS acts as the Dean's Office for Canadian medical students and graduates (i.e. students studying in Canada and graduates of Canadian medical schools) applying to positions through ERAS in the United States. This means that to participate in the US match, Canadian applicants must register with CaRMS.

== The Match Algorithm ==
CaRMS uses the Roth-Peranson algorithm to match students into postgraduate medical training programs throughout Canada.
