= Farmer Assurance Provision =

The Farmer Assurance Provision refers to Section 735 (formerly Section 733) of US H.R. 933, a bill that was passed by the Senate on March 20, 2013, and then signed into law as part of the Consolidated and Further Continuing Appropriations Act, 2013 by President Barack Obama on March 26, 2013. The provisions of this law remained in effect for six months, until the end of the fiscal year on September 30, 2013. The Farmer Assurance Provision was discontinued in Sec. 101 of the Continuing Appropriations Act, 2014. The bill is commonly referred to as the "Monsanto Protection Act" by its critics.

== History ==
The Farmer Assurance Provision was originally included as Section 733 in the June 2012 initial draft of the FY2013 Agriculture Appropriations bill in the House of Representatives. With respect to the text of the provision, the online news website Politico reported that Senator Roy Blunt (R-MO) "said he worked with the company (Monsanto) and had a valuable partner in the late chairman, Inouye, who was sympathetic given Monsanto’s large seed operations in Hawaii."

Politico further reported that "a House–Senate compromise of the draft (Agriculture Appropriations) bills was brokered in December to include the House language. It was this package that was then folded into the continuing resolution or CR sent onto President Barack Obama ... for his signature."

== Text ==
Sec. 735. In the event that a determination of non-regulated status made pursuant to section 411 of the Plant Protection Act is or has been invalidated or vacated, the Secretary of Agriculture shall, notwithstanding any other provision of law, upon request by a farmer, grower, farm operator, or producer, immediately grant temporary permit(s) or temporary deregulation in part, subject to necessary and appropriate conditions consistent with section 411(a) or 412(c) of the Plant Protection Act, which interim conditions shall authorize the movement, introduction, continued cultivation, commercialization and other specifically enumerated activities and requirements, including measures designed to mitigate or minimize potential adverse environmental effects, if any, relevant to the Secretary's evaluation of the petition for non-regulated status, while ensuring that growers or other users are able to move, plant, cultivate, introduce into commerce and carry out other authorized activities in a timely manner: Provided, That all such conditions shall be applicable only for the interim period necessary for the Secretary to complete any required analyses or consultations related to the petition for non-regulated status: Provided further, That nothing in this section shall be construed as limiting the Secretary's authority under section 411, 412 and 414 of the Plant Protection Act.

== Legal effect ==
If a biotech crop had already been approved (or deregulated) by the USDA and a court reversed that approval, the provision directed the Secretary of Agriculture to grant temporary deregulation status at the request of a grower or seed producer, to allow growers to continue the cultivation of the crop while legal challenges to the safety of those crops would still be underway.

NPR reported that Greg Jaffe, director of the Biotechnology Project at the Center for Science in the Public Interest, said that "It's not clear that this provision radically changes the powers USDA has under the law." NPR went on to report that "That's an authority that the USDA has, in fact, already exercised in the past. Back in 2010, a federal judge in San Francisco ruled that the USDA had approved genetically modified sugar beets for commercial planting without adequately assessing their potential environmental impact. The ruling effectively banned future plantings of GMO sugar beets—which made up most of the country's crop—and raised the specter of a sugar shortage. So two giant biotech seed producers—Monsanto and Germany's KWS—petitioned the USDA to issue a "partial deregulation": Essentially, farmers got the go-ahead to keep planting the beets until the USDA's environmental assessment of the crop was complete."

PolitiFact reported that Karen Batra, the spokeswoman for the Biotech Industry Organization, said, "The language in Section 735 codifies existing USDA authority and elements of a 2010 Supreme Court ruling that lower courts should not automatically prohibit the planting of biotech crop varieties, or the harvest and sale of biotech crops already planted, if/when their commercial use is temporarily banned because of a lawsuit. This applies to products that have ALREADY gone through the approval process and already been deregulated by FDA and therefore deemed to be safe for human health and the environment. If the secretary believes that the crop at issue poses a risk in any way, he can forbid its use."

The law containing the provision remained in effect until September 30, 2013.

== Support ==
A joint letter from ten agricultural trade and technology organizations (Note: The Agricultural Retailers Association, the American Farm Bureau Federation, the American Seed Trade Association, the American Soybean Association, the American SugarbeetGrowers Association, the Biotechnology Industry Organization, the National Association of WheatGrowers, the National CornGrowers Association, the National Cotton Council, and the National Council of Farmer Cooperatives) sent to congressmen Hal Rogers and Norman D. Dicks, the chairman and ranking member of the House Committee on Appropriations, on June 12, 2012, stated that the provision was a response to frivolous procedural lawsuits against the USDA which were attempting to "disrupt the regulatory process and undermine the science-based regulation of [agricultural biotechnology]."

Section 733 provides certainty to growers with respect to their planting decisions. If enacted, growers would be assured that the crops they plant could continue to be grown, subject to appropriate interim conditions, even after a judicial ruling against USDA. Moreover, the language would apply only to products that have already satisfactorily completed the U.S. regulatory review process and does not remove or restrict anyone’s right to challenge USDA once a determination of no plant pest risk has been made. The inclusion of Section 733 is a positive step to ensure U.S. farmers and our food chain are shielded from supply disruptions caused by litigation over procedural issues unrelated to sound science or the safety of biotech crops.

== Criticism ==
Those who opposed the provision referred to it as the "Monsanto Protection Act". An amendment proposed by Sen. Jeff Merkley sought, unsuccessfully, to overturn the provision. Merkley's reasoning was that it "allows the unrestricted sale and planting of genetically modified seeds that could be harmful to farmers, the environment and human health". Sen. Bernie Sanders claimed "Essentially, what that Monsanto Protection Act rider said is that even if a court were to determine that a particular product might be harmful to human beings or harmful to the environment, the Department of Agriculture could not stop the production of that product once it is in the ground. So you have deregulated the GMO industry from court oversight, which is really not what America is about."
