= The Non-GMO Project =

Non-profit organization

- Founded: December 16, 2006; 19 years ago
- Founder: Megan Westgate
- Type: Nonprofit organization
- Tax ID no.: 02-0799621
- Legal status: 501(c)(3)
- Purpose: Product certification
- Location: Bellingham, Washington, U.S.
- Chief Executive Officer: Megan Westgate
- Revenue: $4,776,077 (2022)
- Expenses: $5,728,018 (2022)
- Employees: 48 (2021)
- Website: www.nongmoproject.org

The Non-GMO Project is a 501(c)(3) non-profit organization focusing on genetically modified organisms. The organization began as an initiative of independent natural foods retailers in the U.S. and Canada, with the stated aim to label products produced in compliance with their Non-GMO Project Standard, which aims to prevent genetically modified foodstuffs from being present in retail food products. The organization is headquartered in Bellingham, Washington. The Non-GMO label began use in 2012 with Numi Organic Tea products.

== History ==
The Non-GMO Project was incorporated in California on December 14, 2006. Two natural food retailers formed the project, with a goal of creating a standardized definition for non-genetically modified organisms. The project worked with FoodChain Global Advisors which provided the scientific and technical expertise. In spring 2007, the project's board of directors was expanded to include representatives from additional groups, and formed advisory boards for technical and policy issues.

== Mission ==
The Non-GMO Project's stated mission is "to preserve and build sources of non-GMO products, educate consumers, and provide verified non-GMO choices". It provides third-party verification and labeling for non-genetically modified food and products. The project also works with food manufacturers, distributors, growers, and seed suppliers to develop standards for detection of genetically modified organisms and for the reduction of contamination risk of the non-genetically modified food supply with genetically modified organisms. FoodChain Global Advisors, a part of Global ID Group.

The Non-GMO Project claims to "educate consumers and the food industry to help build awareness about GMOs and their impact on our health". It asserts that everyone deserves an informed choice about whether or not to consume genetically modified organisms.

== Standard and label ==
The Non-GMO Project maintains a consensus-based standard, which outlines their system for ensuring best practices for avoiding genetically modified organisms. Methods such as segregation, traceability, risk assessment, sampling techniques, and quality control management are emphasized in the Standard.

The project's Product Verification Program assesses ingredients, products, and manufacturing facilities to establish compliance with the standard. All ingredients with major risk must be tested for compliance with the Non-GMO Project Standard prior to their use in a Non-GMO Project Verified Product. The process is managed through a web-based application and evaluation program developed for the project. The project's label indicates compliance with the standards.

== Sales ==
According to the Non-GMO Project, as of September 2013, Non-GMO Project Verified products exceeded $3.5 billion. This would be approximately 0.4% of the total food sales in the United States ($1.3 trillion in 2012). The Non-GMO Project reports 797 verification program enrollment inquiries in the second quarter of 2013 compared to 194 inquiries during the same period in 2012, representing more than a 300% increase.

== Controversy ==
The Non-GMO Project often puts its labels on products containing inputs it considers "low-risk", including foods with inputs that could not be derived from GMOs. The Project maintains this is because many products that appear to be inherently non-GMO (such as orange juice, oats, tea and table salt) often contain GMO-derived additives (such as citric acid). Some critics say the Project may be using a business model that is based on fear and lack of information.

There is a scientific consensus that currently available food derived from GM crops poses no greater risk to human health than conventional food, but that each GM food needs to be tested on a case-by-case basis before introduction. Nonetheless, members of the public are much less likely than scientists to perceive GM foods as safe. The legal and regulatory status of GM foods varies by country, with some nations banning or restricting them, and others permitting them with widely differing degrees of regulation.

== See also ==
- Genetically modified food controversies
- Health food
- Biological patent
- TRIPS Agreement
