= Hilgardia =

Hilgardia: A Journal of Agricultural Science
- Discipline: Agricultural research
- Language: English

Publication details
- History: 1925–1995, published from 1923 to 1925 under the title Technical Reports
- Publisher: California Agricultural Experiment Station, Berkeley, California (United States)
- Frequency: annual or, sometimes, biennial

Standard abbreviations
- ISO 4: Hilgardia

Indexing
- CODEN: HILGA4
- ISSN: 0073-2230
- LCCN: 28007072
- OCLC no.: 1644088

Links
- Journal homepage

Hilgardia was a peer-reviewed academic journal published by the California Agricultural Experiment Station, which was founded by the Agricultural Experiment Stations Act of 1887. The title honors Eugene W. Hilgard, who was from 1875 to 1904 Professor of Agricultural Chemistry at UC Berkeley and was also the California Agricultural Experiment Station's first Director. The journal, which was published from 1925 (volume 1) to 1995 (volume 62), published a total of 972 articles.

The Hilgardia Project, launched in April 2011, has now made freely available all of the Hilgardia articles in online pdf format. Many of the articles, 71 of which deal with viticulture, are still of scientific and commercial interest. According to Janet White:

Although production ceased in 1995, Hilgardia editions include classic research that is still widely cited in scientific literature, and many are considered cornerstones of current agricultural, environmental and nutritional research.

== Selected publications with high citation numbers ==
- Kleiber, Max (1932). "Body size and metabolism". Hilgardia. 6 (11): 315–353. doi:10.3733/hilg.v06n11p315. (over 2000 citations)
- Moore, Ross E. (1939). "Water conduction from shallow water tables". Hilgardia. 12 (6): 383–426. doi:10.3733/hilg.v12n06p383.
- Anderson, Alfred B. C.; Edlefsen, N. E. (1943). "Thermodynamics of soil moisture". Hilgardia. 15 (2): 31–298. doi:10.3733/hilg.v15n02p031.
- Winkler, A.J.; Amerine, M.A. (1944). "Composition and Quality of Musts and Wines of California Grapes". Hilgardia. 15 (6): 493–675. doi:10.3733/hilg.v15n06p493.
- Allard, R. W. (1956). "Formulas and tables to facilitate the calculation of recombination values in heredity". Hilgardia. 24 (10): 235–278. doi:10.3733/hilg.v24n10p235.
- Huffaker, C. B. (1958). "Experimental studies on predation: Dispersion factors and predator-prey oscillations". Hilgardia. 27 (14): 343–383. doi:10.3733/hilg.v27n14p343. (over 1300 citations)
- Hagen, Kenneth S.; Van Den Bosch, Robert; Smith, Ray F.; Stern, Vernon M. (1959). "The integration of chemical and biological control of the spotted alfalfa aphid: The integrated control concept". Hilgardia. 29 (2): 81–101. doi:10.3733/hilg.v29n02p081. (over 1600 citations)
- Hanau, R.; Williams, W. A.; Loomis, R. S.; Duncan, W. G. (1967). "A model for simulating photosynthesis in plant communities". Hilgardia. 38 (4): 181–205. doi:10.3733/hilg.v38n04p181.
- Van De Vrie, M.; Huffaker, C. B.; McMurtry, J. A. (1970). "Ecology of tetranychid mites and their natural enemies: A review: I. Tetranychid enemies: Their biological characters and the impact of spray practices". Hilgardia. 40 (11): 331–390. doi:10.3733/hilg.v40n11p331.
- Huffaker, C. B.; McMurtry, J. A.; Van De Vrie, M. (1972). "Ecology of tetranychid mites and their natural enemies: A review: III. Biology, ecology, and pest status, and host-plant relations of tetranychids". Hilgardia. 41 (13): 343–432. doi:10.3733/hilg.v41n13p343.
- Biggar, J. W.; Nielsen, D. R.; Hatfield, J. L.; Vieira, S. R. (1983). "Geostatistical theory and application to variability of some agronomical properties". Hilgardia. 51 (3): 1–75. doi:10.3733/hilg.v51n03p075.
- Letey, J.; Shainberg, I. (1984). "Response of soils to sodic and saline conditions". Hilgardia. 52 (2): 1–57. doi:10.3733/hilg.v52n02p057.
