= Andrew Paul Gutiérrez =

American biologist and ecologist (1940-2026)

- Andrew Paul Gutiérrez at the University of California, Berkeley
- Born: January 25, 1940; St. Johns, Arizona, U.S.
- Died: June 7, 2026 (aged 86); Kensington, California, U.S.
- Citizenship: United States, Italy
- Education: Arizona State College, Flagstaff (BS, 1962); University of California, Berkeley (MSc, 1966; PhD, 1968)
- Known for: Physiologically based demographic model (PBDM); metabolic pool paradigm; agroecosystem analysis; cassava pest biocontrol in sub-Saharan Africa; bioeconomic analysis of Bt cotton in India; founding of the University of California IPM Project
- Spouse: Marina Angela Pizzamiglio-Gutiérrez
- Awards: NIH Fellowship (1967–1968); King Baudouin Award (IITA, Nigeria); Robert van den Bosch Medal (2011); Fellow of the Royal Entomological Society (FRES, 2017)
- Scientific career
- Fields: Ecology, Entomology, Biological control, Agroecology, Population ecology, Bioeconomics
- Workplaces: CSIRO, Canberra (1968–1970); Purdue University (1970–1972); University of British Columbia (1972–1974); University of California, Berkeley, Division of Biological Control (1972–1974; 1976–2008); University of California, Davis (1974–1976); CASAS Global (2008–2026)
- Doctoral advisor: Robert van den Bosch
- Website: www.casasglobal.org

Andrew Paul Gutiérrez FRES (January 25, 1940 – June 7, 2026) was an American biologist, ecologist, entomologist, biological control specialist, and agricultural systems analyst who spent most of his career as a professor and then, from his retirement until his death, as professor emeritus in the Graduate School at the University of California, Berkeley. A dual national of the United States and Italy, he is recognized for his foundational contributions to agroecosystem analysis, biological control, and the development of physiologically based demographic models (PBDMs) for complex agricultural systems. He published more than 300 peer-reviewed scientific papers, contributed to several books, and has been cited more than 16,000 times according to Google Scholar.

Gutiérrez is best known for co-developing (with Johann Baumgärtner of ETH Zurich) the metabolic pool paradigm, a bioeconomic modeling framework that captures weather-driven energy acquisition and allocation within organisms, including economic humans, that applies to all trophic levels. His research had global impact, from guiding landmark cassava pest biocontrol programs that kept starvation at bay for more than 200 million people in sub-Saharan Africa to critically analyzing the socioeconomic consequences of hybrid Bt cotton adoption in India.

His spouse, Marina Angela Pizzamiglio-Gutierrez (formerly of the Instituto Agronômico do Paraná - IAPAR, Londrina, PR, Brazil) is an entomologist (MSc, UC Berkeley). They coauthored several scientific papers.

== Early life and education ==
Andrew Paul Gutiérrez was born on January 25, 1940, in St. Johns, Arizona. He graduated from high school in Winslow, Arizona in 1957. Due to financial constraints, he spent three years out of school before enrolling in higher education. He received a Bachelor of Science in zoology from Arizona State College, Flagstaff, Arizona (now Northern Arizona University) in 1962.

From 1962 to 1965, he worked as a lab technician in pesticide research at the University of California, Berkeley before pursuing a master's degree there with KS Hagen.

In 1965, Gutiérrez entered graduate school at the University of California, Berkeley, where he studied under Professor Robert van den Bosch, author of the internationally renowned book The Pesticide Conspiracy, becoming van den Bosch's first doctoral student. He earned an MSc in 1966 and a PhD in ecology and entomology in 1968, specializing in insect behavior, biological control, and applied agroecosystem analysis.

== Career ==
=== Early career (1968–1976) ===
Following his doctorate, Gutiérrez joined CSIRO in Canberra, Australia (1968–1970) as a research scientist, where he investigated the regional dynamics and seasonal migration of the cowpea aphid (Aphis craccivora) and two viruses it vectors across pasture systems in southeastern Australia. This work represented one of the earliest applications of geographic information system (GIS) methods to map the potential distribution of an insect pest using weather-driven physiological indices, and directly contributed to the development of the species distribution modeling software CLIMEX.

After returning from Australia, Gutiérrez held several successive positions: Assistant Professor at Purdue University (1970–1972); postdoctoral fellow at the University of British Columbia, working on aphid population ecology with Neil Gilbert; and postdoctoral researcher in the Division of Biological Control at UC Berkeley (1972–1974), working again with Robert van den Bosch on insecticide-induced ecological disruption in cotton systems in California's Great Central Valley, work that concluded there were no major pests of cotton in the Great Central Valley of California. He subsequently served as assistant professor at the University of California, Davis (1974–1976).

=== University of California, Berkeley (1976–2008) ===
In 1976, Gutiérrez joined the Division of Biological Control at University of California, Berkeley as Professor I, rising through the ranks to become emeritus Professor IX+ upon his retirement in 2008. His major research focus was agroecosystem analysis and bioeconomics, an approach that combines ecological modeling with economic principles to analyze the behavior and management of complex agricultural systems.

During his tenure at Berkeley, Gutiérrez conceived and led the development of the University of California Statewide IPM Project (now the UC IPM Program) and served as associate director of the NSF/EPA/USDA-funded National IPM Projects (the Huffaker, Smith, and Adkisson Projects), with his research voted as exemplary by a U.S. President's Council on Environmental Quality.

During this period, Gutiérrez held international appointments as a U.S. member of the International Institute for Applied Systems Analysis (IIASA, Laxenburg, Austria), as a member of the IITA/Nigeria research group that received the King Baudouin Award, and as a member of the FAO Panel of Experts in IPM in Rome, Italy. He also participated in various CGIAR and USAID committees. Over the course of his career he held numerous consultancies and taught courses in agroecosystem analysis worldwide.

Gutiérrez's work was multi-disciplinary, spanning fields as diverse as insect behavior and field ecology, economics, population ecology, systems analysis, and modeling. He described field ecology as his forte, but much of his research focused on applied systems analysis of complex agricultural systems using bioeconomic methods, summarized in his book Applied Population Ecology: A Supply–Demand Approach (1996). He also co-edited the second edition of Ecological Entomology (1999) with C. B. Huffaker.

=== Post-retirement (2008-2026) ===
Following his formal retirement from UC Berkeley in 2008, Gutiérrez remained highly active in research. He founded and served as CEO of the Center for the Analysis of Sustainable Agricultural Systems (CASAS Global), based in Kensington, California. Through CASAS Global, and in collaboration with Luigi Ponti at Agenzia nazionale per le nuove tecnologie, l'energia e lo sviluppo economico sostenibile (ENEA), he led a consortium of international researchers conducting weather-driven, GIS-based analyses of agricultural crop systems and invasive species, including alfalfa, bumblebees, cassava, coffee, cotton, grape, olive, and the New World screwworm. A central theme of this post-retirement work was assessing the impacts of climate change on crop systems, pest distributions, and biological control efficacy. Of particular interest were studies of invasive insect pests and weeds, and the effects of climate warming on these systems.

== Research contributions ==
=== Physiologically based demographic model (PBDM) ===
Gutiérrez is best known for co-developing, with Johann Baumgärtner (ETH Zurich), the physiologically based demographic model (PBDM) and its associated metabolic pool (MP) paradigm. The PBDM/MP framework models the per capita, weather-driven acquisition and allocation of energy (biomass) by organisms, including economic humans, capturing the bio-economics of individuals and the dynamics of populations up to multi-species metapopulations across geographic space (for example, continental Africa), time, and conditions of global change.

The bioeconomic foundations of the PBDM were formalized in collaboration with Professor Uri Regev (Ben-Gurion University of the Negev, Beer-Sheva, Israel). The physiological underpinnings trace to the crop simulation work of C.T. de Wit and J. Goudriaan (Wageningen University, The Netherlands), while the demographic framework draws from the work of Neil Gilbert (CSIRO, Australia, and the University of British Columbia). The PBDM methods have since been implemented by research groups globally.

=== Cassava pest management in sub-Saharan Africa ===
Gutiérrez's systems analysis of cassava pests in sub-Saharan Africa, carried out with colleagues and former students, was notable for its scale, its importance to food security, and its contribution to one of the most successful biological control programs in history, which kept starvation at bay for more than 200 million people in sub-Saharan Africa. Former UC Berkeley post-doctoral fellow Hans Herren directed the cassava mealybug biocontrol field program; he was subsequently awarded the World Food Prize and other international prizes for this work.

=== Bt cotton bioeconomics in India ===
Gutiérrez led a multi-disciplinary bioeconomic analysis of hybrid Bt cotton adoption in India, encompassing ecological, economic, and social dimensions within a single modeling framework. The study examined the relationship between Bt cotton adoption, yield outcomes, and the farm-level debt crisis associated with a wave of farmer suicides in India, in which more than 300,000 farmers across all crops had died by suicide since 1995. Subsequent papers extended this analysis and offered critiques of industry-sponsored assessments of Bt cotton productivity.

=== Integrated pest management ===
Gutiérrez was the founder of the University of California Statewide IPM Project and served as associate director of the nationally funded IPM Projects (Huffaker, Smith, and Adkisson Projects). His work in this domain helped establish a scientific basis for reducing reliance on synthetic pesticides in California agriculture and contributed to the broader development of integrated pest management as a discipline.

=== Biological control efficacy prediction ===
In his last published work, Gutiérrez demonstrated that well-parameterized PBDMs could be used to predict, ex ante, the potential efficacy of introduced natural enemies in classical biological control programs; a development with significant implications for pre-release evaluation of biocontrol agents.

== Awards and honors ==
- National Institutes of Health (NIH) Fellowship (1967–1968)
- King Baudouin Award, as part of the IITA/Nigeria research group
- Robert van den Bosch Medal (2011)
- Fellow of the Royal Entomological Society of London (FRES, 2017)
- Research projects recognized as exemplary by a U.S. President's Council on Environmental Quality

== Selected publications ==
=== Books ===
- Gutierrez, A.P. (1996). Applied Population Ecology: A Supply-Demand Approach. New York: John Wiley and Sons. ISBN 978-0-471-13586-9.
- Huffaker, C.B.; Gutierrez, A.P. (1999). Ecological Entomology (2nd ed.). John Wiley and Sons. ISBN 978-0-471-24483-7.

=== Selected articles ===
- Gutierrez, A.P. (1992). "The physiological basis of ratio-dependent predator-prey theory: the metabolic pool model as a paradigm". Ecology. 73 (5): 1552–1563. doi:10.2307/1940008.
- Regev, U.; Gutierrez, A.P.; Schreiber, S.J.; Zilberman, D. (1998). "Biological and economic foundations of renewable resource exploitation". Ecological Economics. 26 (3): 227–242. doi:10.1016/S0921-8009(97)00103-1.
- Gutierrez, A.P.; Ponti, L.; Herren, H.R.; Baumgärtner, J.U.; Kenmore, P.E. (2015). "Deconstructing Indian cotton: weather, yields, and suicides". Environmental Sciences Europe. 27 (12) 12. doi:10.1186/s12302-015-0043-8.
- Gutierrez, A.P.; Ponti, L. (2013). "Eradication of invasive species: why the biology matters". Environmental Entomology. 42 (3): 395–411. doi:10.1603/EN12018.
- Gutierrez, A. P.; Ponti, L.; Neteler, M.; Stocchino, F.; Cure, J. R.; Kenmore, P. E.; Simmons, G. (2025). "Geospatial physiologically based demographic modeling and analysis of thirteen invasive species in Africa: why the biology matters". Environmental Sciences Europe. 37 (1) 67. Bibcode:2025ESEur..37...67G. doi:10.1186/s12302-025-01084-y.
- Gutierrez, A.P.; Ponti, L.; Neuenschwander, P.; Yaninek, J.S.; Herren, H.R. (2025). "Ex ante analyses to predict the efficacy of natural enemies in biological control". Scientific Reports. 15 (1). Nature Portfolio: 44886. doi:10.1038/s41598-025-29022-1. hdl:10568/179874.
