= Vernon M. Stern =

American entomologist

Vernon Mark Stern (March 28, 1923 – March 16, 2006) was an American professor of entomology at the University of California, Riverside considered as one of the founding figures of integrated pest management.

Stern along with Ray F. Smith, Robert van den Bosch and Kenneth Hagen established the concept of integrated control in 1959. Another of his ideas was the use of strip-cropping between the main crop to maintain populations of beneficial insects. He demonstrated this with the use of alfalfa strips in cotton to manage lygaeid bugs. He also developed the concept of economic injury level and other economic thresholds about which he wrote an influential review paper in 1973. He also made use of innovative study techniques such as the use of fluorescent dust to mark and study the dispersal of weevils in grape fields. He worked at the University of California from 1956 until he retired in 1991.
