= CYP318A1 =

Cytochrome P450 318A1

Identifiers
- Organism: Drosophila melanogaster
- Symbol: Cyp318a1
- Alt. symbols: CYPCCCXVIIIA1
- Entrez: 32172
- Orthologs: NCBI: entry; OMA: entry
- UniProt: Q9VYQ5

Other data
- EC number: 1.14.-.-
- Chromosome: X: 12.03 - 12.04 Mb
Search for
- Structures: Swiss-model
- Domains: InterPro

CYP318A1 (ORF Name: Dmel_CG1786) is a Drosophila melanogaster gene belongs to the cytochrome P450 family, involved in the insecticide resistance.
