= James R. Carey =

American academic

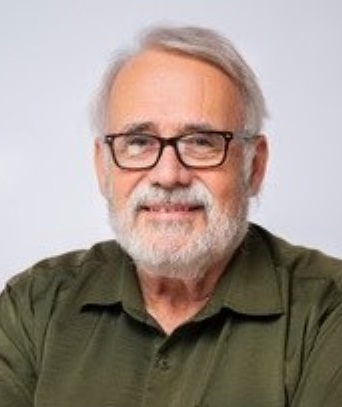
- Born: October 26, 1947 (age 79)
- Occupations: Entomologist, biodemographer, author and academic
- Title: Distinguished Professor of Entomology, University of California, Davis; Senior Scholar, Center for the Economics and Demography of Aging, University of California, Berkeley

Academic background
- Education: Iowa State University (BS, 1973; MS, 1975); University of California, Berkeley (PhD, 1980)
- Doctoral advisor: Robert van den Bosch; Carl Huffaker; Harold Gordon

Academic work
- Discipline: Biodemography
- Notable works: Carey's Equality (Stationary population identity); Biodemography: An Introduction to Concepts and Methods (Princeton University Press, 2020)

James Robert Carey is an entomologist, biodemographer, author and academic. He is Distinguished Professor of Entomology at the University of California, Davis and Senior Scholar in the Center for the Economics and Demography of Aging (CEDA) at UC Berkeley.

Carey is most known for his research on biodemography and fruit fly invasion biology. The Stanford University and Elsevier Press ranking system for scientists that lists most-cited authors in 2021-22 listed him in the top 2% of most cited entomologists worldwide. He has demographer-named mathematical discovery, known as the Carey Equality, which equates years lived and years left in replacement populations. He is a co-author of the book Biodemography: An Introduction to Concepts and Methods with Deborah A. Roach, and Longevity Records: Life Spans of Mammals, Birds, Amphibians and Reptiles with Debra S. Judge as well as the author of other books, including Applied Demography for Biologists, and Longevity: The Biology and Demography of Life Span, along with over 200 journal articles and book chapters. He is the recipient of C. W. Woodworth Award, Distinguished Service Award, and Distinguished Teaching Award from the UC Davis Academic Senate, and Two Distinguished Teaching Awards from the Entomological Society of America.

Carey is a Fellow of the American Association for the Advancement of Science (AAAS), Gerontological Society of America (GSA), California Academy of Sciences (CAS), and the Entomological Society of America (ESA). He serves as a Co-designer and Adviser for the Cameroon-based NGO Agriculture for Africa.

== Education ==
Carey earned his Bachelor of Science in Fisheries and Wildlife Biology from Iowa State University in 1973, followed by a Master of Science in entomology in 1975. He pursued his Ph.D. in entomology at the University of California, Berkeley, completing the program in 1980 under the mentorship of Robert van den Bosch and Carl Huffacker. During the 1978 academic year, he was a visiting Ph.D. student at Harvard University, working in the laboratories of population biologists Richard Lewontin and Richard Levins.

== Career ==
After joining the University of California, Davis as an assistant professor in 1980, Carey was promoted to associate professor in 1987 and then to Professor in 1992. From 1989 to 2005, he served as the Principal Investigator for the NIH/NIA Duke-based project, Oldest Old Mortality. Additionally, from 2003 to 2013, he held the position of Program Director for the NIH/NIA Aging in the Wild project.

Additionally, he has been a Senior Scholar at the Center on the Economics and Demography of Aging at the University of California, Berkeley, since 1996, and Distinguished Professor of Entomology at the University of California since 2014.

== Research ==
Carey has conducted research on insect demography, mortality dynamics, insect invasion biology, and biodemography.

=== Biodemography ===
In the early 1990s, Carey shifted from insect ecology to biodemography, completing a demography-based PhD, teaching insect demography, and authoring a book on biological demography, Applied Demography for Biologists with special emphasis on insects. This 1993 book was the first to apply demographic tools to a nonhuman species, covering standard techniques, and addressing unique demographic problems. A review in the European Journal of Entomology praised its comprehensive coverage, and William J. Cromartie, reviewing for The Quarterly Review of Biology, underscored that, "This book treats demography more completely than any general ecology or population biology volume." He also added, "Carey introduces a range of demographic literature not included in most intermediate and advanced textbooks on ecology and entomology."

Carey integrated biology with human demography. He is the lead author of the book Biodemography: An Introduction to Concepts and Methods, with Deborah Roach, published in 2020. This book has covered baseline models, biodemographic applications, and drawn from diverse species' datasets. A review published in Trends in Ecology and Evolution lauded him and Roach for delivering an excellent introduction to the concepts and methods that underpin biodemography.

Carey also produced a video guidebook on UC Berkeley's Population Sciences website, comprising 175 presentations covering the entire textbook. This resource integrated biology, mathematics, and demography, covering life tables, applied demography, and visualization strategies.

=== Mortality dynamics/slowing ===
Carey's highly cited paper on "slowing of mortality at older ages," has centered around his discovery that mortality slows at advanced ages. The UC Davis College of Agriculture and Environmental Science acknowledged this as one of the "100 Ways in Which Our College Has Shaped the World." In a 1998 collaborative work, he explored increased old-age survival, investigated extended postreproductive life, and suggested studying death rate correlation and fertility-longevity interactions, noting nongenetic factors in longer human life-spans without explicitly mentioning "Biodemographic Trajectories."

=== Carey's Equality ===
While attempting to develop a method for estimating the age structure of insect populations by monitoring the remaining lifespans of randomly capture fruit flies of unknown ages, Carey discovered a mathematical relationship in a life table population to which the mathematical demographer James Vaupel, assigned the eponym Carey's Equality. In his 2013 inaugural address to the Evolutionary Demography Society, Vaupel expressed that Carey's Equality is one of the most remarkable discoveries related to life tables. This relationship, now more generally known as the Stationary Population Identity (SPI), equates two distributions in closed, replacement populations: the distributions of age and of remaining lifespans. The model states: "In closed stationary populations with fixed birth and death rates the fraction of individuals age x equals the fraction of individuals with x years yet to live". For example, if 15% of a population are 65 years and older, then the SPI model shows that exactly 15% of this population have 65 or more years remaining to live. The reciprocity of life lived and left establishes the identity—i.e., each value can be derived from the other. From the perspective of estimating age structure in wild populations, this means that, hypothetically due to the requirement of population stationarity, a populations age structure can be estimated from only the remaining life distribution of individuals captured in the wild without knowing the age of any.

=== Arthropod demography ===
Carey has made contributions to the field of arthropod demography, and published the world's largest compendium of documented vertebrate life spans, titled Longevity Records: Life Spans of Mammals, Birds, Amphibians and Reptiles covering 3000+ species and noting wild or captive status across mammals, birds, reptiles, amphibians, and fish.

=== Invasion biology ===
Carey has also researched the demography and invasion biology of tephritid fruit flies. In particular, his work in invasion biology focused on researching and advocating for California's invasive pests—the Mediterranean Fruit Fly (medfly) and the Light Brown Apple Moth (LBAM). For these efforts, he received the UC Davis Academic Senate Distinguished Scholarly Public Service Award. His analysis of the medfly infestation has been covered in newspapers including The Miami Herald, Los Angeles Times, and New York Times.

Carey has conducted research on the threats posed by invasive species to California's agricultural industry. His research has shown that these pests resist eradication, persisting and spreading despite over 30 years of intervention and nearly 300 state programs. In 1989, as part of the state's Medfly Science Advisory Panel, he testified to the California State Assembly that the medfly was established, and eradication would be extraordinarily difficult.

Concerns about the nature of the invasion prompted him to write in a paper for Science on medfly establishment. This 1991 work generated discussions within the entomological community on eradication definitions, subdetectable levels of invasive pests, and the necessity for a paradigm shift in invasion biology of economically and medically significant arthropod pests. The coverage by New York Times' Retro Reports in 2014 highlighted his role, leading to the cancellation of the state's aerial Malathion spraying.

Alongside Bruce Hammock and Frank Zalom, he wrote to the U.S. Secretary of Agriculture, disputing a proposed method's validity and asserting that LBAM is not a significant pest. In 2022, he was the lead author a paper highly critical of the decision makers in the LBAM program, titled Failure by design: Lessons from the recently rescinded light brown apple moth eradication program in California.

In a 2013 publication, Carey and his colleagues disclosed that at least five, potentially up to nine, fruit fly species of 17 studied are permanently established in California and likely cannot be eradicated. Presenting these findings to international fruit fly entomologists in Crete, his subsequent paper, published in October 2013 in the journal American Entomologist, has remained significant. Science magazine covered his key role in medfly and LBAM science policy at UC Davis.

== Awards and honors ==
- 2000 – Fellow, American Association for the Advancement of Science
- 2003 – Fellow, Gerontological Society of America
- 2010 – Fellow, California Academy of Sciences
- 2011 – Fellow, Entomological Society of America
- 2013 – C. W. Woodworth Award, Pacific Branch of the Entomological Society of America (PBESA)
- 2013 – Distinguished Service Award, UC Davis Academic Senate
- 2014 – Distinguished Teaching Award, UC Davis Academic Senate
- 2015 – Two Distinguished Teaching Awards, Entomological Society of America
- 2017 – Semifinalist Robert Foster Cherry Award for Great Teaching Program, Baylor University

== Bibliography ==
=== Selected books ===
- Applied Demography for Biologists: With Special Emphasis on Insects (1993) ISBN 978-0-19-506687-6
- Longevity Records: Life Spans of Mammals, Birds, Amphibians and Reptiles (2000) ISBN 978-87-7838-539-0
- Longevity: The Biology and Demography of Life Span (2003) ISBN 978-0-691-08849-5
- Biodemography: An Introduction to Concepts and Methods (2020) ISBN 978-0-691-12900-6

=== Edited proceedings ===
- Carey, J.R.; Moyle, P.B.; Rejmánek, M.; Vermeij, G. (October 1996). "Preface". Biological Conservation. 78 (1–2): 1–2. Bibcode:1996BCons..78....1C. doi:10.1016/S0006-3207(96)90007-5.
- Carey, James R.; Tuljapurkar, Shripad (2003). Life Span: Evolutionary, Ecological, and Demographic Perspectives. Population Council. ISBN 978-0-87834-103-0. OCLC 1264249857.

=== Selected journal articles ===
- Carey, James R. (20 September 1991). "Establishment of the Mediterranean Fruit Fly in California". Science. 253 (5026): 1369–1373. Bibcode:1991Sci...253.1369C. doi:10.1126/science.1896848. PMID 1896848.
- Carey, James R.; Liedo, Pablo; Orozco, Dina; Vaupel, James W. (16 October 1992). "Slowing of Mortality Rates at Older Ages in Large Medfly Cohorts". Science. 258 (5081): 457–461. Bibcode:1992Sci...258..457C. doi:10.1126/science.1411540. PMID 1411540.
- Carey, James R.; Liedo, Pablo; Müller, Hans-Georg; Wang, Jane-Ling; Vaupel, James W. (14 August 1998). "Dual Modes of Aging in Mediterranean Fruit Fly Females". Science. 281 (5379): 996–998. Bibcode:1998Sci...281..996C. doi:10.1126/science.281.5379.996. PMID 9703516.
- Carey, James R.; Papadopoulos, Nikos T.; Müller, Hans-Georg; Katsoyannos, Byron I.; Kouloussis, Nikos A.; Wang, Jane-Ling; Wachter, Kenneth; Yu, Wei; Liedo, Pablo (June 2008). "Age structure changes and extraordinary lifespan in wild medfly populations". Aging Cell. 7 (3): 426–437. doi:10.1111/j.1474-9726.2008.00390.x. PMC 2398686. PMID 18363903.
- Carey, James R.; Silverman, Sarah; Srinivasa Rao, Arni S.R. (2018). "The Life Table Population Identity: Discovery, Formulations, Proof, Extensions, and Applications". Integrated Population Biology and Modeling, Part A. Handbook of Statistics. Vol. 39. pp. 155–186. doi:10.1016/bs.host.2018.08.002. ISBN 978-0-444-64072-7.
- Carey, James R.; Judge, Debra S. (September 2001). "Life Span Extension in Humans Is Self-Reinforcing: A General Theory of Longevity". Population and Development Review. 27 (3): 411–436. doi:10.1111/j.1728-4457.2001.00411.x.
- Carey, James R. (2003). "Life Span: A Conceptual Overview". Population and Development Review. 29: 1–18. JSTOR 3401343.
- Vaupel, James W.; Carey, James R.; Christensen, Kaare; Johnson, Thomas E.; Yashin, Anatoli I.; Holm, Niels V.; Iachine, Ivan A.; Kannisto, Väinö; Khazaeli, Aziz A.; Liedo, Pablo; Longo, Valter D.; Zeng, Yi; Manton, Kenneth G.; Curtsinger, James W. (8 May 1998). "Biodemographic Trajectories of Longevity". Science. 280 (5365): 855–860. Bibcode:1998Sci...280..855V. doi:10.1126/science.280.5365.855. PMID 9599158.
- Carey, James R. (January 2001). "Insect biodemography". Annual Review of Entomology. 46 (1): 79–110. doi:10.1146/annurev.ento.46.1.79. PMID 11112164.
- Carey, James R.; Eriksen, Brinsley; Srinivasa Rao, Arni S.R. (2024). "Government as population: Demographic perspectives on the United States legislative, judicial and executive branches, 1789–2020". Modeling and Analysis of Longitudinal Data. Handbook of Statistics. Vol. 50. pp. 225–266. doi:10.1016/bs.host.2023.10.004. ISBN 978-0-443-13651-1.
