= James Carey =

James (or Jim) Carey, Cary, or Carrey may refer to:

== Entertainment ==
- James Carrey or Jim Carrey (born 1962), Canadian actor
- James Cary (writer), British television and radio writer

== Military ==
- James L. Carey (1839–1919), Union Army soldier and Medal of Honor recipient
- James Carey (Medal of Honor) (born c. 1845), United States Navy sailor and Medal of Honor recipient
- James J. Carey (born 1939), United States Navy admiral

== Others ==
- James Carey (Fenian) (1845–1883), Irish rebel conspirator turned informant
- James Cary (bishop) (fl. 1419), English bishop of Coventry and Lichfield
- James F. Carey (1867–1938), American socialist politician
- James B. Carey (1911–1973), founding president of International Union of Electrical Workers
- James B. Carey (judge) (1905–1979), justice of the Delaware Supreme Court
- James W. Carey (1934–2006), American communications theorist
- Jim Carey (ice hockey) (born 1974), American ice hockey goaltender
- Jim Carey (basketball) (1929–2006), American college basketball coach
- James R. Carey (born 1947), American entomologist
