= Huffaker =

Huffaker may refer to:

== People ==
- Clair Huffaker (1926–1990), American author of Western fiction
- Carl B. Huffaker (1914–1995), American biologist and agricultural scientist
- Scott Huffaker (born 1999), American racing driver

== Places ==
- Huffaker, a district in Rome, Georgia
- Huffaker, Illinois, a populated place in Sangamon County
- Huffaker, Nevada, a former settlement in Washoe County
- Huffaker, Utah, a populated place in Salt Lake County
