= Resurgence (pest) =

Effect of pesticide use

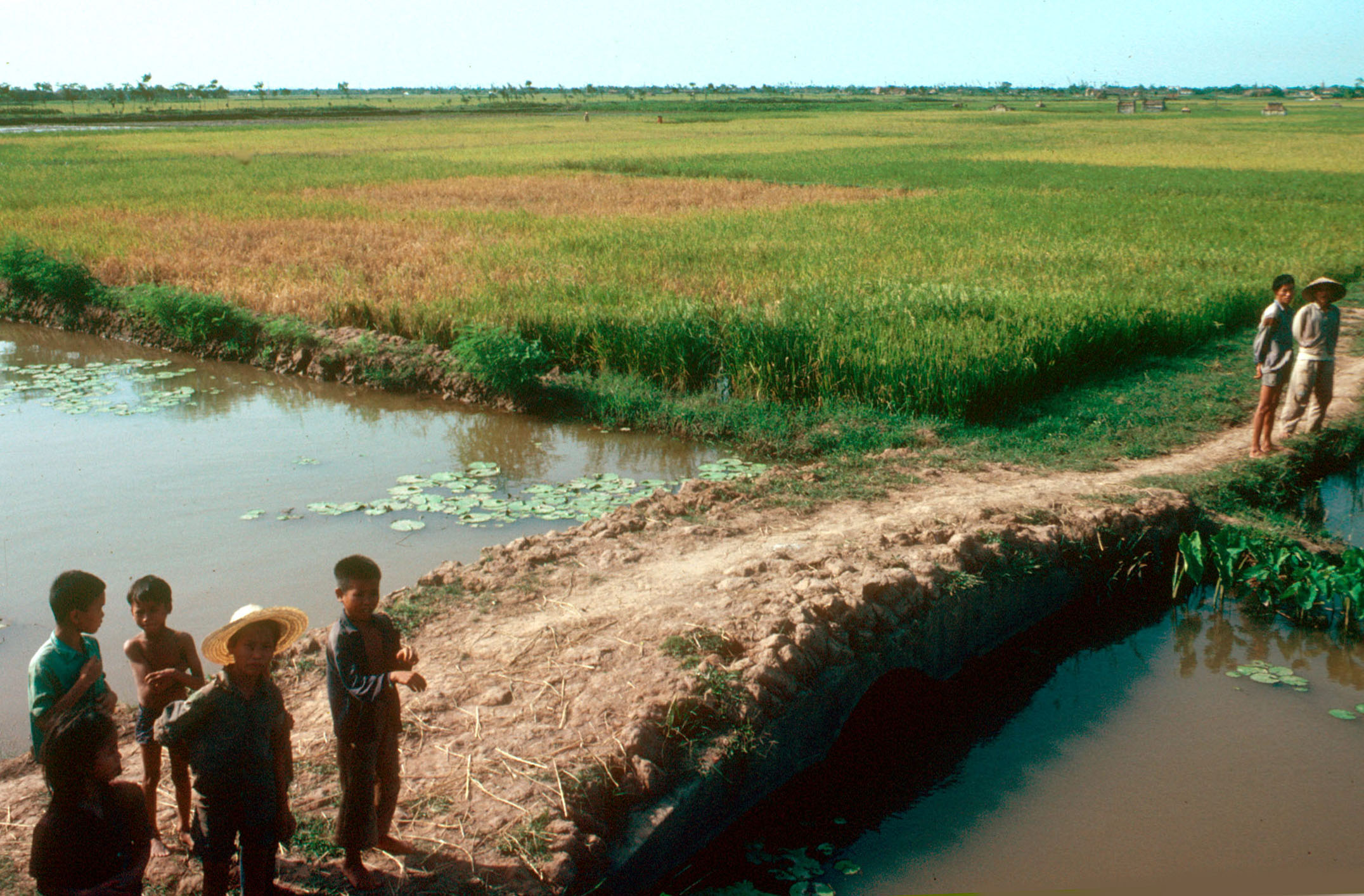
Hopper-burn of rice in Vietnam following agricultural intensification in the early 1980s: that included the introduction of broad-spectrum insecticides

Pesticide induced resurgence, often shortened to resurgence in pest management contexts, can be described as a constraint of pesticide use, by which they fail to control pests such as insects and spider mites: instead ‘flaring up’ populations that may have been of minor importance. Although there are more than one mechanisms by which this takes place, mortality of natural enemies following the use of broad-spectrum insecticides and acaricides is often implicated. This is sometimes called the “pesticide treadmill”: a term coined by Robert van den Bosch to describe a self-reinforcing over-dependence on agrochemicals and inimical to natural biological controls. Notable examples include the flare-up of rice brown planthopper populations, following over-use of broad-spectrum insecticides.

The phenomenon has also been called paradox of the pesticides: where applying pesticide to a pest may end up increasing the abundance of the pest or other pests if the pesticide upsets natural predator–prey dynamics in the ecosystem.

== Causes ==
With an increasing population, world food production has been subject to intensification and since the 1950s, the use of chemical pesticides. Examples are included below, but because of its importance to rice, outbreaks of the brown planthopper were studied intensively. The differential mortality of the pests and their natural enemies (spiders, parasitoids, predatory bugs, etc.) was a major factor causing outbreaks. However, there were other resurgence factors such as increased pest fecundity due to increased protein content of the rice phloem, on which the insects feed.

== Mitigation ==
Sustainable intensification encompasses Integrated pest management (IPM) practices, which are widely recognised as an appropriate strategy for, not only reducing financial costs to farmers and growers, but also managing technical constraints associated with pesticide resistance, resurgence and the risks of high crop residues. An obvious solution is to reduce or eliminate pesticide use, but where pest pressure is high (e.g. with many tropical crops), this is not always feasible: but various measures can be taken, including better timing, application and the use of less deleterious products such as biopesticides.

To deal with the paradox, growers may turn to integrated pest management (IPM), an ecological approach to pest control that accounts for the interactions between pests and their environment. There is not only one way to practice IPM, but some methods include using mechanical trapping devices or increasing the abundance of natural predators.

IPM is also often touted for its environmental and health benefits, since insecticides are sprayed only when a threshold of damage is reached.

== Examples ==
Cottony cushion scale Icerya purchasi

Management of Icerya purchasi populations is a well-known early success for classical biological control, after introduction of the vedalia ladybird in the late 19th century. However, crop spraying with DDT and organophosphate insecticides in the 1950s, resulted in high vedalia mortality and cottony cushion scale resurgence; this was especially caused by drift of malathion or DDT applied by airplane during the early spring months.

Spider mites

First generation insecticides such as DDT were often replaced by synthetic pyrethroids for agricultural and horticultural use by the end of the 1970s, due to their relatively low persistence and mammalian toxicity. However, their broad spectrum of activity varies for both spider mite control, and their ability to invoke resurgences of different spider mite species on various plants. Pesticides may be both lethal and repellent to Phytoseiids and other spider mite predators. After synthetic pyrethroids applications, spider mite development is shortened, the sex ratio can becomes more biased towards females and onset of winter diapause is possibly delayed.

Predatory mites naturally prey upon phytophagous mites, which are common pests in apple orchards. Spraying the orchards kills both mites, but the effect of diminished predation is larger than that of the pesticide, and phytophagous mites increase in abundance.

The effect has also been seen on rice, as documented by the International Rice Research Institute, which noted significant declines in pest populations when they stopped applying pesticide.

== Related phenomena ==
Recent studies suggest that such a paradox might not be necessarily caused by the reduction of the predator population by harvesting itself, for example, by a pesticide. The host population is reduced at the moment of harvesting, and simultaneously, the intraspecific density effect is weakened. Intraspecific competition accounts for the competition between individuals of a same species. When the population density is high and resources are consequently relatively scarce, each individual has less access to resources to invest energy in growth, survivorship and reproduction. That causes a decrease in the survival rate or an increase in mortality.

Intraspecific competition increases with density. One could expect that a population decrease (due to harvesting, for example) will decrease the population density and reduce intraspecific competition, which would lead to a lower death rate among the prey population.

Studies show also that direct effects on the predator population, through harvesting of the prey, are not necessary to observe the paradox. Harvesting of prey has been shown to trigger a reduction in the predator’s reproduction rate, which lowers the equilibrium predator level. Thus, changes in life history strategy (patterns of growth, reproduction and survivorship) can also contribute to the paradox.

Seemingly the paradox can be accounted for by the indirect effects of harvesting on the native ecological interactions of prey and predator: reduction of intraspecific density effect for the prey and reduction of the reproductive rate for the predator. The former increases the population recovery of the prey, and the latter decreases the equilibrium population level for the predator.

== Mathematical modelling ==
To describe the paradox of the pesticides mathematically, the Lotka–Volterra equation, a set of first-order, nonlinear, differential equations, which are frequently used to describe predator–prey interactions, can be modified to account for the additions of pesticides into the predator–prey interactions.

=== Without pesticides ===
The variables represent the following:

$$\begin{align}
H & = \text{the prey population at a given time} \\
P & = \text{the predator population at a given time} \\
c & = \text{the capture constant} \\
r & = \text{the rate of growth of the prey population} \\
a & = \text{the fraction of prey energy assimilated by the predator and turned into new predators} \\
m & = \text{predator mortality rate} \\
\end{align}$$

The following two equations are the original Lotka–Volterra equation, which describe the rate of change of each respective population as a function of the population of the other organism:

$$\begin{align}
\frac{dH}{dt} & = rH - cHP \\
\frac{dP}{dt} & = acHP - mP \\
\end{align}$$

By setting each equation to zero and thus assuming a stable population, a graph of two lines (isoclines) can be made to find the equilibrium point, the point at which both interacting populations are stable.

These are the isoclines for the two above equations:

$$P=\frac{r}{c} \quad \text{and} \quad H=\frac{m}{ac}$$

=== Accounting for pesticides ===
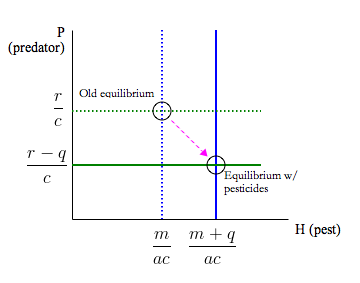
Predator–prey isoclines before and after pesticide application. Pest abundance has increased.

Now, to account for the difference in the population dynamics of the predator and prey that occurs with the addition of pesticides, variable q is added to represent the per capita rate at which both species are killed by the pesticide. The original Lotka–Volterra equations change to be as follows:

$$\begin{align}
\frac{dH}{dt} & = H(r-cP-q) \\
\frac{dP}{dt} & = P(acH-m-q) \\
\end{align}$$

Solving the isoclines as was done above, the following equations represent the two lines with the intersection that represents the new equilibrium point. These are the new isoclines for the populations:

$$P=\frac{r-q}{c} \quad \text{and} \quad H=\frac{m+q}{ac}$$

As one can see from the new isoclines, the new equilibrium will have a higher H value and a lower P value so the number of prey will increase while the number of predator decreases. Thus, prey, which is normally the targeted by the pesticide, is actually being benefited instead of harmed by the pesticide.

== See also ==
- Plateau effect
- List of paradoxes
- Paradox of enrichment: Increasing the food available to an ecosystem may introduce instability, and may even lead to extinction.
