= Huffaker's mite experiment =

In 1958, Carl B. Huffaker, an ecologist and agricultural entomologist at the University of California, Berkeley, did a series of experiments with predatory and herbivorous mite species to investigate predator–prey population dynamics. In these experiments, he created model universes with arrays of rubber balls and oranges (food for the herbivorous mites) on trays and then introduced the predator and prey mite species in various permutations. Specifically, Huffaker was seeking to understand how spatial heterogeneity and the varying dispersal ability of each species affected long-term population dynamics and survival. Contrary to previous experiments on this topic (especially those by Georgii Gause), he found that long-term coexistence was possible under select environmental conditions. He published his findings in the paper, "Experimental Studies on Predation: Dispersion Factors and Predator–Prey Oscillations".

== Experimental design ==
The aim of Huffaker’s 1958 experiment was to “shed light upon the fundamental nature of predator–prey interaction” and to “establish an ecosystem in which a predatory and a prey species could continue living together so that the phenomena associated with their interactions could be studied in detail”. He used two mite species, the six-spotted mite Eotetranychus sexmaculatus as the prey species and Typhlodromus occidentalis as the predatory species. Oranges provided a background environment and a food source for the herbivorous mites. The amount of available food on each orange was controlled by sealing off portions of each orange using damp paper and paraffin wax. Huffaker introduced patchiness into the system by replacing oranges with rubber balls of a similar size. He referred to the resultant systems as "universes." Huffaker created a series of 12 universes in his experiment, trying different arrangements to reach a universe in which the predator population would not annihilate the prey population, and in which, instead, the two species could coexist.

=== Part 1: Control universes (No predators present) ===
Huffaker set up three different "universes" to examine the effect of patchiness on the prey species' population dynamics. 20 prey species mites were initially placed on one orange; their population was observed and recorded over several weeks. Huffaker noted that one source of error was the difference in nutritional value between oranges. Oranges were replaced every 11 days. The mites had the chance to deplete the nutritional value of the oranges completely before replacement. Temperature and humidity were kept constant at 83 °F (28 °C) and above 55%.

Universe A: 4 half exposed oranges clumped together.

Universe B: 4 half exposed oranges spread between 36 orange balls.

Universe C: 20 oranges with 1/10 exposed alternated with 20 rubber balls.

Huffaker found that mites migrated to new oranges only when the original orange habitat and food source had been depleted or overpopulated. Each universe produced a fluctuating mite population due to complete exploitation of orange resources leading to population spikes followed by rapid declines. Universe B had more stable oscillations, but a lower average population. Huffaker attributed this to the combination of dispersal difficulty and food supply; the other two universes only dealt with food supply because the food sources were so close together that dispersal did not play a major role in population dynamics.

=== Part II: Universes with prey and predator species ===
Huffaker created nine different universes to examine the effect of predator–prey interaction and spatial heterogeneity on populations of predator and prey species. Prey species were always added several days before predator species were added. Predator species were placed on oranges colonized by prey species. Additionally, Huffaker spread petroleum jelly on the trays between the oranges and rubber balls to serve as an "impediment but not an exclusion to movement" of the mites, creating heterogeneity. These universes fell into three groups.

==== Group 1: Clumped food source spacing ====
In this group the orange food sources were close together, requiring very little migration effort by either prey or predator species. Changes between the universes were only in amount of food available for the prey species. The effect of food source abundance on population dynamics was tested here.

Universe A: 4 half exposed oranges close together, the same as universe A of part 1.

Universe B: (increased food source) 8 half exposed oranges grouped together and joined by wires. 40 mites were released initially, 20 mites on 2 oranges.

Universe C: (increased food source again) 6 wholly exposed oranges grouped together. Prey introduced on 2 of the oranges. Predators introduced on only one orange.

==== Group 2: Interrupted food source spacing ====
In this group the food sources were not continuous, but were dispersed among rubber balls. This added an element of difficulty for dispersal of prey and predator species. The effects of spatial heterogeneity and mites species' searching ability on predator and prey population dynamics were tested here.

Universe D: (food source dispersal introduced) 4 half exposed oranges dispersed randomly among 36 rubber balls. (difficulty reaching other oranges)

Universe E: (increase food source) 8 half exposed oranges dispersed among 32 rubber balls.

Universe F: 20 oranges with 1/10 exposed alternated with 20 rubber balls

==== Group 3: Dispersal aids and impediments ====
In this group the food source was continuous, but much less of each orange was exposed (only 1/20) and petroleum jelly was placed between regions to make dispersal of prey and predator species more difficult. The petroleum jelly did not exclude the predator species, but did make access to the prey species more difficult. The third universe also included a dispersal method for the prey species, wooden posts on the oranges to facilitate movement. This group tested the effect of dispersal ability on predator–prey population dynamics.

Universe G: 40 oranges with 1/20 of each orange exposed. No rubber balls making every site a food source. A petroleum jelly barrier dividing the tray of oranges into three areas.

Universe H: 120 oranges with 1/20 of each orange exposed. No rubber balls.

Universe I: 120 oranges with 1/20 of each orange exposed. No rubber balls. 120 prey species mites were places on 120 oranges to start, one mite on each orange. In this set-up small wooden posts, similar to toothpicks, were placed in each major section of the universe. An electric fan was turned on near the trays so that the prey mite species, which has the ability to drop using silk strands and to be carried by air currents, was able to disperse more easily than the predator species, which does not have these capabilities.

Population dynamics of Universe 3: 3 population level oscillations for both predator and prey species. This was the result that Huffaker was aiming for; all other universes yielded just one population density peak followed by extinction of the predator species in all cases, and extinction, or near extinction of the prey species.

=== Results ===
All of the universes except for universe 3 had just one population oscillation for both the predator and prey species, and in most cases both species became extinct after the initial peak and decline. Extinction would occur after the predator species had completely exploited the prey species and then lacking a food source, would starve to death itself. In contrast, Universe 3 had three population peaks.

Huffaker wrote: “utilizing a large and more complex environment so as to make less likely the predators’ contact with the prey at all positions at once, or essentially so, it was possible to produce three waves or oscillations in density of predators and prey. That these waves represent a direct and reciprocal predator-prey dependence is obvious.”

== Underlying theory ==
=== Predator–prey interactions ===
Central to Huffaker’s investigations is the concept of predator–prey interactions. In general, predation is believed to reduce prey populations. However, there are notable exceptions to this rule. For example, some plants have been shown to increase growth rates in response to herbivory.

The Lotka–Volterra predator–prey model describes the basic population dynamics under predation. The solution to these equations in the simple one-predator species, one-prey species model is a stable linked oscillation of population levels for both predator and prey. However, when time lags between respective population growths are modeled, these oscillations will tend to amplify, eventually leading to extinction of both species. The Ricker model exemplifies this dynamic.

The Russian ecologist Georgii Gause demonstrated the tendency toward extinction among predator–prey populations with a series of experiments in 1934. He found that in experiments with Didinium nasutum (predator) and Paramecium caudatum (prey), D. nausatum overexploited P. caudatum leading first to its extinction and subsequently to its own.

In his 1958 experiment, Huffaker was probing further into Gause’s conclusion about overexploitation. Specifically, he was examining how environmental factors (grouping, patchiness, ease of motion) could affect the population dynamics to the point of achieving coexistence over multiple cycles. Some of the main questions that Huffaker set out in his experiment were, “Is the predator–prey relation adequately described by the Gause theory of overexploitation?”, “What may be the effects of changes in the physical conditions upon the degree of stability or permanence of the predator–prey relation?” and “What is the order of influence on stability of population density of such parameters as shelter (from physical adversity of environment), food, disease, and natural enemies of other kinds?” In short, these questions seek to understand the effect of spatial heterogeneity on the population system.

=== Spatial heterogeneity ===
Spatial heterogeneity is the variation of an environment over space (e.g. differences between oranges and balls). Huffaker was expanding upon Gause's experiments by further introducing heterogeneity. Gause's experiments had found that predator and prey populations would become extinct regardless of initial population size. However, Gause also concluded that a predator–prey community could be self-sustaining if there were refuges for the prey population.

Through his experiments, Huffaker attempted to show that refuges were not necessary for maintenance of prey populations. He believed instead that spatial heterogeneity and its differing effects on the species' dispersal ability could create a moving refuge for the prey population. Indeed, by creating a patchy system that facilitated prey dispersal over predator dispersal, Huffaker was able to achieve a predator–prey system which underwent three cycles of population fluctuation.

To prevent extinction of the mites, Huffaker introduced spatial heterogeneity in several ways. Like Gause, he manipulated dispersal within the system. The addition of petroleum jelly barriers and toothpicks added heterogeneity in the landscape and allowed the prey mites to disperse more readily than the predator mites. Also by patchily distributing the oranges, Huffaker created a system of sub-populations aggregating into a more stable meta-population. These two manipulations of spatial heterogeneity allowed for natural fluctuations and “extinctions” of populations to occur locally without causing extinctions in the overall meta-population.

== Conclusions and relevance ==
Huffaker’s experimental universes showed that while under many circumstances predator–prey interactions will lead to extinction of both populations, interactions of spatial heterogeneity, dispersal ability of predator and prey species, and distribution of food sources can create an environment in which predator and prey species can coexist. The distribution of one prey species placed on each of 120 oranges, the impediments to predator movement created by the petroleum jelly divisions between sections of oranges, and the dispersal aid of wooden sticks for the prey species, all worked together to create a spatially heterogeneous environment in which both the predator and prey species survived for three population cycles. Huffaker ultimately concluded that, with added spatial heterogeneity, these mite populations could have continued to oscillate beyond three cycles. Looking forward, Huffaker noted the importance of understanding these concepts with respect to understanding the impact of monocultures (i.e. low spatial heterogeneity) in industrial agriculture on biodiversity.
