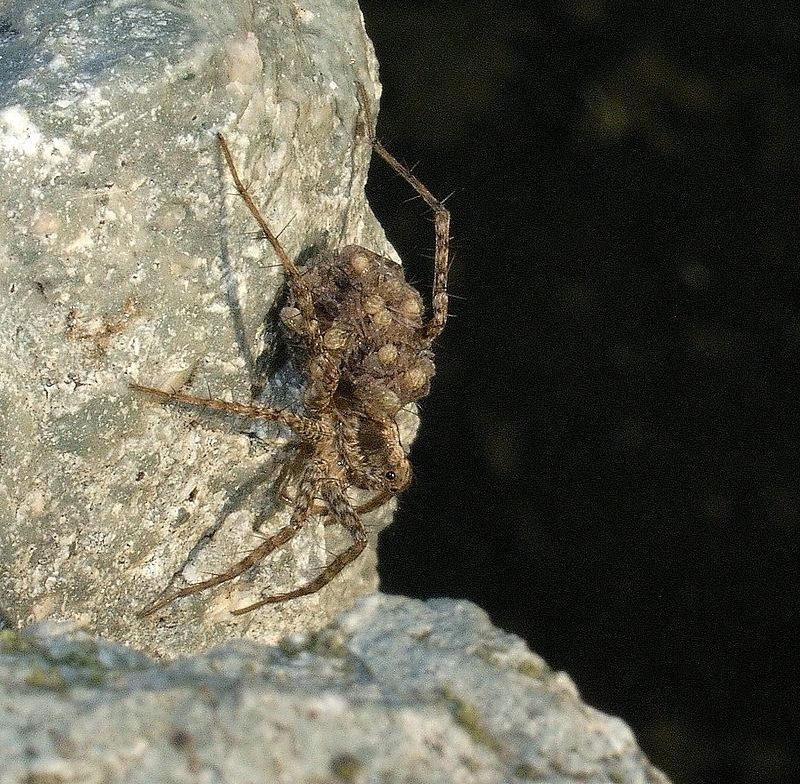

Scientific classification
- Kingdom: Animalia
- Phylum: Arthropoda
- Subphylum: Chelicerata
- Class: Arachnida
- Order: Araneae
- Infraorder: Araneomorphae
- Family: Lycosidae
- Genus: Pardosa
- Species: P. pseudoannulata

Binomial name
- Pardosa pseudoannulata (Bösenberg & Strand, 1906)

= Pardosa pseudoannulata =

Species of arachnid

Pardosa pseudoannulata, a member of a group of species referred to as wolf-spiders, is a non-web-building spider belonging to the family Lycosidae. P. pseudoannulata are wandering spiders that track and ambush prey and display sexual cannibalism. They are commonly encountered in farmlands across China and other East Asian countries. Their venom has properties that helps it function as an effective insecticide, and it is, therefore, a crucial pesticide control agent.

== Description ==
Pardosa pseudoannulata exhibits significant sexual dimorphism in terms of size. Females are, on average, 1.3 times larger than the males. This spider can be recognized by the ring markings on its legs and the dark bands on its carapace. The underside of these spiders is characterized by six black dots. Female P. pseudoannulata are easy to detect, as most will have an egg sac attached to their spinnerets. P. pseudoannulata have three rows of eyes with the front row having four eyes and the other rows having two eyes each.

== Habitat and distribution ==
=== Distribution ===
Pardosa pseudoannulata is widely spread across China, India, Korea, Japan and other countries in East Asia. It is most commonly found in farm fields throughout China. These spiders are commonly seen in rice fields and are the dominant predator.

=== Habitat ===
Pardosa pseudoannulata commonly inhabits arable farm fields and similar open habitats. It is one of the most common surface-dwelling spider species in Central China and plays an important role as a control agent against pests and insects within the crop fields. The spider is also found near fields with ponds and has the ability to move swiftly over bodies of water. Due to the nature of agriculture, the fields will remain fallow for several months, decreasing the density of prey that migrate into the field to take advantage of nutrients in the crops. This causes P. pseudoannulata to starve for multiple months at times, explaining why they are well adapted to survive in environments with insufficient resources.

In order to produce the maximum number of eggs and the highest rate of successful hatchings, Pardosa pseudoannulata prefers temperatures between 20 and 30 °C, the optimal temperature being 25 °C. If the temperature is lower than 10 °C, the spiders will stop eating and, as a result, will not grow or develop. In temperatures above 40 °C, the spiders will move slowly and remain hidden in burrows.

== Diet ==
Pardosa pseudoannulata commonly starve and have a hard time foraging for sufficient nutrients. Therefore, the occurrence of sexual cannibalism provides an adaptive strategy for female survival as well as reproductive benefits. Pre-copulation cannibalism in which the male spider is used solely as food is commonly observed in females who have already mated. The consumption of conspecifics makes up a quarter of the female's diet. Male spiders are an especially good source of nutrition because of their large size (females are 1.3 times larger) when compared to natural prey, which are insects that are several times smaller than the females.

The natural prey of Pardosa pseudoannulata are rice field pests, with the rice brown planthopper, Nilaparvata lugens, as the most common. N. lugens are abundant in rice fields and detrimental to the growth of rice plants. Pardosa pseudoannulata prefers the rice brown planthopper over other pests, with the planthopper making up around 30% percent of an average spider's diet.

=== Abdomen size ===
Pardosa pseudoannulata’s abdomen width is an important indicator of its hunting abilities and starvation resistance. There is a trade-off between the hunting abilities and the period of time the spider can withstand hunger. Spiders with larger abdomens are seen to withstand starvation for longer periods of time, whereas spiders with smaller abdomens are seen to be better and more agile hunters.

=== Seasonal Changes in Resource Allocation ===
Pardosa pseudoannulata's body mainly consists of the cephalothorax and abdomen. The sizes of these body regions strongly correlate with the energy the spider will have to hunt and the duration of time it can withstand starvation. While the size of the cephalothorax correlates strongly with hunting ability, the size of the abdomen correlates with starvation resistance. If a spiderling is in a situation where the mother deems it important for it to hunt, her resource allocation will work to increase the development of the cephalothorax. On the other hand, if there is a period of starvation expected by the mother, she will allocate resources that lead to the enlargement of the abdomen. The size of the abdomen correlates with the quantity of stored energy that can get the spider through a period of hunger. This is especially useful for spiders developing in late Autumn, as they will need the extra abdomen size to survive through overwintering, where spiders hunt at significantly lower frequencies. As result, spiderlings that emerge in November have a larger cephalothorax and abdomen, when compared to spiders that emerge in June. Also, the abdomen-cephalothorax size ratio is significantly greater for spiderlings that emerge in November than in June. Pardosa pseudoannulata varies the quantity of resources invested in the cephalothorax and abdomen and the proportional allocation of resources between the body parts depending on the season. This unique property of the spider helps it improve its overwintering survival rates.

== Reproduction ==
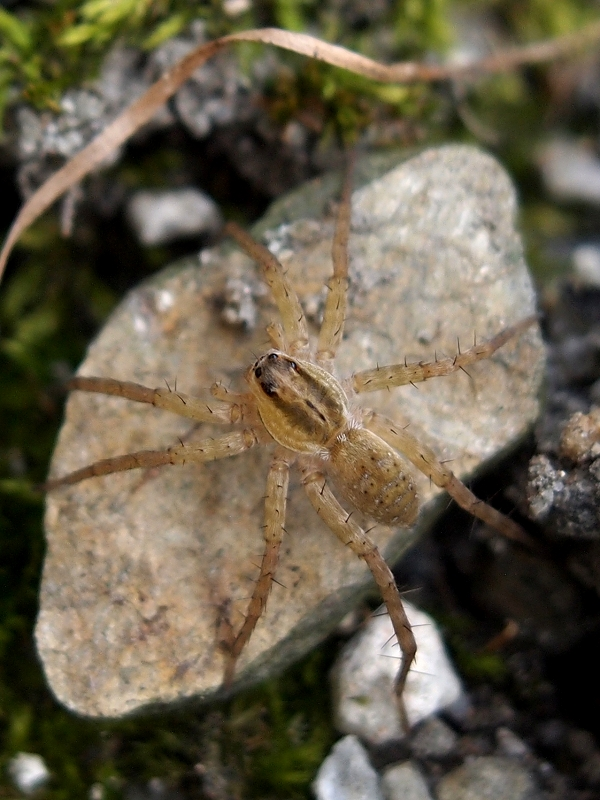
Pardosa pseudoannulata seen from above.

Pardosa pseudoannulata males and females differ in terms of sexual behavior. Females are monandrous, meaning that they only mate with one male at a time. This motivates the evolution of sexual cannibalism for males, as the male will parent all of the female's offspring, making the paternal investment worthwhile. On the other hand, males are polygynous if not cannibalized.

Females are able to store sperm from a copulation and use it produce multiple egg sacs. This prevents them from being motivated to mate again. The result is higher aggression rates in female spiders who have previously mated.

Females will carry their sac filled with eggs connected to their spinnerets. This will detach when it is time for the offspring to be born. The new offspring will crawl onto the mother's abdomen and stay there for 5 days. During this time, they will feed off of the remains of their yolk from the mother's eggs. After this period, they will move into the leaf litter and detach live from the mother.

Copulation duration for Pardosa pseudoannulata ranges from 19 to 93 minutes. The duration of copulation is significantly higher with males that are cannibalized. Copulation duration is independent of the sperm count of the male. Male spiders will need up to seven days in order to replenish their sperm count. For females, reproducing with a male that has recently mated and has a low sperm count will lead to a lower chance of reproductive success. The sperm count of the male has no impact on copulation duration or intensity, so it is believed that females are unable to distinguish males with high sperm counts from males with low sperm counts.

== Life cycle ==
Pardosa pseudoannulata will have on average two and a half generations per year. Similar to other Pardosa species, sub-adults and adults overwinter in order to conserve energy and survive the cold winter months. Overwintering adults will be inactive from November to March as they save up body mass. They will burrow into the soil or use litter in their natural habitat as shelter. They will reach their reproductive peak in early May, and this peak is usually consists of the overwintering generation. A second reproductive peak is observed in early July with the second generation. A third one can be seen in late September with the following generation.

== Behavior ==
=== Sexual cannibalism ===
Pardosa pseudoannulata engages in sexual cannibalism as a foraging strategy. Conspecific prey can make up 25% of the female's diet. The female spider uses sexual cannibalism as a way to attain nutrition and increase offspring survival. There are instances where the female spider will attack and cannibalize the male before or after copulation, the latter being observed more frequently. The rate at which females attack males is dependent on the female's hunger level and mating history. Spiders that are well-fed and virgins are less likely to attack males and perform pre-copulative cannibalism. The reason why starved females are more aggressive is because they have more motivation to acquire nutrition. Interestingly, the rate of cannibalization occurring did not change with the female's sexual history or hunger state. Aside from this, male size is also a significant factor in cannibalization rates. As mate size dimorphism, the difference between the sizes of mates, increases, sexual cannibalism occurs more frequently.

Sexual cannibalism increases offspring survival in Pardosa pseudoannulata. This is mainly due to the mother's ability to care for offspring as a result of nutrition derived through cannibalism. The presence of sexual cannibalism does not have any influence on fecundity, as cannibalistic and non-cannibalistic females produce the same amount of offspring. Another benefit of sexual cannibalism to the female is the increase in body mass through the nutrients in the male body.

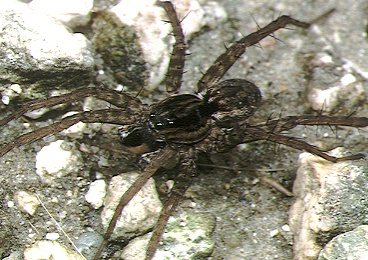
Male Pardosa pseudoannulata

=== Male benefit in sexual cannibalism ===
From the male spider's perspective, sexual cannibalism proves beneficial as well, given that cannibalism occurs after copulation. Each copulatory approach is a risk taken by the male, as there is always a chance that the female might cannibalize the male pre-copulation. In this scenario, the male loses all of its future opportunities to reproduce. Additionally, being cannibalized before copulation increases the survival rates of rival males’ offspring. On the other hand, if copulation is successful, the male benefits. The male gets an opportunity to propagate his genes through his offspring by sacrificing his body in the form of paternal investment. As the females are monandrous, the male is guaranteed to father all offspring produced by the female.

=== Courting behavior ===
Pardosa pseudoannulata males display unique courting behavior. This display includes pounding the floor with the first pair of legs. This courting behavior is sustained until the female acts on the male. If the male senses a lunge, or an aggressive behavior from the female, it will attempt to escape. Most males are able to avoid cannibalism through escaping the female. However, if the lunge of the female is successful and the male is caught, the female almost always cannibalizes the male.

== Prey Capture ==
Pardosa pseudoannulata do not weave webs, but instead will ambush, or chase, their prey in order to capture them. Genomic inspection has shown that they are significantly lacking in genes responsible for silk web production when compared to the genes for neurotoxic venom production.Pardosa pseudoannulata uses an immobilizing venom rather than a web. Its venom has been effective against numerous pests that infest arable crop fields. Because of this, there is a lot of research that focuses on using the venom of Pardosa pseudoannulata as a pesticide in order to maximize crop yields in rice farms. The studied venom is shown to be very selective in its target and will only immobilize certain species that Pardosa pseudoannulata comes in contact with. P. pseudoannulata venom is generally harmless to humans, although it can cause rashes or minor allergic reactions.
