= UAV-IQ =

Award-winning ag-tech company

- Company type: Private
- Industry: Agriculture
- Founded: 2015; 11 years ago in Los Angeles, CA, USA
- Headquarters: USA
- Key people: Andreas Neuman (CEO)
- Services: Aerial biological pest control
- Website: uaviq.com

UAV-IQ, an abbreviation for Unmanned Aerial Vehicle Intelligence, is an agricultural technology and services company specializing in farm management services through drone operations. Founded in 2015, UAV-IQ has gained recognition for its innovative approaches to integrated pest management (IPM).

It pioneered aerial biological pest control (biocontrol) services via drones equipped with specialized systems developed to release beneficial bugs over crops. These beneficial insects and mites are the natural enemies of the pests which damage crops, and can be predators or parasitoids.

== Biological Pest Management ==
Many species of predators and parasitoids are commercially reared and approved by federal and state agencies for release in farms, vineyards, nurseries, and orchards. Several of these species can be released by drones using UAV-IQ's specialized release systems, often in multiple life stages, most commonly as eggs, larvae/juveniles, and/or adults. In addition to these life stages, certain parasitoids are released in their mummified stage, a process in which the parasitoid larvae develop within the body of the host pest, eventually killing it and emerging as mature adults from the host's remains after they are released into the field.

== Notable Achievements ==
- In 2023, UAV-IQ received the Integrated Pest Management (IPM) Achievement Award from the California Department of Pesticide Regulation (CDPR). This award recognized UAV-IQ's innovative use of drone technology for biocontrol, highlighting its significant contributions to IPM within the agricultural industry.
- UAV-IQ was featured prominently in the 2023 UCLA Innovation Showcase, highlighting its role as an emerging leader in agricultural technology.
- UAV-IQ emerged as a top-10 finisher in the American Farm Bureau Federation's annual competition, "The Farm Bureau Ag Innovation Challenge," in 2024.
- The company won the "Food+ City Challenge" at South By Southwest (SXSW) in 2018 by showcasing its novel solutions in food and agriculture technology.

== Founding and Development ==
UAV-IQ originated from the Venture Initiation specialization within the UCLA Anderson School of Management's Executive MBA Program. Additionally, UAV-IQ has participated in several competitive accelerators, including Parallel 18, THRIVE AgTech, MassChallenge, and the UCLA Anderson Venture Accelerator

== Grant-Funded Research ==
Conducted in collaboration between UAV-IQ and a research team from Washington State University led by Dr. David James, a study investigated the efficacy of UAV-IQ's drone technology for releasing two beneficial insects obtained from a commercial insectary into Washington wine grape vineyards. The insects included Cryptolaemus beetles, commonly known as mealybug destroyer, and the predatory mite Neoseiulus californicus. Drone releases of both species occurred in mid-June and mid-August. The project, funded by a grant from the Washington State Wine Commission titled 'Using Drones and an Attractant to Improve Biological Control of Mealybugs and Spider Mites in WA Wine Grapes', demonstrated promising potential for drones in integrated pest management within vineyards.

In a continued focus on biological pest control in vineyards, UAV-IQ received another grant from the California Department of Food and Agriculture (CDFA) titled 'Drone-Based Biological Control of the Vine Mealybug in California Vineyards'. This research, initiated in 2023 and expected to conclude in 2025, aims to address the challenges of managing vine mealybug (VMB) through the release of predators and parasitoids as a biological control method. According to the grant's abstract, the project leverages UAV-IQ's operational and technological capabilities to deploy drones equipped with intelligent release systems directly over crops, facilitating the targeted release of beneficial insects and mites. The research focuses on evaluating the effectiveness of predators Cryptolaemus montrouzieri and parasitoids Anagyrus pseudococci released by drones to manage vine mealybug populations, with the overarching goal of refining economically viable treatment protocols.
