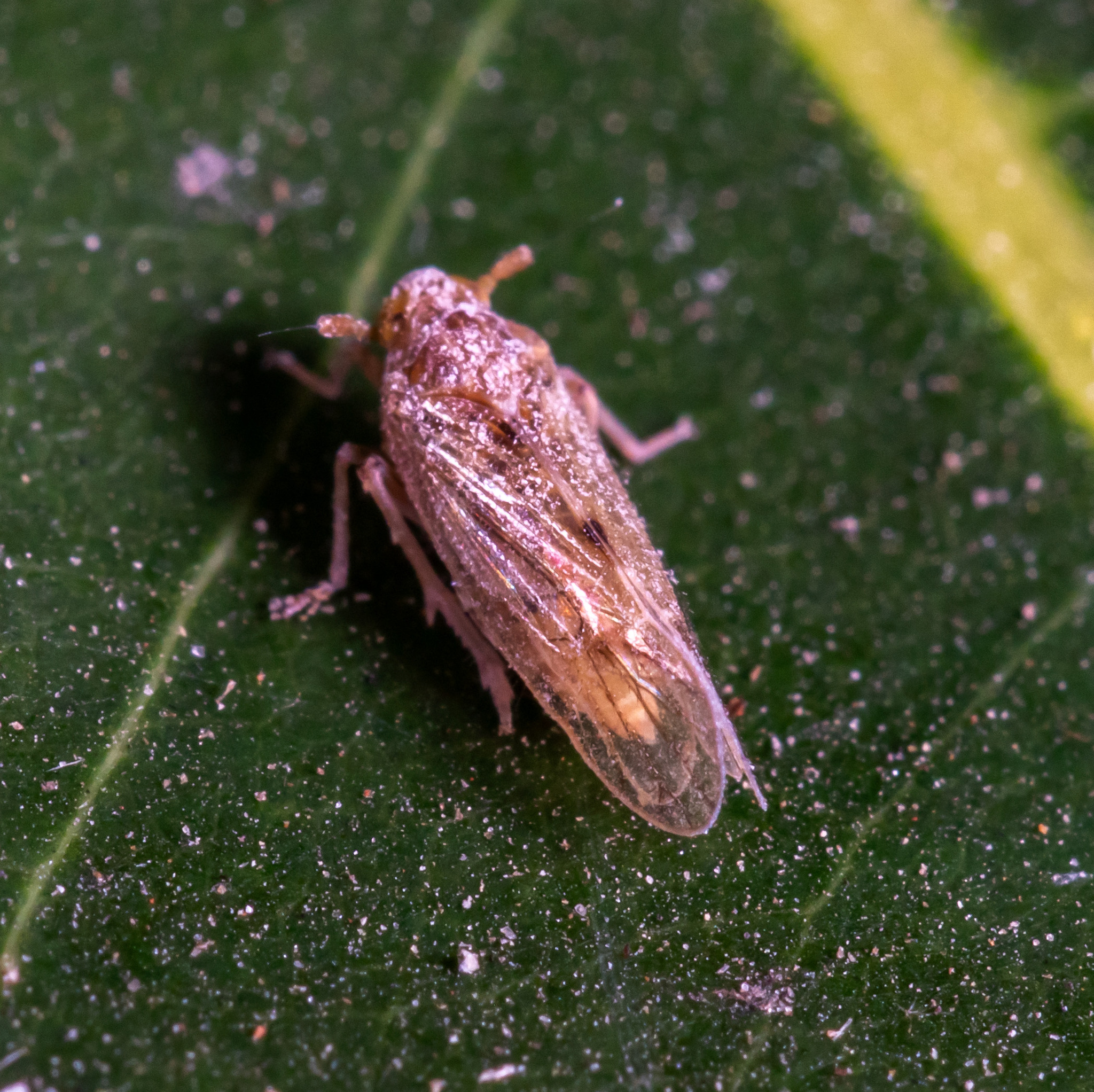
- N. lugens from India
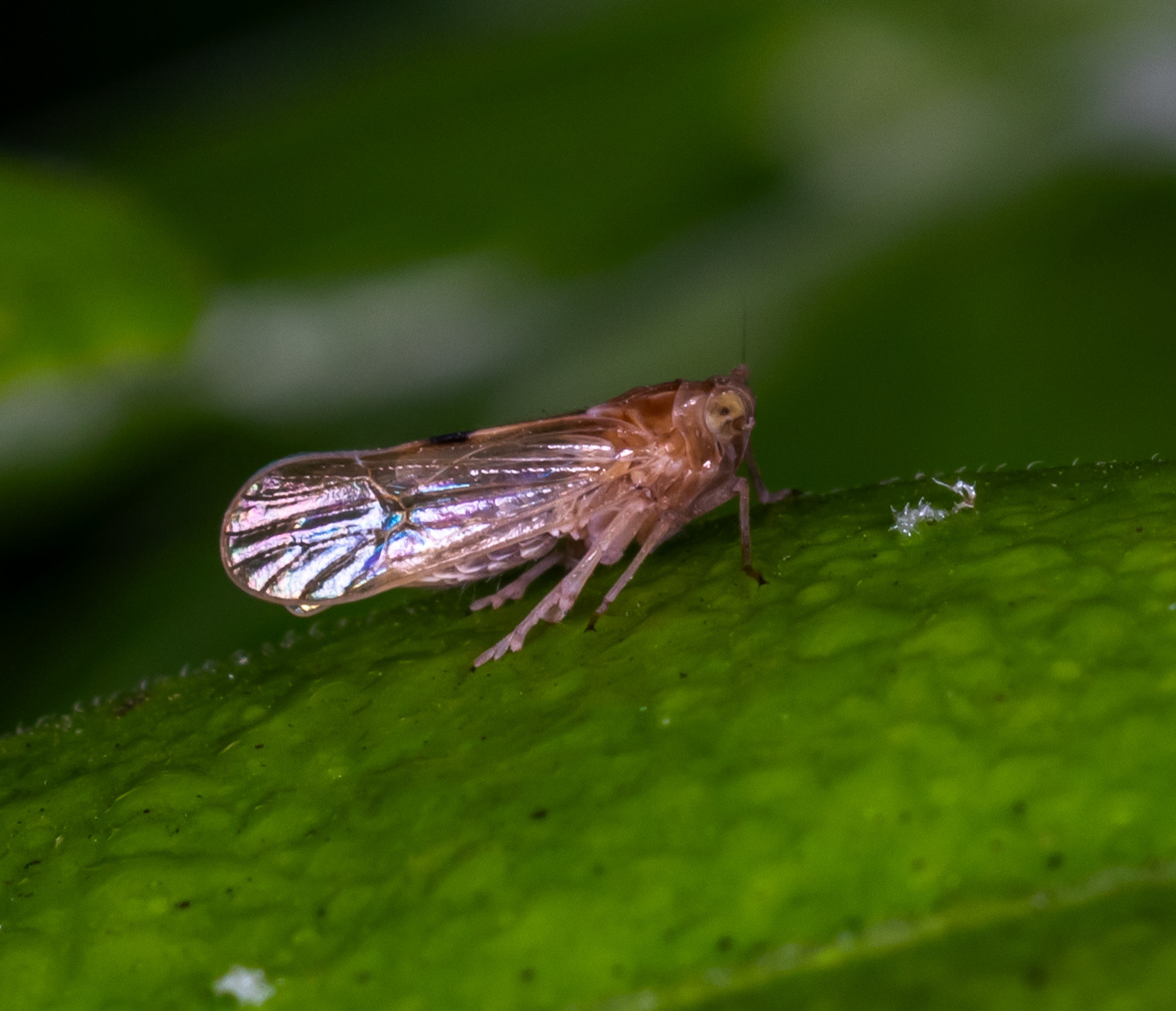

Scientific classification
- Kingdom: Animalia
- Phylum: Arthropoda
- Clade: Pancrustacea
- Class: Insecta
- Order: Hemiptera
- Suborder: Auchenorrhyncha
- Infraorder: Fulgoromorpha
- Family: Delphacidae
- Subfamily: Delphacinae
- Tribe: Delphacini
- Genus: Nilaparvata
- Species: N. lugens

Binomial name
- Nilaparvata lugens (Stål, 1854)

= Brown planthopper =

Species of planthopper

The brown planthopper (BPH), Nilaparvata lugens (Stål) (Hemiptera: Delphacidae) is a planthopper species that feeds on rice plants (Oryza sativa L.). These insects are among the most important pests of rice, which is the major staple crop for about half the world's population. They damage rice directly through feeding and also by transmitting two viruses, rice ragged stunt virus and rice grassy stunt virus. Up to 60% yield loss is common in susceptible rice cultivars attacked by the insect.

The BPH is distributed throughout Australia, Bangladesh, Bhutan, Burma (Myanmar), Cambodia, China, Fiji, India, Indonesia, Japan, North and South Korea, Laos, Malaysia, India, Nepal, Pakistan, Papua New Guinea, Philippines, Sri Lanka, Taiwan, Thailand, and Vietnam.

Their alternative host plant other than rice is Leersia hexandra.

== Biology ==
Long-winged form

Short-winged form

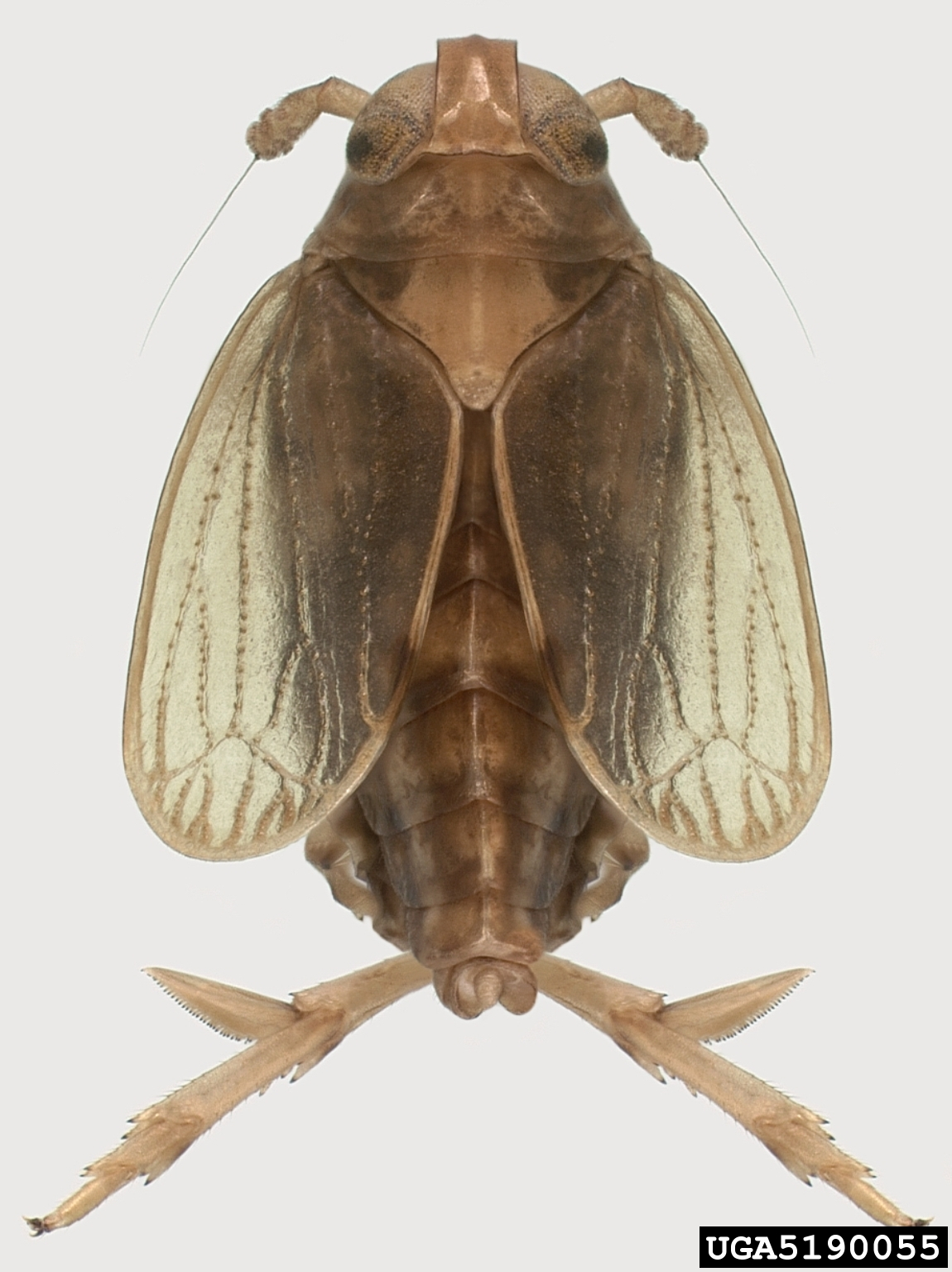
Lab photo

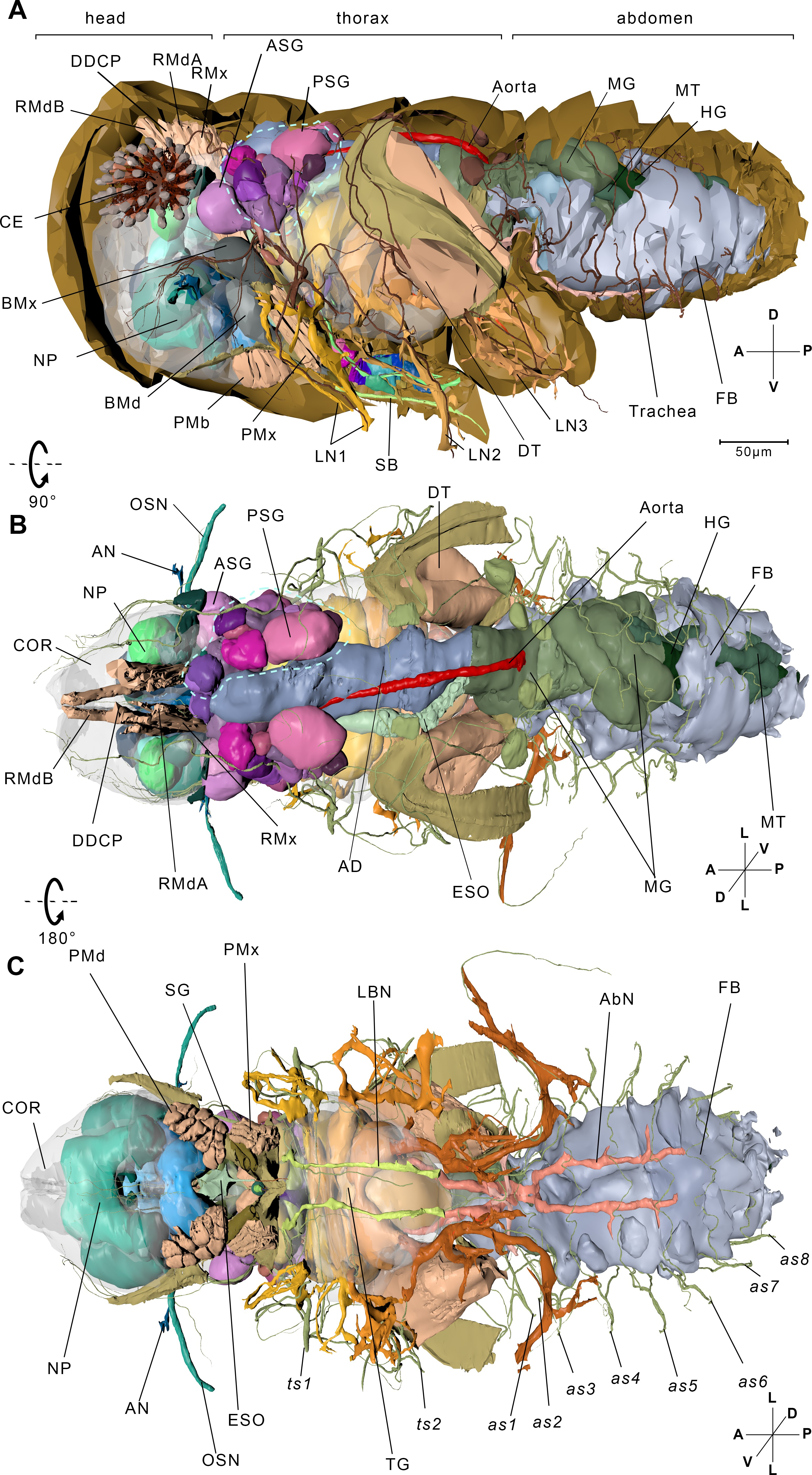
Internal structures of nymph

The brown planthopper is dimorphic, with fully winged 'macropterous' and truncate-winged 'brachypterous' forms. The macropterous forms are potentially migrants and are responsible for colonizing new fields. They migrate on the wind, with East Asian populations undergoing closed circuit journeys between Indochina and the Far East. Malay Archipelago and South Asia populations, on the other hand, make one-way migrations to Indochina.

After settling on rice plants, they produce the next generation, where most of the female insects develop as brachypters and males as macropters. Adults usually mate on the day of emergence, and the females start laying eggs from the day following mating. Brachypterous females lay 300 to 350 eggs, whereas macropterous females lay fewer eggs. The eggs are thrust in a straight line generally along the mid-region of the leaf sheath. Eggs hatch in about six to nine days. The newly hatched nymphs are cottony white, and turn purple brown within an hour. They feed on plant sap. They pass through five instars before becoming adults.

== Damage ==
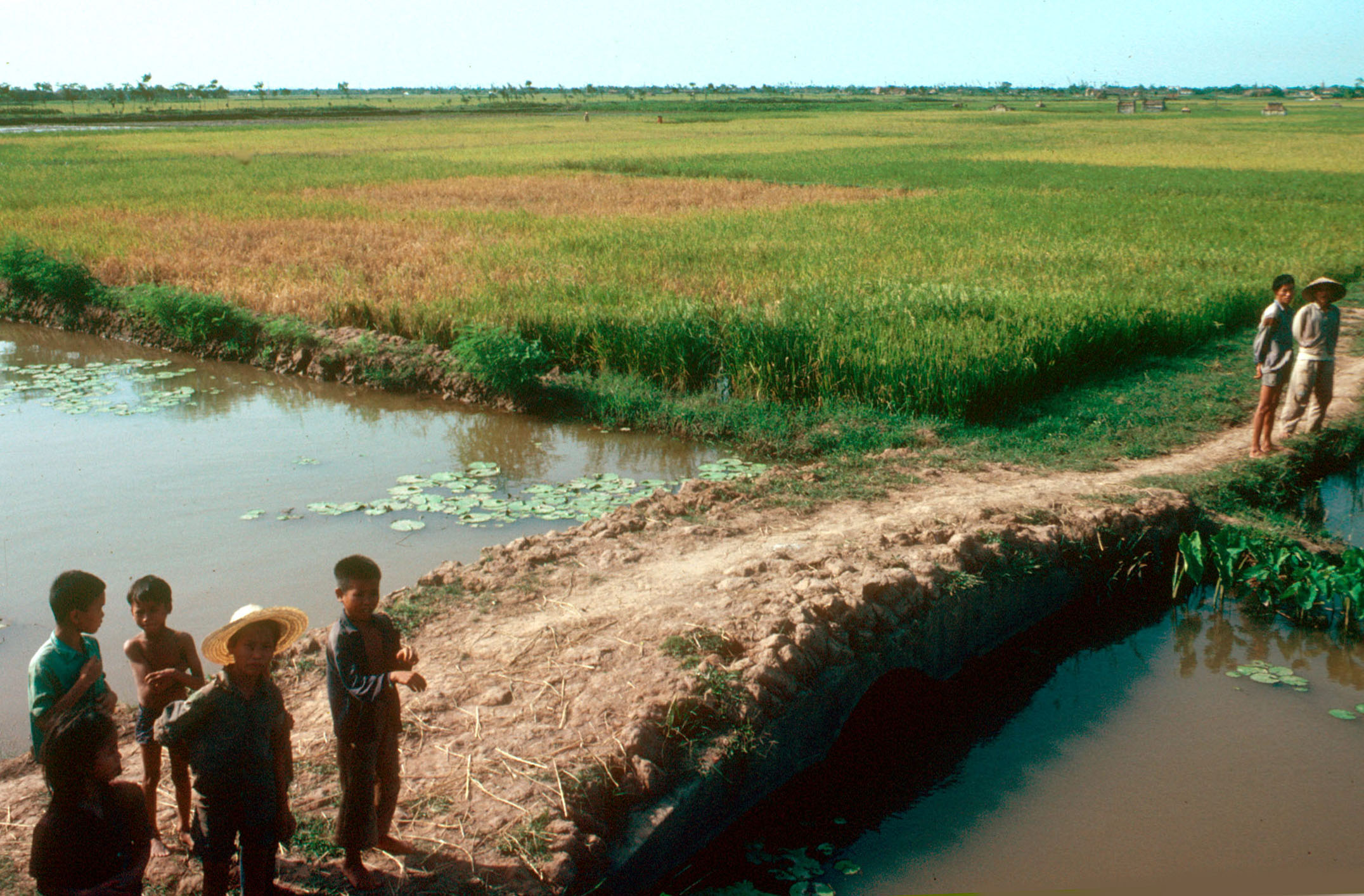
A typical hopper-burn of rice in Vietnam following intensification in the early 1980s

BPH infest the rice crop at all stages of plant growth. Due to feeding by both the nymphs and adults at the base of the tillers, plants turn yellow and dry up rapidly. During the early infestation stage, round yellow patches appear, which soon become brownish due to the drying up of the plants. This condition is called 'hopper burn'.

Temperature is a critical factor that affects the life activities of this insect. The hatchability and survival rate are the highest around 25 °C. The eggs are highly sensitive to desiccation and soon shrivel when the host plant starts wilting. BPH population growth is maximal in a temperature range from 28 to 30 °C.

== Predators ==
Video monitoring of various predators in the presence of dead or live (immobilized or not) brown planthoppers

Predators of this insect include the spiders Pardosa pseudoannulata and Araneus inustus. In some cases, BPHs lay eggs in the rice seed beds (also known as rice nurseries) shortly before transplanting, so enter the field in this manner.

Differential mortality of predators and hoppers does not appear to be the only factor for insecticide-induced resurgence. Some insecticides evidently increase the protein content of BPH male accessory glands, and thereby increase planthopper fecundity. Some insecticides increase the amount of amino acids and sucrose available in the phloem of rice plants, and thereby increase BPH survival.

== Management and control ==
Excessive use of broad-spectrum insecticides and nitrogenous fertilizer can lead to outbreaks by increasing the fecundity of the brown planthopper, and resugence of populations by reducing of natural enemies. It follows that the primary integrated pest management (IPM) approach includes restricting the inappropriate and excessive use of these inputs. For example in 2011, the Thai government announced an initiative to respond to a major brown planthoppers outbreak by restricting outbreak-causing insecticides including abamectin and cypermethrin; the decision was supported by the International Rice Research Institute (IRRI). IRRI also outlined recommendations foe an Integrated Pest Management (IPM) action plan to limit planthopper outbreaks. In December 2011, the IRRI held a conference in Vietnam to address the threats of insecticide misuse and explore options for mitigation.

Rice varieties with resistance to BPH are important for preventing outbreaks. A large IRRI rice breeding programme took place in the 1970s and early 80s culminating in IR64; a constraint was the evolution of BPH populations (biotypes) that were able to attack early varieties propagated as resistant (e.g. IR28 and IR36: see illustration). In areas with low insecticide use, high levels of BPH resistance are not usually necessary. Chemical mutagenesis can significantly increase or decrease BPH resistance levels of rice. Some chemical insecticides, e.g. imidacloprid, can affect the gene expression of rice and thereby increase susceptibility to BPH.

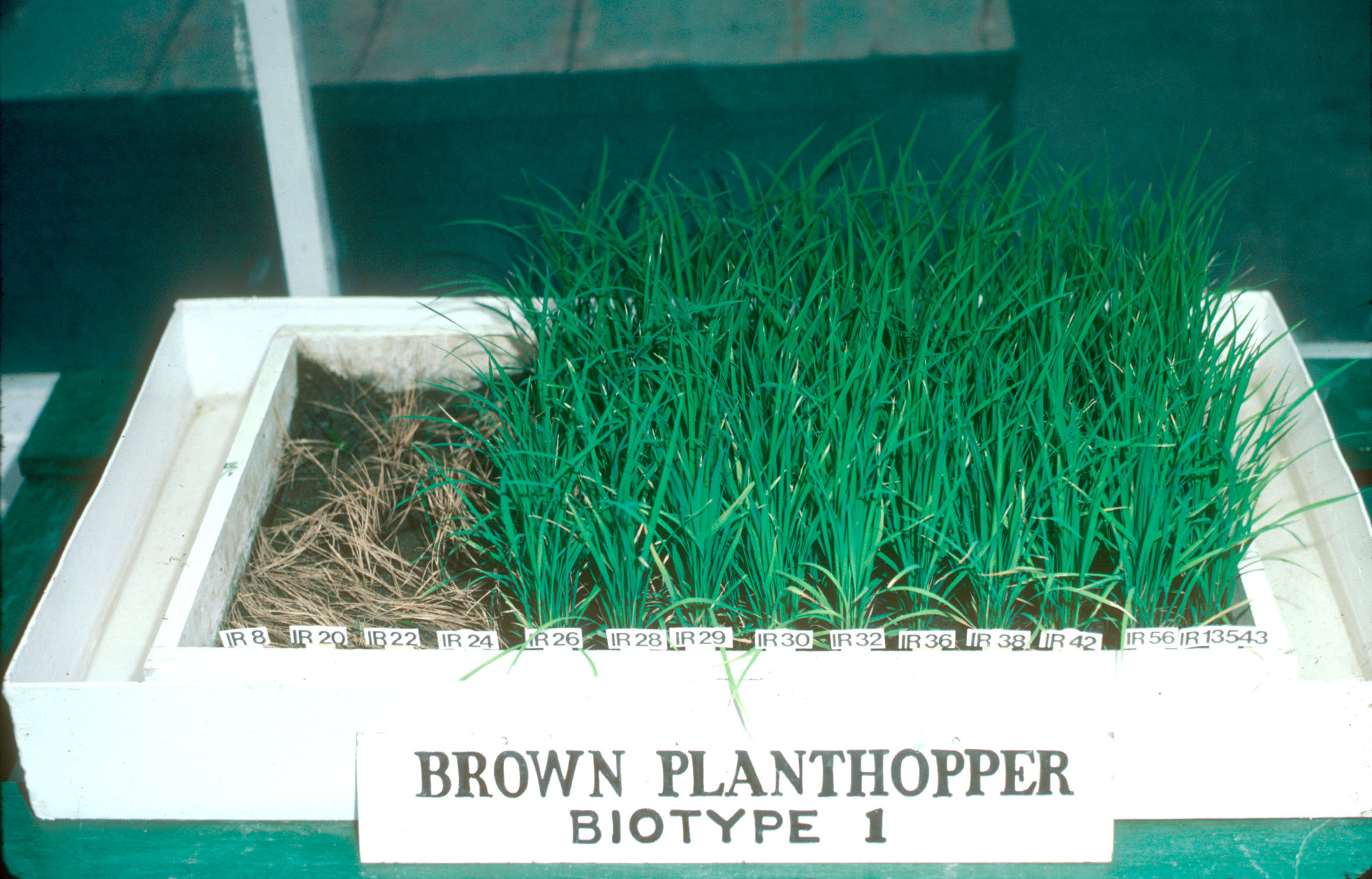
Early IRRI Rice variety

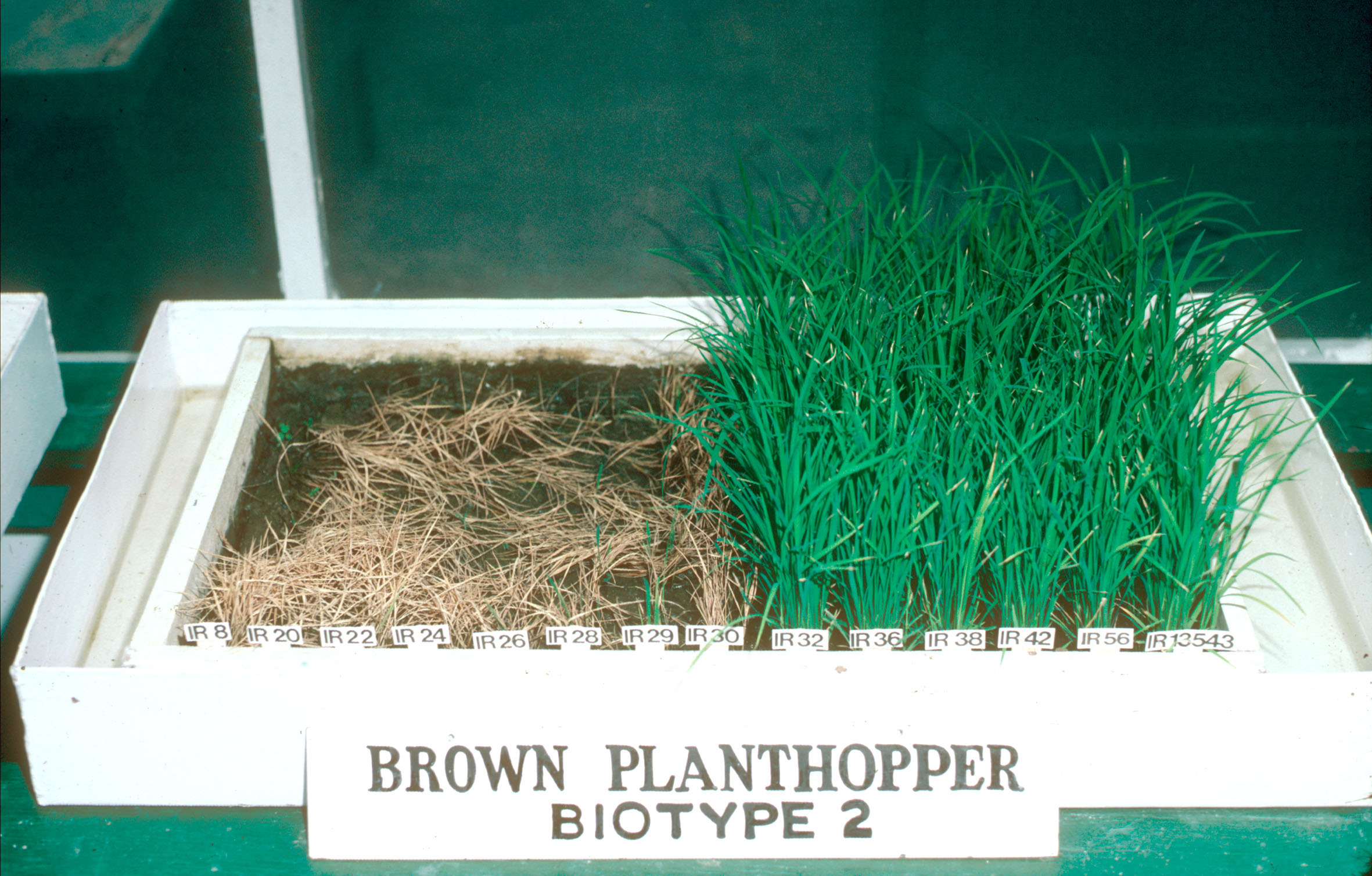
responses to three BPH

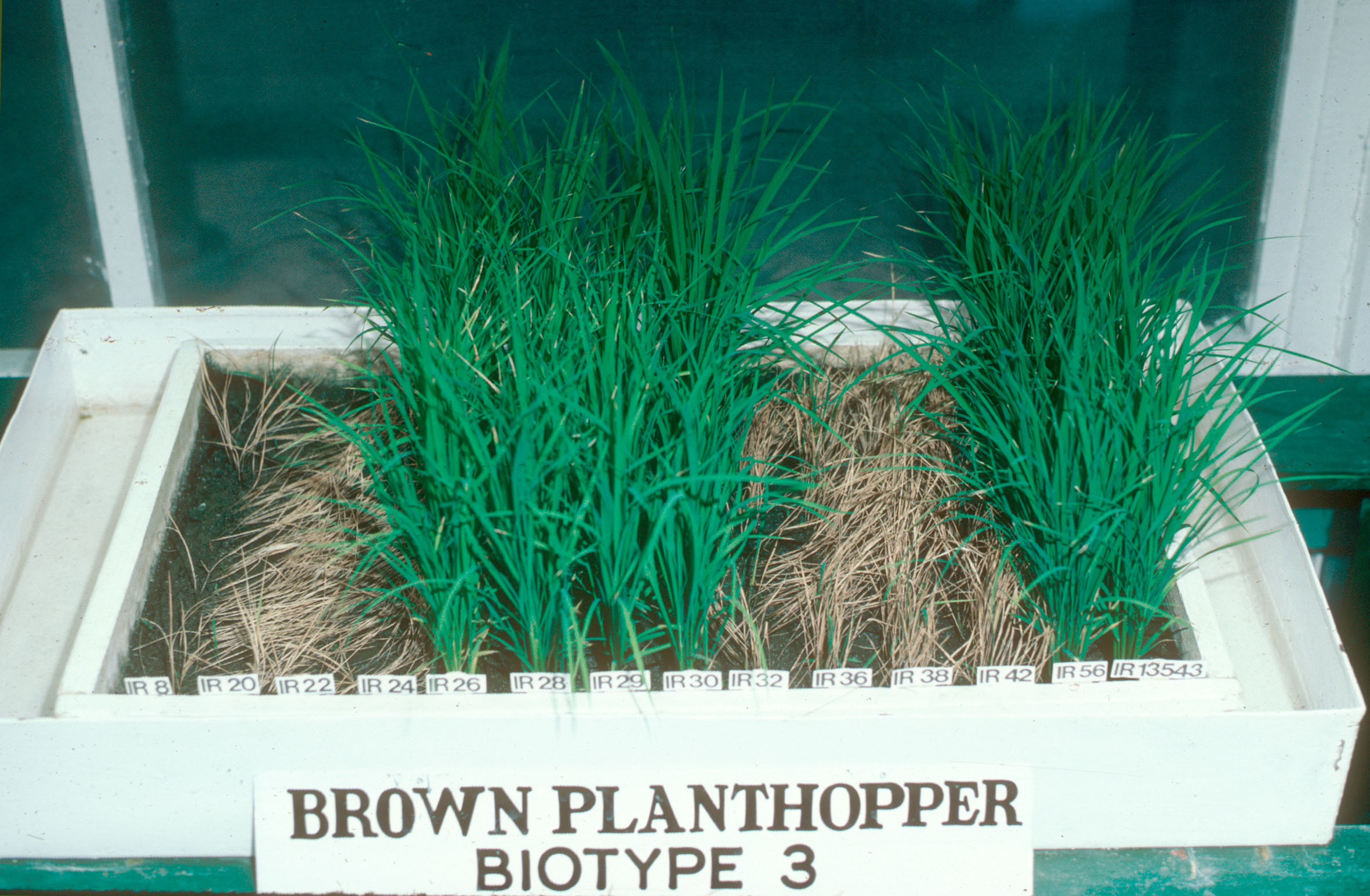
biotypes (taken in 1983)

In an attempt to make BPH control more species-specific, researchers are trying to develop methods of turning off specific BPH genes for digestion-, defense- and xenobiotic metabolism. Many novel genes for these functions have been detected in tissue from BPH intestines.

Some plant lectins are antifeedants to BPH and if properly formulated may have the potential to protect rice from BPH.

== Impact of climate change ==
Research indicates that BPH nymphs are already living at the upper limits of tolerable temperatures. This suggests that climate warming in tropical regions with occasional extremely high temperatures would limit the survival and distribution of BPH.
