= Abraham E. Michelbacher =

Abraham Ezra Michelbacher (April 12, 1899 – May 22, 1991) was an American entomologist who served as a professor of entomology at the University of California, Berkeley. He worked at the experimental research station in Riverside. He specialized in the study of the Symphyla and other Myriapoda. In the 1950s he helped to articulate the idea of "integrated control", a conceptual basis for integrated pest management.

Michelbacher was born in Riverside, California and grew up at Newport with an early interest in fishing which remained a recreation through his life. He went to study agronomy at the Citrus Experiment Station which would later become the Riverside Campus from 1920 and here he was introduced to biological control by Harry Smith. He received a BS in 1927, MS (1930) and finally a PhD in 1935. His graduate teachers included E.O. Essig. Michelbacher specialized in the systematics of Symphyla. He married bacteriologist Martha Meyer in 1927. He joined Berkeley as a laboratory assistant and became an assistant entomologist in 1943 and a full professor in 1956. His career research was largely on applied entomology dealing with the management of insects in agriculture, particularly in alfalfa cultivation. In 1939 he talked about discriminating use of insecticides at the 6th Pacific Science Congress. He also took an interest in the hymenopteran pollinators of cucurbits and gourds, making collection trips to South America. He talked about the possible application of New World bees for pollination at the International Congress of Entomology at Vienna. He retired in 1960 but continued field studies as an emeritus professor for 27 years.
