= Ray F. Smith =

Ray Fred Smith (20 January 1919, Los Angeles – 23 August 1999, Lafayette) was an American agronomist and entomologist whose research focused on biological methods of arthropod pest management. He was a chair of the Entomology Department at the University of California at Berkeley from 1959 to 1973. He was an editor of the Annual Review of Entomology from 1960 to 1977.

== Biography ==
Smith was born in Los Angeles and grew up in Monterey. He received his BS, MS and PhD from the University of California, Berkeley where he was influenced by E.O. Essig, A.E. Michelbacher, and E.G. Linsley. He joined as a faculty in 1941 at Berkeley and his teaching focused on an ecological approach to insects that examined natural population regulation factors and only sought minimal targeted use of pesticides. He was instrumental in expanding the program to include four subdivisions within the field. During this time, he was also director for the University of California for Pest Management and Related Environmental Protection Project with UC/AID, and later, executive director of the Consortium for International Crop Protection. Smith also helped to establish the Panel of Experts on Integrated Pest Control of the United Nations Food and Agriculture Organization and the United Nations Environment Programme.

Beginning in 1972, Smith was an associate project director of the Huffaker Project, which coordinated the research of scientists at 18 land-grant universities regarding integrated pest management for six major crops. It was through this endeavor that Smith met and developed breakthrough techniques of Integrated Pest Management (IPM) with Perry L. Adkisson. By using locally relevant ecological methods to control insects, weeds, and disease, integrated pest management allows farmers to reduce their use of and reliance upon pesticides while increasing profits.

Along with Adkisson, Smith was awarded the World Food Prize in 1997 for his achievements in implementing IPM both in the United States and in developing countries. He also received the C.W. Woodworth Award for Outstanding Achievements in Entomology of the ESA, an honorary doctorate from College van Dekanen, Wageningen, and a UC Berkeley Citation after his retirement.

Smith died on 23 August 1999. He was 80 years old and was survived by his wife Elizabeth, a son and a daughter.
