= Perry Adkisson =

Dr. Perry L. Adkisson
- Born: March 11, 1929
- Died: June 25, 2020 (aged 91)
- Education: University of Arkansas (BS and MS); Kansas State University (PhD); Harvard (postdoc)
- Known for: Developing the new field of integrated pest management (IPM)
- Spouses: Frances Adkisson; Gloria R. Adkisson
- Awards: Alexander von Humboldt Award, Wolf Prize, and World Food Prize
- Scientific career
- Fields: Integrated Pest Management
- Institutions: Texas A&M

Perry L. Adkisson (11 March 1929 – 25 June 2020) was Chancellor of the Texas A&M University System. His academic work is known for his research on integrated pest management methods which allowed for a 50% reduction of insecticide use in U.S. agriculture.

== Early life and education ==
Adkisson was born 11 March 1929 on his family's cotton/soybean farm in Blytheville, Arkansas. He was the second of two children born to Robert and Imogene Adkisson. He graduated valedictorian from Armorel High School.

Adkisson attended the University of Arkansas where he earned his bachelor's degree in agriculture in 1950 and a master's degree in agronomy in 1954. He received a doctorate in entomology from Kansas State University in 1956. He also completed his postdoctoral studies at Harvard University.

== Career ==
=== Army ===
He was inducted into the U.S. Army in 1951 during the Korean War, and released from service in 1953, and returned to University of Arkansas to study for his master's degree.

=== Professorship at Texas A&M ===
After a short time teaching at the University of Missouri, he began his career as a professor of entomology at Texas A&M University in 1958. He later became head of the department.

As part of the Huffaker Project, a collaborative project between multiple universities and government agencies, Adkisson joined with Ray F. Smith of the University of California to further their similar research in the field of sustainable insect control, resulting in what is now known as integrated pest management.

Adkisson began working to have President George H.W. Bush and the U.S. National Archives to locate the presidential library on the campus of Texas A&M as soon as Bush was elected. Later, Adkisson was named as executive director of the Bush Presidential Library and the George H.W. Bush Presidential Library Foundation.

Adkisson served as the chancellor of the A&M University System from 1986 until 1990. He also served as deputy chancellor, vice president for agriculture and renewable resources, and the head of the Department of Entomology. Adkisson was also named Regents of entomology, Chancellor Emeritus and Distinguished Emeritus.

He retired from Texas A&M in 1994. In 2001, he received a Doctor of Letters from Texas A&M for his work in integrated pest management.

== Awards and recognition ==
Adkisson received what are considered the three most important international awards in agriculture: Adkisson and Smith were jointly awarded the World Food Prize in 1997 for this achievement. Adkisson was also awarded the Wolf Prize in Agriculture in 1994 and the 1980 Alexander von Humboldt Award for his achievements in agriculture. In 1998, he was inducted into the Texas Heritage Hall of Honor at the State Fair of Texas. He was elected to the National Academy of Sciences, the American Academy of Arts and Sciences, and was the president of the Entomological Society of America.
