= Integrated pest management =

Approach for economic control of pests

Integrated pest management (IPM), also known as integrated pest control (IPC) combines both non-chemical and chemical practices for economic control of pests, reducing reliance on chemicals while improving productivity and health. The UN's Food and Agriculture Organization defines IPM as follows:

"IPM is the careful consideration of all available pest control techniques and subsequent integration of appropriate measures that discourage the development of pest populations. It combines biological, chemical, physical and crop specific (cultural) management strategies and practices to grow healthy crops and minimize the use of pesticides, reducing or minimizing risks posed by pesticides to human health and the environment for sustainable pest management."

First developed for agricultural pest management, IPM programs are also used to deal with diseases, weeds, insects and animal pests at residential and commercial locations, lawns and turf, community gardens and homes. IPM is a safer pest control framework than reliance on chemical pesticides, mitigating risks such as insecticide-induced resurgence, pesticide resistance and (especially food) crop residues. Predictive models are useful tools in the implementation of IPM programs.

== Principles ==
Integrated pest management relies on understanding the structure and functions of an ecosystem. Multiple techniques are dynamically combined and adjusted in response to changes in environmental, economic, and social conditions. Programs developed in one region may need to be adapted before they can be successfully adopted in another region, to address differences in biological variation in pest ecosystems, environmental conditions, scale and capacity of response, regulatory environment, and cultural context.

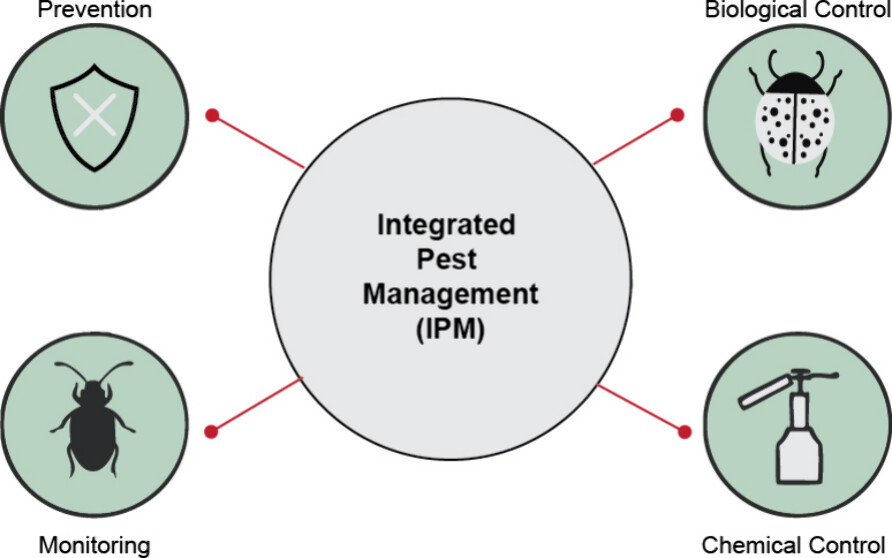

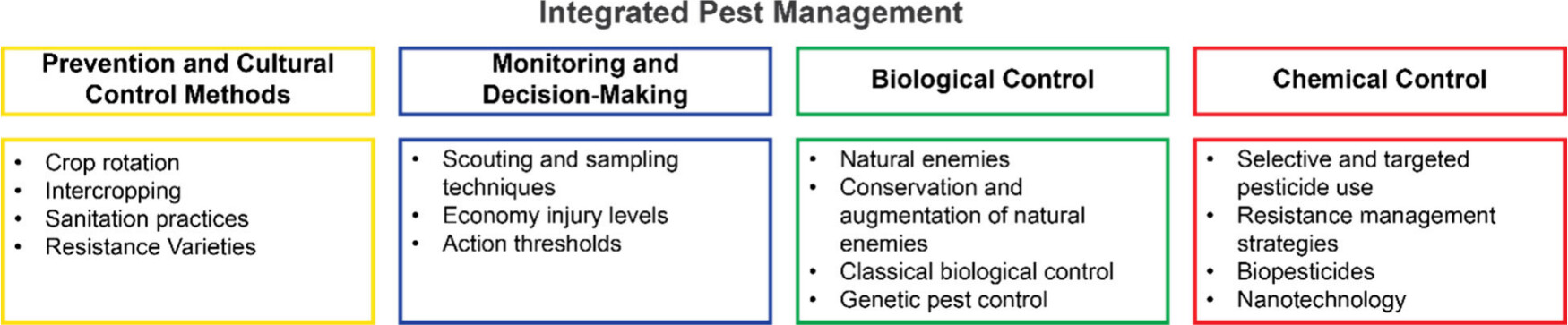
Key components of an Integrated Pest Management (IPM) program

=== Prevention ===
Cultural practices—The first line of defense for a garden or farm is to select varieties suited to local growing conditions such as resistant varieties and maintain healthy crops. Cultural practices may include techniques such as crop rotation and intercropping to promote healthy growing conditions.

Sanitation practices are essential. When dealing with plants, one can quarantine or remove diseased plants and take preventive measures such as cleaning of equipment (e.g. pruning shears) and selective disposal of debris to prevent spread of infections and pests. Sanitation practices that remove sources of food, water, and shelter are essential to protect homes from pests. Schools, health care facilities, food services and other businesses also require careful and ongoing sanitation practices.

If pests reach an unacceptable level, mechanical control methods can be used, such as simple hand-picking to remove insects, water spraying, vacuuming, barriers, and traps. Tillage can be detrimental to soil structure, but it is sometimes used in coordination with the life cycles of pests.

=== Monitoring ===
Acceptable pest levels—IPM holds that wiping out an entire pest population is often impossible, and the attempt can be expensive and unsafe. Emphasis is placed on control, not eradication.

IPM programs identify acceptable pest levels or action thresholds based on estimated economic injury, and apply controls if those thresholds are exceeded. An economic injury level is the pest population level at which damage to a crop will be greater than the cost of treating the pest. An economic threshold is the population size at which action must be taken to prevent the pest population from reaching the economic injury level. Thresholds are pest and site specific, meaning that it may be acceptable to have a weed such at one site, but not at another site. For example, white clover may be acceptable on the sides of a tee box on a golf course, but not in the fairway where it could interfere with play.

Allowing a pest population to survive at a reasonable threshold reduces selection pressure. This lowers the rate at which a pest develops resistance to a control, because if almost all pests are killed then those that have resistance will provide the genetic basis of the future population. Retaining a significant number of unresistant specimens dilutes the prevalence of any resistant genes that appear. Similarly, the repeated use of a single class of controls will create pest populations that are more resistant to that class, whereas alternating among classes helps prevent this.

Regular observation is critically important for inspection, pest identification and ongoing monitoring. Scouting and sampling techniques such as visual inspection, insect and spore traps, and other methods are used to monitor pest levels. Automated systems using AI are also being developed for monitoring, but face obstacles in terms of their cost, effectiveness, mobility, and scalability to use in the field.

Record-keeping is essential, as is a thorough knowledge of target pest behavior and reproductive cycles. Insects are cold-blooded, so their physical development is dependent on area temperatures. Many insects have had their development cycles modeled in terms of degree-days. For example, degree-day models have been developed for invasive pests such as the fall armyworm (Spodoptera frugiperda), whose egg, larval and pupal development rates increase linearly with temperature over roughly 18–30 °C, allowing prediction of generation timing and the geographic limits of the pest's establishment. The degree days of an environment determines the optimal time for a specific insect outbreak. Plant pathogens follow similar patterns of response to weather and season. However, these are increasingly disrupted by climate change.

=== Biological controls ===
Natural biological processes and materials can be used as biological control agents (BCAs), with acceptable environmental impact, often at low cost. The main approach is to promote beneficial insects or other predators that eat or parasitize target pests. Augmentative biocontrol involves increasing natural enemies and pathogens such as predators, parasitoids or microbes, so that they can fight pests and diseases in an area on a timely basis. Conservation biocontrol uses farming practices to better support existing populations of natural enemies already in the environment, such as ladybugs, so that they increase. Classical biological control or importation biocontrol introduces new populations of natural enemies or pathogens which may not be native to an area.

Beneficial fungi and bacteria produce bioactive compounds that can protect soil and crops from bacterial, fungal, and nematode diseases, reducing the need for fungicides. Beneficial bacteria can improve plant growth and control disease without harming the environment.

Genetic pest control introduces genetically modified organisms to reduce pest populations. For example, the sterile insect technique (SIT) releases sterilized males of a given species so that matings will be infertile. By targeting the reproductive capacity of the target pest, population size is reduced to non-critical levels. Other genetic approaches manipulate sex determination genes, increase the occurrence of dominant lethal genes, or skew sex ratios in the population. Genetic control programs' success depends on the dispersal rate, longevity, and mating success of introduced pests.

=== Chemical controls ===
Synthetic pesticides, which include insecticides, fungicides, and herbicides, have been shown to have a wide range of negative effects on non-target as well as target organisms. Responsible use of pesticides involves using them only as required and often only at specific times in a pest's life cycle.

Biological insecticides, derived from naturally occurring microorganisms (e.g.—Bt, entomopathogenic fungi and entomopathogenic nematodes), also fall in the category of chemical controls. Many newer pesticides are derived from plants or naturally occurring substances (e.g.—nicotine, pyrethrum and insect juvenile hormone analogues), but the toxophore or active component may be altered to provide increased biological activity or stability. Chemical controls also include horticultural oils.

Applications of pesticides must reach their intended targets and avoid harming nontarget species. The application technique must be matched to the crop, the pest, and the pesticide. For example, the use of low-volume spray equipment can reduce overall pesticide use and operational costs. Taking all recommended precautions is critical. IPM is an alternative to calendar-based pest control approaches which are becoming less effective, in part due to climate change.

IPM practices known as resistance management are essential in preventing and slowing the development of resistance to chemical controls, including biological insecticides.

=== Process ===
Using these components, integrated pest management becomes an ongoing process that can be thought of in terms of six repeatable steps:

Step 1	Sample for Pests (Inspect and Monitor)	Is there a real problem?
Step 2	Proper Identification	Is it really the pest you think it is?
Step 3	Learn the Pest Biology	Will it be a long-term problem or will it be gone next week?
Step 4	Determine an Action Threshold	Do you need to act?
Step 5	Choose Tactics	What's the best treatment?
Step 6	Evaluate	How did it work?

== Applications ==
IPM is used in a wide range of application areas, each of which may have specific concerns and recommended techniques. These include agriculture, horticulture, forestry, human habitations, preventive conservation of cultural property and general pest control, including structural pest management, turf pest management and ornamental pest management.

=== Residential pest management ===
Integrated Pest Management (IPM) can be an effective approach for dealing with pests in one's home or yard. Pests such as cockroaches, mice, and rats are harmful to human health. They worsen indoor air quality and can trigger asthma and allergy attacks. Pest problems can be addressed in a sustainable way using information about specific pests, their environment, and safe pest control methods.

In homes, it is essential to understand and control access to food, water, and hiding places, all of which pests need to survive. IPM focuses on prevention, sanitation, and exclusion of pests rather than chemical controls. It involves identifying pests, sealing entry points, and removing food and water sources. IPM prioritizes low-toxicity methods to create a healthy home environment.

The first step is monitoring to identify the pest and where it is living. Check regularly for pest activity. Sanitation is essential to remove sources of food and water: keep your house dry and clean, fix leaks, store food (including pet food) in sealed containers, clean up crumbs and spills by sweeping and washing floors and counters, don't leave food about, and dispose of recyclables and trash properly. Exclusion prevents pests from gaining access to your home: seal cracks both indoors and outdoors, fix holes or gaps in walls, floors, and ceilings, repair window screens, and use door sweeps to ensure that doors fit tightly. Keep plants and objects clear of the foundation of your house.

Capture rodents by using trapping devices. If chemicals are necessary for dealing with pests, select the least toxic, most targeted options. Use chemicals (including baits) carefully, to protect sensitive individuals from chemical exposure. Keep them out of reach of children and pets.

=== Agricultural pest management ===
IPM is the selection and use of pest control actions to achieve favourable economic, ecological and social consequences. A formal IPM process starts with monitoring, which includes inspection and identification.

Monitoring begins immediately, before the pest's activity becomes significant. Monitoring of agricultural pests includes tracking soil/planting media fertility and water quality. Overall plant health and resistance to pests is greatly influenced by pH, alkalinity, of dissolved mineral and oxygen reduction potential. Many diseases are waterborne, spread directly by irrigation water and indirectly by splashing.

Once the pest is known, knowledge of its lifecycle provides the optimal intervention points. For example, weeds reproducing from last year's seed can be prevented with mulches and pre-emergent herbicide.

Mistaken identification of a pest may result in ineffective actions. E.g., plant damage due to over-watering could be mistaken for fungal infection, since many fungal and viral infections arise under moist conditions.

Monitoring is followed by the establishment of economic injury levels. Economic Injury level is the pest population level at which crop damage exceeds the cost of treatment of pest. The economic injury levels determine the economic threshold level, the population level at which action should be taken to prevent the pest population from increasing beyond acceptable levels. Action threshold levels can also be established based on outcomes other than economic damage. Economic injury levels are more common in classic agricultural pest management, and action thresholds in structural pest management. Green pest management IPM programs may additionally prioritize goals such as reducing contamination, lowering greenhouse gas emissions, and conserving biodiversity in addition to economic goals.

Risk assessment usually includes four issues: 1) characterization of biological control agents, 2) health risks, 3) environmental risks and 4) efficacy. An example of differing action thresholds based on risk assessment would be that one fly in a barn would be acceptable, but one fly in a hospital operating room would not be acceptable. Once a threshold has been crossed by the pest population action steps need to be taken to reduce and control the pest.

Pest-tolerant crops such as soybeans may not warrant interventions unless the pests are numerous or rapidly increasing. Intervention is warranted if the expected cost of damage by the pest is more than the cost of control. Specific sites may also have varying requirements.

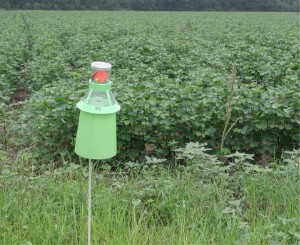
An IPM boll weevil trap in a cotton field (Manning, South Carolina)

Integrated pest management employs a variety of actions including cultural controls, physical barriers, mechanical interventions, biological controls such as adding and conserving natural predators and enemies of the pest, and finally chemical controls or pesticides. Cultural controls include keeping an area free of conducive conditions by removing waste or diseased plants, flooding, sanding, and the use of disease-resistant crop varieties. Mechanical/physical controls include picking pests off plants, or using netting or other material to exclude pests such as birds from grapes or rodents from structures. Biological controls are numerous. They include conservation of natural predators, augmentation of natural predators, and sterile insect technique (SIT).

IPM can include the use of livestock. Animals like goats, chickens and ducks can be used to control weeds, insects and other unwanted organisms. Goats are able to eat poison ivy, a plant that is toxic to other species. Chickens are often used in orchards to scratch away at leaf litter where they eat insects, weed seeds and larva. Livestock IPM reduces the need for chemical alternatives. There are many benefits, one being a producer of manure and improving soil fertility. Live stock can be incredibly effective when monitored carefully.

Augmentation, inoculative release and inundate release are different methods of biological control that affect the target pest in different ways. Augmentative control includes the periodic introduction of predators. With inundative release, predators are collected, mass-reared and periodically released in large numbers into the pest area. This is used for an immediate reduction in host populations, generally for annual crops, but is not suitable for long run use.

With inoculative release a limited number of beneficial organisms are introduced at the start of the growing season. This strategy offers long term control as the organism's progeny affect pest populations throughout the season and is common in orchards. With seasonal inoculative release the beneficials are collected, mass-reared and released seasonally to maintain the beneficial population. This is commonly used in greenhouses.

In greenhouse crop production, predators and parasitoids may be introduced preventively, before pest populations become established or reach economic injury levels. Establishment and persistence of these natural enemies can be supported by alternative foods, banker plants or other shelters, greenhouse climate management, and avoidance of pesticide side effects from residuals. Establishment can be more difficult in some ornamental crops due to a lower pest tolerance and natural enemies may not successfully persist in every crop.

In America and other western countries, inundative releases are predominant, while Asia and the eastern Europe more commonly use inoculation and occasional introductions.

The sterile insect technique (SIT) is an area-wide IPM program that introduces sterile male pests into the pest population to trick females into (unsuccessful) breeding encounters, providing a form of birth control and reducing reproduction rates. The biological controls mentioned above only appropriate in extreme cases, because in the introduction of new species, or supplementation of naturally occurring species can have detrimental ecosystem effects. Biological controls can be used to stop invasive species or pests, but they can become an introduction path for new pests.

Reliance on knowledge, experience, observation and integration of multiple techniques makes IPM appropriate for organic farming (excluding synthetic pesticides). These may or may not include materials listed on the Organic Materials Review Institute (OMRI) Although the pesticides and particularly insecticides used in organic farming and organic gardening are generally safer than synthetic pesticides, they are not always more safe or environmentally friendly than synthetic pesticides and can cause harm. For conventional farms IPM can reduce human and environmental exposure to hazardous chemicals, and potentially lower overall costs.

Pesticides can be classified by their modes of action. Rotating among materials with diverse modes of action minimizes pest resistance.

Semiochemical controls use insect- or plant-produced chemical signals such as sex pheromones and plant volatile organic compounds (VOCs) to monitor or disrupt pest populations without directly killing them. Pheromone-baited traps are widely used for population monitoring, while mating disruption (broadcasting synthetic pheromone throughout a crop to prevent males from locating females) has been applied against numerous moth pests, including tortricid pests of stone fruit, table grapes and citrus. Because many semiochemical lures release naturally occurring compounds at very low rates, studies have found they do not significantly alter the background volatile organic compound profile already present in a crop, addressing concerns about their toxicological and ecotoxicological impact relative to conventional pesticides.

Evaluation is the process of assessing whether the intervention was effective, whether it produced unacceptable side effects, whether to continue, revise or abandon the program.

== United States (History) ==
Early cultural practices in pest management like handpicking insects and pulling weeds likely date to 10,000 to 16,000 years ago, with the beginnings of agriculture, the cultivation of plants and domestication of animals. Prior to World War II, the chemicals that were known and used for pest control were derived from plants and inorganic compounds like cyanide and arsenic. The development of synthetic chemical insecticides was heavily driven by wartime research into both pest control and chemical weapons.

In the United States, the idea that "biological and chemical control are considered as supplementary to one another" was stated as early as 1939, in an influential paper by California entomologists William Muriece Hoskins, Arthur D. Borden, and Abraham E. Michelbacher. The work of early entomologists who advocated for an ecological approach to agricultural pest control influenced a generation of scientists who were key to the development of integrated pest management. They included Ray F. Smith, Harold T. Reynolds, Robert van den Bosch, and Perry Adkisson, among others.

In 1949, Ray F. Smith and Gordon L. Smith reported on a three year project on the northwest side of the San Joaquin Valley in which "supervised control of insects" was used to control pests on alfalfa. Insect control was "supervised" by qualified entomologists based on periodic monitoring of pest and natural-enemy populations.

Supervised control provided a conceptual basis for the concept of "integrated control", articulated by Smith, Michelbacher and others in the 1950s. The term "integrated control" was introduced to entomological literature by Michelbacher and Bacon in 1952. The first discussion of the concept of integrated control was presented by R.F. Smith and W.W. Allen in 1954. It was followed by the foundational publication "The Integrated Control Concept" in Hilgardia in October 1959. In this publication, Vernon M. Stern, Ray Smith, Robert van den Bosch, and Kenneth Sverre Hagen described in detail the fundamental ideas of integrated control, economic injury levels and economic thresholds.

In 1956, entomologist Perry Adkisson completed his Ph.D. at Kansas State University and joined the entomology department at the University of Missouri. In 1958 he moved to Texas A&M University in the US Cotton Belt. There he worked with the U.S. Department of Agriculture to develop and implement an effective integrated control program for the pink bollworm. He later developed an integrated approach that prevented the spread of the boll weevil (Anthonomus grandis) in cotton in the High Plains of Texas, leading to its eradication in almost all parts of the U.S.A. After their first meeting in the 1960s, Adkisson often collaborated with Ray Smith, developing and promoting integrated pest management. They were involved in national projects such as the Huffaker Project in 1972, in which nearly 300 scientists developed pest management programs for six major crops, and the Adkisson Project, in which scientists at 18 universities focused on apples, alfalfa, cotton, and soybeans. Working with the Consortium for International Crop Protection, they presented their ideas throughout the developing world. For their many contributions to the development and use of IPM, Adkisson and Smith received the 1997 World Food Prize.

Entomologists and ecologists have urged the adoption of IPM pest control in the United States since the 1970s. IPM was formulated into national policy in February 1972 as directed by President Richard Nixon. In 1979, President Jimmy Carter established an interagency IPM Coordinating Committee to ensure development and implementation of IPM practices.

Integrated control sought to identify the best mix of chemical and biological controls for a given insect pest. Chemical insecticides were to be used in the manner least disruptive to biological control. The term "integrated" was thus synonymous with "compatible". Chemical controls were to be applied only after regular monitoring indicated that a pest population had reached a level that required treatment (the economic threshold) to prevent the population from reaching a level at which economic losses would exceed the cost of the control measures (the economic injury level).

IPM extended the concept of integrated control to all classes of pests and was expanded to include all tactics. Controls such as pesticides were to be applied as in integrated control, but these now had to be compatible with tactics for all classes of pests. Other tactics, such as host-plant resistance and cultural manipulations, became part of the IPM framework. IPM combined entomologists, plant pathologists, nematologists and weed scientists.

== Southeast Asia ==
The Green Revolution of the 1960s and '70s introduced sturdier plants that could support the heavier grain loads resulting from intensive fertilizer use. Pesticide imports by 11 Southeast Asian countries grew nearly sevenfold in value between 1990 and 2010, according to FAO statistics, with disastrous results. Rice farmers become accustomed to spraying soon after planting, triggered by signs of the leaf folder moth, which appears early in the growing season. It causes only superficial damage and doesn't reduce yields. In 1986, Indonesia banned 57 pesticides and completely stopped subsidizing their use. Progress was reversed in the 2000s, when growing production capacity, particularly in China, reduced prices. Rice production in Asia more than doubled. But it left farmers believing more is better—whether it's seed, fertilizer, or pesticides.

The brown planthopper, Nilaparvata lugens, the farmers' main target, has become increasingly resistant. Since 2008, outbreaks have devastated rice harvests throughout Asia, but not in the Mekong Delta. Reduced spraying allowed natural predators to neutralize planthoppers in Vietnam. In 2010 and 2011, massive planthopper outbreaks hit 400,000 hectares of Thai rice fields, causing losses of about $64 million. The Thai government is now pushing the "no spray in the first 40 days" approach.

By contrast early spraying kills frogs, spiders, wasps and dragonflies that prey on the later-arriving and dangerous planthopper and produced resistant strains. Planthoppers now require pesticide doses 500 times greater than originally. Overuse indiscriminately kills beneficial insects and decimates bird and amphibian populations. Pesticides are suspected of harming human health and became a common means for rural Asians to commit suicide.

In 2001, 950 Vietnamese farmers tried IPM. In one plot, each farmer grew rice using their usual amounts of seed and fertilizer, applying pesticide as they chose. In a nearby plot, less seed and fertilizer were used and no pesticides were applied for 40 days after planting. Yields from the experimental plots were as good or better and costs were lower, generating 8% to 10% more net income. The experiment led to the "three reductions, three gains" campaign, claiming that cutting the use of seed, fertilizer and pesticide would boost yield, quality and income. Posters, leaflets, TV commercials and a 2004 radio soap opera that featured a rice farmer who gradually accepted the changes. It didn't hurt that a 2006 planthopper outbreak hit farmers using insecticides harder than those who did not. Mekong Delta farmers cut insecticide spraying from five times per crop cycle to zero to one.

The Plant Protection Center and the International Rice Research Institute (IRRI) have been encouraging farmers to grow flowers, okra, and beans on rice paddy banks, instead of stripping vegetation, as was typical. The plants attract bees and wasps that eat planthopper eggs, while the vegetables diversify farm incomes.

Agriculture companies offer bundles of pesticides with seeds and fertilizer, with incentives for volume purchases. A proposed law in Vietnam requires licensing pesticide dealers and government approval of advertisements to prevent exaggerated claims. Insecticides that target other pests, such as Scirpophaga incertulas (stem borer), the larvae of moth species that feed on rice plants allegedly yield gains of 21% with proper use.

== See also ==
- Agroecology
- Agronomy
- Biodynamic agriculture
- Endangered arthropod
- Forest integrated pest management
- Integrated pest management (cultural property)
- UAV-IQ
- International Organization for Biological Control
- Pesticide application
- Physical pest control
- Professional Landcare Network (PLANET)
- Push-pull technology
- Rodentology
- Soil contamination
- Sustainable agriculture
