= Pesticide resistance =

Decreased effectiveness of a pesticide on a pest

Pesticide application can artificially select for resistant pests. In this diagram, the first generation happens to have an insect with a heightened resistance to a pesticide (red) After pesticide application, its descendants represent a larger proportion of the population, because sensitive pests (white) have been selectively killed. After repeated applications, resistant pests may comprise the majority of the population.

Pesticide resistance describes the decreased susceptibility of a pest population to a pesticide that was previously effective at controlling the pest. Pest species evolve pesticide resistance via natural selection: the most resistant specimens survive and pass on their acquired heritable changes traits to their offspring. If a pest has resistance then that will reduce the pesticide's efficacy – efficacy and resistance are inversely related.

Cases of resistance have been reported in all classes of pests (i.e. crop diseases, weeds, rodents, etc.), with 'crises' in insect control occurring early-on after the introduction of pesticide use in the 20th century. The Insecticide Resistance Action Committee (IRAC) definition of insecticide resistance is 'a heritable change in the sensitivity of a pest population that is reflected in the repeated failure of a product to achieve the expected level of control when used according to the label recommendation for that pest species'.

Pesticide resistance is increasing. Farmers in the US lost 7% of their crops to pests in the 1940s; over the 1980s and 1990s, the loss was 13%, even though more pesticides were being used. Over 500 species of pests have evolved a resistance to a pesticide. Other sources estimate the number to be around 1,000 species since 1945.

Although the evolution of pesticide resistance is usually discussed as a result of pesticide use, it is important to keep in mind that pest populations can also adapt to non-chemical methods of control. For example, the northern corn rootworm (Diabrotica barberi) became adapted to a corn-soybean crop rotation by spending the year when the field is planted with soybeans in a diapause.

As of 2014, few new weed killers are near commercialization, and none with a novel, resistance-free mode of action. Similarly, as of January 2019 discovery of new insecticides is more expensive and difficult than ever.

== Causes ==
Pesticide resistance probably stems from multiple factors:

- Many pest species produce large numbers of offspring, for example insect pests produce large broods. This increases the probability of mutations and ensures the rapid expansion of resistant populations.
- Pest species had been exposed to natural toxins long before agriculture began. For example, many plants produce phytotoxins to protect them from herbivores. As a result, coevolution of herbivores and their host plants required development of the physiological capability to detoxify or tolerate poisons. Secondary metabolites or allelochemicals produced by plants inhibit insect feeding, but insects have evolved enzymes to metabolize or detoxify them by converting them into non-toxic metabolites. The same enzymes may also detoxify insecticides by converting lipophic compounds into ones that are excreted or otherwise removed from the insect. Greater exposure to insect-inhibiting secondary metabolites or allelochemicals is more likely to increase pesticide resistance. One group of chemicals produced by insects to detoxify toxins are esterases which can detoxify organophosphates and pyrethroid. Conditions that affect how resistant some insects are to insecticides include exposure to different amounts of secondary metabolites or allelochemicals, which are variable among plant species in response to different degrees of herbivory pressure. The way an insect feeds on a plant impacts their exposure; insects that feed on the vascular tissue (sap sucking insects like aphids) are generally exposed to less insect-inhibiting compounds than insects that consume the leaves. Plants produce a wide range of defensive chemical compounds and generalist insects that feed on different types of plants can increase their exposure to them increasing their likelihood of developing pesticide resistance.
- Humans often rely almost exclusively on pesticides for pest control. This increases selection pressure towards resistance. Pesticides that fail to break down quickly contribute to selection for resistant strains even after they are no longer being applied.
- In response to resistance, managers may increase pesticide quantities/frequency, which exacerbates the problem. In addition, some pesticides are toxic toward species that feed on or compete with pests. This can paradoxically allow the pest population to expand, requiring more pesticides. This is sometimes referred to as the pesticide trap, or a pesticide treadmill, since farmers progressively pay more for less benefit.
- Insect predators and parasites generally have smaller populations and are less likely to evolve resistance than are pesticides' primary targets, such as mosquitoes and those that feed on plants. Weakening them allows the pests to flourish. Alternatively, resistant predators can be bred in laboratories.
- Pests with limited viable range (such as insects with a specific diet of a few related crop plants) are more likely to evolve resistance, because they are exposed to higher pesticide concentrations and has less opportunity to breed with unexposed populations.
- Pests with shorter generation times develop resistance more quickly than others.
- The social dynamics of farmers: Farmers following the common practices of their peers is sometimes problematic in this case. Overrelying on pesticides is a popular mistake and becomes increasingly popular as farmers conform to the practices around them.
- Unfamiliarity with variation in regulatory enforcement can hamper policy makers' ability to produce real change in the course of resistance evolution.

== Examples ==
Resistance has evolved in multiple species: resistance to insecticides was first documented by A. L. Melander in 1914 when scale insects demonstrated resistance to an inorganic insecticide. Between 1914 and 1946, 11 additional cases were recorded. The development of organic insecticides, such as DDT, gave hope that insecticide resistance was a dead issue. However, by 1947 housefly resistance to DDT had evolved. With the introduction of every new insecticide class – cyclodienes, carbamates, formamidines, organophosphates, pyrethroids, even Bacillus thuringiensis – cases of resistance surfaced within two to 20 years.

- Studies in America have shown that fruit flies that infest orange groves were becoming resistant to malathion.
- In Hawaii, Japan and Tennessee, the diamondback moth evolved a resistance to Bacillus thuringiensis about three years after it began to be used heavily.
- In England, rats in certain areas have evolved resistance that allows them to consume up to five times as much rat poison as normal rats without dying.
- DDT is no longer effective in preventing malaria in some places. Resistance developed slowly in the 1960s due to agricultural use. This pattern was especially noted and synthesized by Mouchet 1988.
- In the southern United States, Amaranthus palmeri, which interferes with cotton production, has evolved resistance to the herbicide glyphosate and overall has resistance to five sites of action in the southern US as of 2021.
- The Colorado potato beetle has evolved resistance to 52 different compounds belonging to all major insecticide classes. Resistance levels vary across populations and between beetle life stages, but in some cases can be very high (up to 2,000-fold).
- The cabbage looper is an agricultural pest that is becoming increasingly problematic due to its increasing resistance to Bacillus thuringiensis, as demonstrated in Canadian greenhouses. Further research found a genetic component to Bt resistance.
- The widespread introduction of Rattus norvegicus (the brown rat) combined with the widespread use of anticoagulent rodenticides such as warfarin has produced almost equally widespread resistance to vitamin K antagonist rodenticides around the world.
- In aquatic environments, non-target organisms have also demonstrated pesticide resistance. A study on Gammarus roeselii and Hyalella azteca found that after only two generations of exposure to the neonicotinoid thiacloprid, tolerance levels nearly doubled. The research suggests that developmental plasticity, rather than genetic mutations alone, may contribute to rapid resistance in some species.

== Consequences ==
Insecticides are widely used across the world to increase agricultural productivity and quality in vegetables and grains (and to a lesser degree the use for vector control for livestock). The resulting resistance has reduced function for those very purposes, and in vector control for humans.

== Multiple and cross-resistance ==
- Multiple-resistance pests are resistant to more than one class of pesticide. This can happen when pesticides are used in sequence, with a new class replacing one to which pests display resistance with another.
- Cross-resistance, a related phenomenon, occurs when the genetic mutation that made the pest resistant to one pesticide also makes it resistant to others, often those with a similar mechanism of action.

== Adaptation ==
Pests becomes resistant by evolving physiological changes that protect them from the chemical.

One protection mechanism is to increase the number of copies of a gene, allowing the organism to produce more of a protective enzyme that breaks the pesticide into less toxic chemicals. Such enzymes include esterases, glutathione transferases, aryldialkylphosphatase and mixed microsomal oxidases (oxidases expressed within microsomes).

Alternatively, the number and/or sensitivity of biochemical receptors that bind to the pesticide may be reduced.

Behavioral resistance has been described for some chemicals. For example, some Anopheles mosquitoes evolved a preference for resting outside that kept them away from pesticide sprayed on interior walls.

Resistance may involve rapid excretion of toxins, secretion of them within the body away from vulnerable tissues and decreased penetration through the body wall.

Mutation in only a single gene can lead to the evolution of a resistant organism. In other cases, multiple genes are involved. Resistant genes are usually autosomal. This means that they are located on autosomes (as opposed to allosomes, also known as sex chromosomes). As a result, resistance is inherited similarly in males and females. Also, resistance is usually inherited as an incompletely dominant trait. When a resistant individual mates with a susceptible individual, their progeny generally has a level of resistance intermediate between the parents.

Adaptation to pesticides comes with an evolutionary cost, usually decreasing relative fitness of organisms in the absence of pesticides. Resistant individuals often have reduced reproductive output, life expectancy, mobility, etc. Non-resistant individuals sometimes grow in frequency in the absence of pesticides - but not always - so this is one way that is being tried to combat resistance.

Blowfly maggots produce an enzyme that confers resistance to organochloride insecticides. Scientists have researched ways to use this enzyme to break down pesticides in the environment, which would detoxify them and prevent harmful environmental effects. A similar enzyme produced by soil bacteria that also breaks down organochlorides works faster and remains stable in a variety of conditions.

Resistance to gene drive forms of population control is expected to occur and methods of slowing its development are being studied.

The molecular mechanisms of insecticide resistance only became comprehensible in 1997. Guerrero et al. 1997 used the newest methods of the time to find mutations producing pyrethroid resistance in dipterans. Even so, these adaptations to pesticides were unusually rapid and may not necessarily represent the norm in wild populations, under wild conditions. Natural adaptation processes take much longer and almost always happen in response to gentler pressures.

== Management ==
In order to remediate the problem it first must be ascertained what is really wrong. Assaying of suspected pesticide resistance - and not merely field observation and experience - is necessary because it may be mistaken for failure to apply the pesticide as directed, or microbial degradation of the pesticide.

The United Nations' World Health Organization established the Worldwide Insecticide resistance Network in March 2016, due to increasing need and increasing recognition, including the radical decline in function against pests of vegetables.

=== Integrated pest management ===
The Integrated pest management (IPM) approach provides a balanced approach to minimizing resistance.

Resistance can be managed by reducing use of a pesticide: which may also be beneficial for mitigating pest resurgence. This allows non-resistant organisms to out-compete resistant strains. They can later be killed by returning to use of the pesticide.

A complementary approach is to site untreated refuges near treated croplands where susceptible pests can survive.

When pesticides are the sole or predominant method of pest control, resistance is commonly managed through pesticide rotation. This involves switching among pesticide classes with different modes of action to delay or mitigate pest resistance. The Resistance Action Committees monitor resistance across the world, and in order to do that, each maintains a list of modes of action and pesticides that fall into those categories: the Fungicide Resistance Action Committee, the Weed Science Society of America (the Herbicide Resistance Action Committee no longer has its own scheme, and is contributing to WSSA's from now on), and the Insecticide Resistance Action Committee. The U.S. Environmental Protection Agency (EPA) also uses those classification schemes.

Manufacturers may recommend no more than a specified number of consecutive applications of a pesticide class be made before moving to a different pesticide class.

Two or more pesticides with different modes of action can be tankmixed on the farm to improve results and delay or mitigate existing pest resistance.

== Status ==
=== Glyphosate ===
Glyphosate-resistant weeds are now present in the vast majority of soybean, cotton, and corn farms in some U.S. states. Weeds resistant to multiple herbicide modes of action are also on the rise.

Before glyphosate, most herbicides would kill a limited number of weed species, forcing farmers to continually rotate their crops and herbicides to prevent resistance. Glyphosate disrupts the ability of most plants to construct new proteins. Glyphosate-tolerant transgenic crops are not affected.

A weed family that includes waterhemp (Amaranthus rudis) has developed glyphosate-resistant strains. A 2008 to 2009 survey of 144 populations of waterhemp in 41 Missouri counties revealed glyphosate resistance in 69%. Weed surveys from some 500 sites throughout Iowa in 2011 and 2012 revealed glyphosate resistance in approximately 64% of waterhemp samples.

In response to the rise in glyphosate resistance, farmers turned to other herbicides—applying several in a single season. In the United States, most midwestern and southern farmers continue to use glyphosate because it still controls most weed species, applying other herbicides, known as residuals, to deal with resistance.

The use of multiple herbicides appears to have slowed the spread of glyphosate resistance. From 2005 through 2010 researchers discovered 13 different weed species that had developed resistance to glyphosate. From 2010 to 2014 only two more were discovered.

A 2013 Missouri survey showed that multiply-resistant weeds had spread. 43% of the sampled weed populations were resistant to two different herbicides, 6% to three and 0.5% to four. In Iowa a survey revealed dual resistance in 89% of waterhemp populations, 25% resistant to three and 10% resistant to five.

Resistance increases pesticide costs. For southern cotton, herbicide costs climbed from between $50–$75 per hectare ($20–$30/acre) a few years ago to about $370 per hectare ($150/acre) in 2014. In the South, resistance contributed to the shift that reduced cotton planting by 70% in Arkansas and 60% in Tennessee. For soybeans in Illinois, costs rose from about $25–$160 per hectare ($10–$65/acre).

=== Bacillus thuringiensis ===
During 2009 and 2010, some Iowa fields showed severe injury to corn producing Bt toxin Cry3Bb1 by western corn rootworm. During 2011, mCry3A corn also displayed insect damage, including cross-resistance between these toxins. Resistance persisted and spread in Iowa. Bt corn that targets western corn rootworm does not produce a high dose of Bt toxin, and displays less resistance than that seen in a high-dose Bt crop.

Products such as Capture LFR (containing the pyrethroid bifenthrin) and SmartChoice (containing a pyrethroid and an organophosphate) have been increasingly used to complement Bt crops that farmers find alone to be unable to prevent insect-driven injury. Multiple studies have found the practice to be either ineffective or to accelerate the development of resistant strains.

== See also ==
- Antibiotic resistance
- Male accessory gland
- Persistent organic pollutant
- Stockholm Convention on Persistent Organic Pollutants
- Vavilovian mimicry
