= Carl Barton Huffaker =

American entomologist

Carl Barton Huffaker (September 30, 1914 in Monticello, Kentucky – October 10, 1995 in Lafayette, California) was an American biologist, ecologist and agricultural entomologist.

Huffaker graduated from the University of Tennessee (1938 B.S., 1939 M.S.) then gaining a PhD from Ohio State University in 1942. Huffaker was one of the first entomologists to study the use of DDT to control mosquito populations. After working as a medical entomologist in Colombia, Haiti, and the Dominican Republic he was recruited by Harry Scott Smith in 1946 to work as an assistant entomologist for the Division of Biological Control of the University of California. Huffaker's first assignment was the control of Klamath weed, particularly the use of Chrysolina quadrigemina. He remained at Berkeley until his retirement in 1984.

He published more than 200 scientific papers and edited and contributed to books "citation classics" in population ecology, biological control, and integrated pest management. Examples are Theory and Practice of Biological Control (1976) and Ecological Entomology (1984). He also conducted a notable experiment on predator–prey population dynamics in mites in 1958.

Huffaker was a Fellow of the Entomological Society of America served as its President and was an honorary Fellow of the Royal Entomological Society.

He was awarded the Louis E. Levy Medal in 1976. In 1994 he was awarded the Wolf Prize in Agriculture along with Perry L. Adkisson “for their contributions to the development and implementation of environmentally beneficial integrated pest management systems for the protection of agricultural crops”.
