= Kenneth Sverre Hagen =

American entomologist

Kenneth Sverre Hagen (26 November 1919 – 10 January 1997) was an American professor of entomology at the University of California, Berkeley who was a specialist on the predators of sucking pests such as psyllids and aphids. He worked on approaches to integrated pest management based on the augmentation of natural predators and parasites and in the use of nutrient sprays to encourage them. He made breakthroughs in the mass-rearing of lacewings and ladybird beetles.

Hagen was born in Oakland where he went to local schools, graduating from the Fremont High School before going to the University of California, Berkeley on a football scholarship. He obtained a BS in 1943 but his studies were interrupted by service as a naval officer in the second world war. He saw action in the beaches of Normandy and Okinawa. He returned to study after the war and became a technician at Berkeley from 1947. After obtaining his Ph.D. under Richard Doutt in 1952 he became a junior entomologist at the experimental station in Albany. He became a professor of entomology in 1969. He studied the migration of Hippodamia convergens, making use of hot-air balloons.
