= Robert van den Bosch =

American entomologist

Robert van den Bosch (31 March 1922 – 19 November 1978) was an American entomologist and proponent for the management of insect pests without the use of insecticides and especially through biological control. He was the author of the influential textbook on Biological Control first published in 1973 and a more influential popular book The Pesticide Conspiracy (1978) that aimed to inform the public of the threats of pesticides and how industrial forces influenced science and agriculture. He was among the few entomologists who took a stand against DDT and were outspoken during the public debates following the publication of Rachel Carson's Silent Spring (1962) and continued to be an activist aside from his scientific research at a time when it was unpopular for scientists to hold political opinions.

== Life ==
Van den Bosch, was born in Martinez, California, born of Dutch and Swiss descent. His father ran a floriculture business. After studying at the local public schools including Alhambra Union High School from where he graduated in 1939, he went to the University of California, Berkeley, receiving a BA in Physical Education in 1943. During the Second World War, he served in the US Naval Reserve as a Deck Officer in the Pacific. After the war, he went back to Berkeley and obtained a Ph.D. in entomology in 1950. He taught at the University of Hawaii and then moved to the University of California, Riverside in 1951 followed by a return to Berkeley in 1963 where he served as a professor until his death.

== Research and writing ==
The Pesticide Conspiracy was first published in 1978 and reviewers noted that van den Bosch was angry at the pest control industry which he accused of being dishonest, irresponsible and dangerous. He examined how the industry and its financial clout had managed to control the university scientists and maintain their grip on farmers and their practices. Van den Bosch coined the phrase Pesticide Mafia which led to a lot of reactions. He also introduced the phrase "Pesticide Treadmill" which talked about how insecticide resistance and pest resurgence was well-expected and how this led to increased used of toxic insecticides. Paul R. Ehrlich, a friend of Robert noted in preface to the posthumous 1989 edition that many of the farm leaders who had tried to oppose the grip of industry on agriculture including Cesar Chaves and Dolores Huerta had been physically attacked.

Van den Bosch's main research focus was in biological control and integrated pest management. He made numerous trips around the world in the search for natural enemies, insect parasites, and predators.

Robert van den Bosch had been a director of the Rachel Carson Trust, a Fellow of the American Association for the Advancement of Sciences, and a Guggenheim Fellow. He was keenly involved in sports and died from a heart attack while jogging.
