= MON 810 =

Monsanto genetically modified crop

The MON 810 corn is a genetically modified maize used around the world. It is a Zea mays line known as YieldGard from the company Monsanto. This plant is a genetically modified organism (GMO) designed to combat crop loss due to insects. There is an inserted gene in the DNA of MON 810 which allows the plant to make a protein that harms insects that try to eat it. The inserted gene is from the Bacillus thuringiensis which produces the Bt protein that is poisonous to insects in the order Lepidoptera (butterflies and moths), including the European corn borer.

These genetically modified plants with Bt protein are grown on a large scale around the world. Monsanto's corn line MON 810 is produced by ballistically transforming another corn line with a plasmid, PV-ZMCT10. This plasmid has a cauliflower mosaic virus 35S promoter and hsp70 maize intron sequences which drive the expression of the Cry1Ab gene. The gene then codes for delta endotoxins (Cry proteins) which are very potent toxins that provoke lesions in the cell membrane causing cell death. These produced Bt proteins bind to certain localized sites on the epithelium of the midgut of insects. Proteins need specific receptors on cells in order to form the Cry proteins and become toxic, which is why the toxins are specific for the order Lepidoptera. The receptors are important for binding the toxic protein and starting the signal cascade, but the exact mechanism of these toxins is not well understood.

== Controversy ==
MON 810's transgene structure differs from the original plasmid constructed for the safety assessment for Monsanto and has changed compared to the naturally occurring (non-active) Cry1Ab protein. Gilles-Eric Seralini and colleagues (2007 & 2009) re-analyzed Monsanto data for MON 810 (which was made available following a demand for public availability of the data, and a court case) and claimed that it had caused liver, kidney, and heart damage in rats. However, the European Food Safety Authority (EFSA) reviewed this re-analysis and concluded that the differences observed were within a normal range for control rats and deemed the statistical methods used inappropriate. Similar criticisms have been levelled at later work by Séralini involving rats he asserted to have developed cancer from consumption of genetically modified produce; see Séralini affair.

Several publications show effects from Cry1Ab on insects and other arthropods not belonging to the group of Lepidoptera. This indicates an effect on non-target species. Effects on non-target organisms (i.e. those outside the group of Lepidoptera) indicates that the Cry1Ab toxin has less specific modes of toxicity than previously assumed, or that the transgene insertion may cause unintended effects (e.g. changes in gene expression) in the plant.

On the 5 April 2012, Poland announced that it would ban the cultivation of MON 810 on its territory because the "pollen of this strain could have a harmful effect on bees." No evidence exists to suggest that bees are harmed by the Bt Protein, however prior to research implicating neonictinoid pesticides (usage of which is in fact reduced by planting of naturally pesticidal Bt crops,) colony collapse disorder was occasionally blamed on modified crops.

A 2010 paper (systematic review) by Agnes Ricroch et al. in the journal Transgenic Research, which reviewed several previously published meta-analyses and recent studies, concluded that the German decision to ban the cultivation of MON 810 was "scientifically unjustified." This is despite the fact that several of the meta-analyses reviewed actually indicate specific negative effects from Cry1Ab toxin on non-target organisms, although when compared to spraying with broad-spectrum pesticides, the negative effects on non-target organisms from Cry-toxins were lower.

Ricroch et al. claim that substantial evidence cited in their review is biased towards total eco-system effects and the German decision should have been based on a "case-by-case approach" and uses an incomplete list of references. The authors of this review also criticized the French ban and its political circumstances in an ISB News Report. As revealed in the WikiLeaks cables, after France banned the variety, Craig Stapleton, the US ambassador to France recommended that "we calibrate a target retaliation list that causes some pain across the EU".

In 2012, an article by Bøhn et al., in Environmental Sciences Europe, disagreed with the viewpoint of Ricroch et al. that the German ban was “scientifically unjustified”. In drawing their conclusion they point to the following weaknesses in the Ricroch et al. paper: i) important claims about the Daphnia magna study are incorrect (that the amount of toxin in the experiment was not presented), and ii) core results are omitted from the discussion (overall mortality differences and total fecundity). Furthermore, only selected data from the literature (those showing negative effects) were qualitatively scrutinized – studies showing no effect were simply quantitatively described without their quality being subjected to the same level of critique. The effect of such a double standard in the evaluation of the quality of biosafety science means that those only reading or referring to Ricroch et al. will be seriously misinformed about both the available biosafety science and the German ban on MON810 maize. However, Bøhn et al. do not claim that the ban was finally and irreversibly justified by the science referred to, as this was ultimately seen to be a political decision.

A 2012 paper in the Polish Journal of Veterinary Medicine found no difference between the number of honeybees that visited a MON 810 maize and a closely related maize.

Analysing the controversy over MON 810 in Europe and particularly the question of the quality of the biosafety science cited to support the German ban, Wickson and Wynne have highlighted how science for policy can be differentially framed in terms of its research questions, methods and data interpretation and how all studies performed, whether for or against an issue, can be legitimately debated in terms of the quality of their research process and the significance of their findings. They suggest that debates over the quality of science for policy in the case of MON 810 are not purely technical but rather are inherently shaped by unstated normative commitments and value judgments. Finally, they argue that for agricultural biotechnology, there are a range of conditions that make current practices of assessing the quality of biosafety science unethical. These include: a lack of open access to testing materials; limited resources for independent research; lack of transparency concerning the transgenic constructs in use; lack of consistency in the application of evidentiary and interpretive standards; and no clear processes ensuring accountability and consistency in assessment processes.

== Authorized use ==
It was approved for use in the European Union in 1998. Since then, six countries have grown it (Spain, Portugal, Czech Republic, Slovakia and Romania) and six countries (Austria, Hungary, Greece, France, Luxembourg, and Germany) have banned its cultivation (imports were still allowed) under an emergency temporary provision known as the 'Safeguard Clause' due to concerns that it causes environmental damage.

In Italy its cultivation has been banned since July 12, 2013, when the Italian Health minister required the suspension of the authorization of GM maize's cultivation, in reaction to a scientific report by the Italian Agricultural Research Council (CRA) about the insecticide producing GM maize. In Poland the cultivation of GMO crops has been banned since January 28, 2013.

MON 810 is approved for use in Argentina, Australia, Brazil, Canada, China, Colombia, the European Union (where approval is also required by member states), Japan, Korea, Mexico, the Philippines, South Africa, Switzerland, South Korea, Taiwan, the United States and Uruguay.

On 24 February 2016 an open letter of concern was written to the DG Health and Food Safety (SANTE,)European Commission regarding new invasive species (acclaimed ancestor of cultivated maize, teosinte) in Spain that can outcross with genetically modified maize (MON 810).

== See also ==
- MON 863
