= Séralini affair =

Retracted study led by Gilles-Éric Séralini

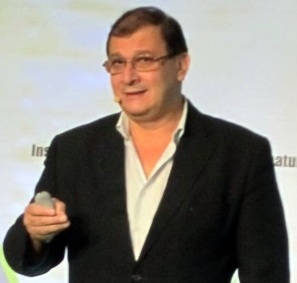
Gilles-Éric Séralini, in 2015

The Séralini affair was the controversy surrounding the publication, retraction, and republication of a journal article by French molecular biologist Gilles-Éric Séralini. First published by Food and Chemical Toxicology in September 2012, the article presented a two-year feeding study in rats, and reported an increase in tumors among rats fed genetically modified corn and the herbicide RoundUp. Scientists and regulatory agencies subsequently concluded that the study's design was flawed and its findings unsubstantiated. A chief criticism was that each part of the study had too few rats to obtain statistically useful data, particularly because the strain of rat used, Sprague Dawley, develops tumors at a high rate over its lifetime.

The publicity surrounding the initial publication of the article also attracted criticism, with science writer Declan Butler calling it "a tightly orchestrated media offensive". As part of a news embargo, Séralini required journalists to sign an unusual confidentiality agreement in exchange for advance access to the article, prohibiting them from conferring with other scientists before the press conference announcing publication. (Note: Agence France-Presse, 20 September 2012: "Breaking with a long tradition in scientific journalism, the authors allowed a selected group of reporters to have access to the paper, provided they signed confidentiality agreements that prevented them from consulting other experts about the research before publication.") At the press conference, Séralini emphasized the study's potential cancer implications, and photographs from the article of treated rats with large tumors were widely circulated by the media. The French Society of Toxicologic Pathology pointed out that, because such tumors are commonly found in older rats, the inclusion in the article of those images from treated rats, without also showing control rats, was misleading. Séralini also released a book and documentary film about the study in conjunction with the press conference.

Following widespread criticism by scientists, Food and Chemical Toxicology retracted the paper in November 2013 after the authors refused to withdraw it. The editor-in-chief said that the article was retracted because its data were inconclusive and its conclusions unreliable. In June 2014 an amended version of the article was republished in Environmental Sciences Europe, and the raw data were made public. According to writer Nathanael Johnson, not all of the raw data were, in fact, released. The journal did not conduct any further peer review; reviewers checked only that the scientific content of the paper had not changed.

== Background ==
Séralini, a professor of molecular biology at the University of Caen, is president of the scientific advisory board of the Committee of Research and Independent Information on Genetic Engineering (CRIIGEN), which opposes genetically modified food (GM food). Séralini co-founded CRIIGEN in 1999 because he judged that studies on GM food safety were inadequate.

Before 2012, Séralini had published other peer-reviewed papers that concluded there were health risks to GM foods. In 2007 he and two others published a Greenpeace-funded study (Séralini 2007). It concluded that MON 863, a corn rootworm-resistant Bt corn developed by Monsanto, caused health problems in rats, including weight changes, triglyceride level increases in females, changes in urine composition in males, and reduced function or organ damage in the liver, kidney, adrenal glands, heart and haematopoietic system. The European Food Safety Authority (EFSA) concluded that all blood chemistry and organ weight values fell within the normal range for control animals, and that the paper had used incorrect statistical methods. The French Commission du Génie Biomoléculaire (AFBV) also criticized the study's conclusions.

In 2009, the Séralini lab published another study (Séralini 2009), which re-analyzed toxicity data for NK 603 (glyphosate resistant), MON 810 and MON 863 strains. The data included three rat-feeding studies published by Monsanto scientists on MON 810. This study concluded that the three crops caused liver, kidney and heart damage in the rats. The EFSA concluded that the authors' claims were not supported by their data, that many of the statistical criticisms of Séralini 2007 applied to Séralini 2009, and that the study included no new information that would change the EFSA's conclusions. The French Haut Conseil des biotechnologies (High Council of Biotechnologies Scientific Committee or HCB) reviewed Séralini 2009 and concluded that it "presents no admissible scientific element likely to ascribe any haematological, hepatic or renal toxicity to the three re-analysed GMOs." The HCB questioned the authors' independence, noting that, in 2010, the "body to which the authors belong" displayed material from a 2008 Austrian anti-GM study, the results of which had been acknowledged as mistaken by the study's authors. Food Standards Australia New Zealand concluded that the results of Séralini 2009 were due to chance alone.

In 2010, Séralini sued Marc Fellous, president of the French Association of Plant Biotechnology, for libel, after Fellous criticized Séralini's research, in part because it was funded by Greenpeace. The judge ruled that the charge about the funding was defamatory. Fellous was fined €1000; Séralini was awarded a symbolic €1 in damages.

A 2011 article by the Séralini lab that reviewed 19 published animal-feeding studies, as well as data from animal-feeding studies submitted for regulatory approval, concluded that GM food had liver and kidney effects that were sex and dose dependent, and advocated for longer and more elaborate toxicology tests for regulatory approval.

== 2012 study ==
=== Study background ===
On 19 September 2012, the journal Food and Chemical Toxicology published a peer-reviewed paper entitled "Long term toxicity of a Roundup herbicide and a Roundup-tolerant genetically modified maize." The two-year toxicity study, which cost €3.2 million, was conducted at the University of Caen by Séralini and seven colleagues. It had been funded by and run with the collaboration of CRIIGEN.

The study used 100 male and 100 female Sprague Dawley rats, divided into twenty groups with 10 rats in each. One male and one female group were each fed one of the following 10 test diets (also referred to in the study as "treatments"):

- Three diets were composed of a mix of standard laboratory rat food and genetically modified corn (NK603) in proportions of 11 percent, 22 percent, and 33 percent
- Three similar diets, in the same proportions, but with NK603 corn which had been treated in the field with Roundup.
- Three diets consisted of a mix of standard laboratory rat food and 33% non-GMO corn, each accompanied with differing concentrations of Roundup in their drinking water
- One diet consisted of a mix of standard laboratory rat food and 33% non-GMO corn, without contaminated drinking water. This served as the "control" diet.

All of the rats were allowed free access to food and water.

The paper's abstract stated: "In females, all treated groups died 2–3 times more than controls, and more rapidly. This difference was visible in 3 male groups fed GMOs. All results were hormone and sex dependent, and the pathological profiles were comparable."

=== Publication strategy ===
Séralini held a press conference on the day the study was released in which he "promoted the cancer results as the study's major finding." At the press conference he also announced the release of a book and film about the study. Selected journalists were given early access to the paper on condition they sign a confidentiality agreement, which meant they were unable to confer with other scientists before the embargo expired. In contrast, embargo guidelines by journals such as Nature allow reporters to check their stories with independent experts. (Note: Nature Geoscience editorial, December 2011: "Giving the media advance notice of upcoming papers and full access to them several days before publication allows reporters time to research a story, and ask independent experts to comment on the full peer-reviewed paper.")

Séralini's approach was widely criticized. A Nature editorial called it "a public-relations offensive." The result of the confidentiality agreement, the journal said, was that critical commentary was absent from the first round of stories, the ones most likely to be remembered. (Note: Nature, September 2012: "With such strong claims and the predictably large effect they will have on public opinion, researchers should take care how they present their findings to the public and the media. They should spell out their results clearly; emphasize the limitations and caveats; and make it clear that the data still need to be assessed, and replicated, by the scientific community. That didn't happen. The paper was promoted in a public-relations offensive, with a related book and film set for release this week. Furthermore, journalists wishing to report the research had to sign confidentiality agreements that prevented them from contacting other scientists for comment on the paper until after the embargo had expired. Some, to their credit, refused, or accepted and then revisited the story critically once their hands were no longer tied by these outrageous restrictions. The result was the exclusion of critical comment in many of the breaking stories — the ones that most people will remember.") The press conference and publication occurred weeks before the vote on California Proposition 37, which called for labeling genetically modified food. The study was cited by supporters of the proposition.

The ethics committee of the French National Centre for Scientific Research wrote that Séralini's public relations approach was "inappropriate for a high-quality and objective scientific debate." Science journalist Carl Zimmer criticized the science journalists who participated. Cosmos Magazine's Elizabeth Finkel said that the confidentiality clause had allowed Séralini's story to "prance unfettered" before second opinions arrived.

== Reception ==
=== Scientific evaluation ===
The study was criticized by various regulatory authorities and scientists. With few exceptions, the scientific community questioned the study and the peer-review process that allowed it to have been published.

Many said that Séralini's conclusions were impossible to justify due to experimental design issues or lack of statistical power of the study. Sprague-Dawley rats have a lifespan of about two years and have a high risk of cancer over their lifespan (one study concluded that over eighty percent of males and over seventy percent of females developed cancer under normal conditions). The Séralini experiment covered the normal lifespan of these rats. The longer an experiment continues, the more rats get cancer naturally, that makes it harder to separate statistical "noise" from the hypothetical signal. For the study to achieve such separation (statistical power), each control and test group would have to include sufficiently many subjects. Organisation for Economic Co-operation and Development (OECD) guidelines recommend 20 rats for chemical-toxicity studies, and 50 rats for carcinogenicity studies. In addition, if the survival of the rats is less than 50% at 104 weeks (which is likely for Sprague-Dawley rats) the recommended number of rats is 65. The Séralini study had only ten per group.

Tom Sanders from King's College London noted a lack of data on amount of food given, and on growth rates, further noting that rats are susceptible to mammary tumors when food intake is not restricted. Sanders said, "The statistical methods are unconventional ... and it would appear the authors have gone on a statistical fishing trip."

The Washington Post quoted Marion Nestle, the Paulette Goddard professor in the Department of Nutrition, Food Studies and Public Health at New York University and food safety advocate: "'[I] can't figure it out yet....It's weirdly complicated and unclear on key issues: what the controls were fed, relative rates of tumors, why no dose relationship, what the mechanism might be. I can't think of a biological reason why GMO corn should do this.....So even though I strongly support labeling, I'm skeptical of this study.'" Likewise, Dan Charles, writing for NPR, noted that in the study, rats that ate 33% GM food developed fewer tumors than did those who ate 11% GM food, suggesting the absence of a dose response. University of Calgary Professor Maurice Moloney publicly wondered why the paper contained so many pictures of treated rats with horrific tumors, but no pictures of control group rats.

Many national food safety and regulatory agencies condemned the paper. The German Federal Institute for Risk Assessment VP Reiner Wittkowski said in a statement, "The study shows both shortcomings in study design and in the presentation of the collected data. This means that the conclusions drawn by the authors are not supported by the available data." A joint report by three Canadian regulatory agencies also "identified significant shortcomings in the study design, implementation and reporting." Similar conclusions were reached by the French HCB and the National Agency for Food Safety, the Vlaams Instituut voor Biotechnologie, the Technical University of Denmark, Food Standards Australia New Zealand, the Brazilian National Technical Commission on Biosafety, and EFSA. EFSA concluded:

The study as reported by Séralini et al. was found to be inadequately designed, analysed and reported...The study as described by Séralini et al. does not allow giving weight to their results and conclusions as published. Conclusions cannot be drawn on the difference in tumour incidence between treatment groups on the basis of the design, the analysis and the results as reported. Taking into consideration Member States' assessments and the authors' answer to critics, EFSA finds that the study as reported by Séralini et al. is of insufficient scientific quality for safety assessments.

The European Federation of Biotechnology industry association, which counts Monsanto and other biotech firms among its members, called for the paper to be retracted, calling its publication a "dangerous failure of the peer-review system." Six French national academies (of Agriculture, Medicine, Pharmacy, Science, Technology and Veterinarians) issued a joint statement – "an extremely rare event in French science" – condemning the study and the journal that published it. The joint statement dismissed the study as 'a scientific non-event'. FCT, an Elsevier imprint, has a peer review process, and at least three scientists reviewed the paper prior to publication. The journal published a statement in their November 2012 issue, that "the Editors have encouraged those people with concerns to write formally to the Editor-in-Chief, so that their views can be publicly aired."

In March 2013 FCT published a letter from Erio Barale-Thomas, principal scientist of Johnson & Johnson Pharmaceutical Research and Development and the president of the Conseil d'Administration of The Société Française de Pathologie Toxicologique (SFPT, French Society of Toxicologic Pathology). SFPT is "a non governmental/non profit organization formed by veterinarians, physicians, pharmacists and biologists specialized in veterinary and toxicologic pathology. Its aim is to promote knowledge in pathology, toxicology and laboratory animal sciences for safety studies of drugs, chemicals and food products, and the role of the pathologist in the study design and data interpretation." The letter criticized the Seralini study on several fronts, and concluded: "However, given this study presents serious deficiencies in the protocol, the procedures and the interpretation of the results, the SFPT cannot support any of the scientific claims drawn by the authors, and any relevance for human risk assessment. This letter presents the consensus scientific opinion of the Conseil d'Administration of the SFPT."

The Belgian federal minister of public health asked the Belgian Biosafety Advisory Council (BBAC) to evaluate the paper. The BBAC was asked to "inform the Minister whether this paper (i) contains new scientific information with regard to risks for human health of GM maize NK603 and (ii) whether this information triggers a revision of the current authorisation for commercialisation for food and feed use of this GM maize in the European Union (EU)." The BBAC committee, whose members are drawn from the Belgian biotech Professoriat, pointed out that "the long duration of this study is a positive aspect since most of the toxicity studies on GMOs are performed on shorter periods," and concluded that:

"Given the shortcomings identified by the experts regarding the experimental design, the statistical analysis, the interpretation of the results, the redaction of the article and the presentation of the results, the Biosafety Advisory Council concludes that this study does not contain new scientifically relevant elements that may lead to reconsider immediately the current authorisation for food and feed use of GM maize NK603. Considering the issues raised by the study (i.e. long term assessment), the Biosafety Advisory Council proposes EFSA urgently to study in depth the relevance of the actual guidelines and procedures. It can find inspiration in the GRACE project to find useful information and new concerted ideas."

The study was also criticized by the European Society of Toxicologic Pathology, which expressed shock at the way the rats in the study were treated and questioned whether the study was legal to perform under European law.

A 2015 reanalysis of multiple animal studies found that Seralini chose to forgo statistical tests in the main conclusions of the study. Using Seralini's published numerical data, the review found no significant effects on animal health after analysis with statistical tests. The finding that "in females, all the treated groups died 2–3 times more than controls" was not statistically significant. The highest mortality was observed for the group of female rats fed 22% genetically modified maize. This difference was not statistically significant. Seralini also originally claimed males in groups fed 22% and 33% genetically modified maize had three times lower mortality than controls, but this was also not statistically significant. The findings of liver necrosis and mammary tumors were also not significant.

A 2017 study found that since it was retracted, Seralini et al. (2012) had been cited 60 times after it was retracted, and that more of these citations were negative (39%) than were positive (26%).

=== Responses to criticism ===
Séralini and supporters defended the study design, the interpretation of the results, and manner and content of the publication. Support for the study came from the European Network of Scientists for Social and Environmental Responsibility (ENSSER), of which CRIIGEN is a member. A subsequent study published in 2013 by ENSSER concluded that EFSA (European Food Safety Authority) applied double standards in evaluation of feeding studies, criticized EFSA's applied criteria.

Séralini responded to criticisms of his methodology (and specifically a lack of difference between rodent groups at higher doses) with a July 2015 paper in PLOS ONE claiming that all laboratory rodent diets are contaminated with "dangerous" levels of GMOs. This has been strongly criticised by numerous experts, for example, Tamara Galloway said that the study "speculates beyond the evidence presented in this paper".

Other Séralini supporters criticized the retraction of the study, concluding the response was a product of industry-driven campaign and regard this as a concerning example of industry interference in the scientific process.

=== Officials ===
At the time of the initial release, French Prime Minister Jean-Marc Ayrault said that, if the results are confirmed, the government would press for a Europe-wide ban on the maize and The European Commission instructed the EFSA in Parma, Italy, to assess the study. In late September 2012, Russia temporarily suspended importing GM corn as a result of the study and in November 2012, Kenya banned all GM crops. In 2022, Kenya reversed the ban in its entirety.

=== Media ===
The press conference led to widespread negative media coverage for GM food, especially in Europe. Le Nouvel Observateur covered the press conference in a story called, "Yes, GMOs are poisons!".

Jon Entine in Forbes stated, "Seralini's research is anomalous. Previous peer-reviewed rat feeding studies using the same products (NK603 and Roundup) have not found any negative food safety impacts. The Japanese Department of Environmental Health and Toxicology released a 52-week feeding study of GM soybeans in 2007, finding "no apparent adverse effect in rats." In 2012, a team of scientists at the University of Nottingham School of Biosciences released a review of 12 long-term studies (up to two years) and 12 multi-generational studies (up to 5 generations) of GM foods, concluding there is no evidence of health hazards." Andrew Revkin wrote in a blog the study was another instance of "single-study syndrome", and that the study was in support of an "agenda".

Henry I. Miller, in an opinion piece for Forbes, said "[Seralini] has crossed the line from merely performing and reporting flawed experiments to committing gross scientific misconduct and attempting fraud." Séralini responded by saying, "...that he won't make any data available to the EFSA and the BfR until the EFSA makes public all the data under-pinning its 2003 approval of NK603 maize for human consumption and animal feed."

The Guardian's Environmental Blog stated that the study linking GM maize to cancer "must be taken seriously by regulators" and that although it "attracted a torrent of abuse", "it cannot be swept under the carpet". They also noted CRIIGEN's funding of the research and reported Séralini's response: namely, that studies in support of GM food are usually funded by "corporates or by pro-biotech institutions". Proponents of California's GM labeling referendum, Proposition 37, hailed the study.

A statement about the controversy, and especially the attacks on Seralini, was published in Le Monde, signed by 140 French scientists; the letter said:

"...the protocol followed in this study presents problems that are subject to debate within the scientific community. ...

We are deeply shocked by the image of our community that this controversy gives citizens. The discipline of risks to human health and the environment is a difficult activity which is done in the face of many uncertainties. Many of the threats to our planet have been revealed by individual scientists and then confirmed by many studies by the scientific community. In this case, it would be more effective to implement research on the health and environmental risks of GMOs and pesticides, improve toxicological protocols used before entry into the market, and finance a variety of researchers in this field than to create clashes between two camps fed on prejudices and ideologies. We think our community should remember past mistakes..."

=== Lawsuit ===
In 2012 Séralini sued the editor of Marianne and journalist Jean-Claude Jaillet for defamation after they accused him of fraud. The High Court of Paris ruled in Seralini's favor in 2015. The court said that the fraud allegation had first been made by Henry I. Miller in Forbes. The journalist was fined a total of 3,500 euros, while the editor was fined twice that amount because of past convictions.

== Retraction ==
In November 2013, Elsevier announced that FCT was retracting the paper, after the authors refused to withdraw it. The journal's editors concluded that while there was "no evidence of fraud or intentional misrepresentation of the data", the results were inconclusive and "[did] not reach the threshold of publication for Food and Chemical Toxicology". After an in-depth look at the study's raw data, no definitive conclusions could be reached regarding the role of either NK603 or glyphosate in overall mortality or tumor rates, given the high incidence of tumors in Sprague-Dawley rats and the small sample size. Normal variance could not be excluded as the cause of the results. Following many enquiries about the retraction, FCT's editor-in-chief said that:

The retraction statement could have been clearer, and should have referred to the relevant COPE guidelines. The data are inconclusive, therefore the claim (i.e., conclusion) that Roundup Ready maize NK603 and/or the Roundup herbicide have a link to cancer is unreliable. Dr. Séralini deserves the benefit of the doubt that this unreliable conclusion was reached in honest error. The review of the data made it clear that there was no misconduct. However, to be very clear, it is the entire paper, with the claim that there is a definitive link between GMO and cancer that is being retracted. Dr. Séralini has been very vocal that he believes his conclusions are correct. In our analysis, his conclusions cannot be claimed from the data presented in this article.

— A. Wallace Hayes, Editor-in-Chief of Food and Chemical Toxicology answers questions on retraction

Séralini and his supporters strongly objected to the retraction, and Séralini himself threatened to sue FCT. A bioethicist with the NIH examined the case and wrote in the Journal of Agricultural and Environmental Ethics that articles should not be retracted for inconclusiveness, but that retraction due to flaws in study design or due to ethical violations may be appropriate, and that republication of retracted papers should occur only after additional peer review.

On 1 August 2017, as part of a lawsuit against Monsanto, documents were released showing, among other things, that the editor-in-chief, Wallace Hayes, had once had a contractual relationship with Monsanto. Hayes said in an interview that he did not have a contract with Monsanto when he retracted Séralini's paper, and that his decision to retract it was not influenced by Monsanto at all.

== Republication ==
In June 2014, the original study was republished with the addition of the entire data set, in the journal Environmental Sciences Europe. The entire data set was published because of requests from the national regulatory bodies CFIA, EFSA, FSANZ, ANSES and BfR.

The editor said that the paper was republished without further scientific peer review, "because this had already been conducted by Food and Chemical Toxicology, and had concluded there had been no fraud nor misrepresentation." The republication renewed the controversy, but now with additional controversy over the behavior of the editors of both journals.

In July 2015, the International Agency for Research on Cancer published a monograph on glyphosate, which contained an evaluation of the Séralini paper as republished in June 2014 and the conclusion, that the study "was inadequate for evaluation because the number of animals per group was small, the histopathological description of tumours was poor, and incidences of tumours for individual animals were not provided."

== See also ==
- Pusztai affair
