= Gilles-Éric Séralini =

French molecular biologist, political advisor and activist

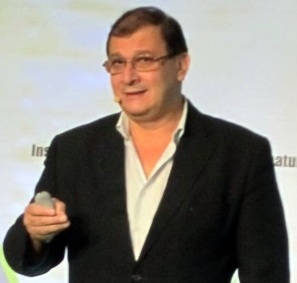
- Gilles-Éric Séralini in 2015
- Born: 23 August 1960 (age 66); Bône, French Algeria
- Education: University of Montpellier II
- Known for: Séralini affair
- Spouse: Soline Séralini
- Children: Two
- Awards: Knight of the National Order of Merit, Denis Guichard prize, Theo Colborn Award, whistleblower award, International Scientist of the Year.
- Scientific career
- Fields: Endocrinology
- Workplaces: University of Caen
- Thesis: Rôle inhibiteur de l'alphafoetoprotéine sur la fonction génitale du rat (1987)

Gilles-Éric Séralini (born 23 August 1960) is a French molecular biologist, political advisor and activist on genetically modified organisms and foods. He is of Algerian-French origin. Séralini has been a professor of molecular biology at the University of Caen since 1991, and is president and chairman of the board of CRIIGEN.

His work and publication strategies on GMOs have been controversial. A paper he published in 2012 attracted major controversy and was retracted by the journal.

== Early life ==
Séralini was born on 23 August 1960 in Bône, Algeria, during the Algerian War of Independence. His father was a telecommunications technician and his mother was a schoolteacher. His family soon settled in Thonon-les-Bains, Haute-Savoie, and then Nice.

== Career ==
In 1987, Séralini obtained his doctoral degree from the University of Montpellier II. He then did four years of research at, among other places, the University of Western Ontario and Laval University Medical Center. Séralini underwent research on corticosteroid-binding globulin, before being appointed a professor at the University of Caen in June 1991, a position he has held ever since. The general area of his lab's research focuses on the endocrine system, in particular the enzyme aromatase. His lab has synthesized a number of aromatase inhibitors using equine aromatase as a model. His research has been published in the Journal of Histochemistry & Cytochemistry, the Journal of Steroid Biochemistry and Molecular Biology, and Molecular and Cellular Endocrinology.

In 1997, he became interested in genetically modified organisms, publicly appealing for the precautionary principle to be followed. He was appointed to various government posts, including roles in the French government, the European Union and the European Commission. From 1998 till 2007 Séralini was a member of the French Biomolecular Engineering Commission which was tasked with evaluating GMO allowances for both the French Ministry of Agriculture and Ministry of the Environment.

=== CRIIGEN ===
Séralini founded the Committee of Research and Independent Information on Genetic Engineering (CRIIGEN) with Corine Lepage, a former politician, and Pierre-Henri Gouyon, a professor from the Muséum national d'histoire naturelle, in 1999. CRIIGEN is publicly opposed to genetically modified food (GM food). Séralini founded CRIIGEN because he judged that studies on GM food safety were inadequate, and questioned their acceptance.

In 2007, Séralini and two other authors from the University of Caen and the University of Rouen published a Greenpeace-funded paper using data obtained from rat feeding studies conducted by Monsanto in 2004. They concluded that the genetically modified maize used, MON 863, resulted in significant variations compared to the control rats’ weight, triglyceride levels and urine composition. They also concluded it effected the liver, kidney, adrenal glands, heart, and haematopoietic system and recommended that safety experiments continue beyond 90 days. Greenpeace cited the study in a press release calling for MON 863's recall and a review of testing methods.

The paper prompted the European Food Safety Authority (EFSA) to reexamine the MON 863 safety data. It asked EU countries for any new data about the strain, new opinions on the original Monsanto study and a technical meeting with the authors of the 2007 CRIIGEN paper. The EFSA concluded that all blood chemistry and organ weight values fell within the normal range for the control animals in question and that the Séralini paper used incorrect statistical methods. In 2010 Markos Kyprianou (European Commissioner for Health and Consumer Policy) confirmed the doubts in a report to the European Parliament. The French Commission du Génie Biomoléculaire (AFBV) also reached critical conclusions. "Food Standards Australia New Zealand attributed the differences between rats fed MON 863 corn and control rats to normal biological variation (for the species in question)."

In 2009, the Séralini lab published another study, which re-analyzed toxicity data for glyphosate resistant, MON 810 and MON 863 strains, concluded that they showed liver, kidney and heart damages in the rats. EFSA found no base for the claims and saw many of the statistical criticisms of the 2007 paper applying to the 2009 paper also. The French High Council of Biotechnologies Scientific Committee (HCB) concluded that Séralini 2009 "..presents no admissible scientific element likely to ascribe any haematological, hepatic or renal toxicity to the three re-analysed GMOs." Food Standards Australia New Zealand had a similar result. The HCB also questioned the authors' independence.

A 2011 review by Séralini, using data from 19 published animal feeding studies and several animal feeding studies submitted for regulatory approval, continued to conclude that GM food had liver and kidney effects, and advocated for longer and more elaborate toxicology tests for regulatory approval.

=== 2012 paper ===
On 19 September 2012, Séralini and his colleagues published a peer-reviewed paper funded by CRIIGEN titled "Long-term toxicity of a Roundup herbicide and a Roundup-tolerant genetically modified maize" in Food and Chemical Toxicology (FCT). It involved a two-year study of genetically modified corn and the herbicide RoundUp fed to rats. At a press conference announcing his paper, Séralini emphasized the study's potential cancer implications. Photographs from the journal article of treated rats with large tumors were widely circulated in the press. In November 2013, the FCT editors retracted the paper, with the editor-in-chief saying that its results were inconclusive. In June 2014 the text of the article was republished in Environmental Sciences Europe.

With a few exceptions, the scientific community dismissed the Séralini study and called for a more rigorous peer-review system in scientific journals.

After Séralini published his 2012 corn study in parallel with a book and a documentary called Tous Cobayes !, various French Academies wrote a common bulletin expressing a number of concerns related to the study. The bulletin criticizes the science behind the study, questions the ethics of the study's authors and the standards of the publishing journal (Food and Chemical Toxicology), and states concern over the social consequences of what the bulletin's authors perceive to be scaremongering in the area of GMOs. Signatories of the bulletin included the Académie d'agriculture de France, Académie nationale de médecine, Académie nationale de pharmacie, Académie des sciences, Académie des technologies and Académie vétérinaire de France.

=== Recent work ===
In May 2013, shortly before a debate was scheduled to take place on the topic of genetically modified foods, held by the libertarian think tank Cato Institute, both Séralini and consumer activist Jeffrey M. Smith withdrew from the debate. Smith disapproved of the planned inclusion of molecular biologist Kevin Folta and Séralini accused Jon Entine, who organized the debate's panel, of libel.

In 2014, Séralini et al. published a study claiming that pesticides were more toxic than regulatory bodies had previously thought. The study prompted Ralf Reski, one of the editors of BioMed Research International, the journal in which it was published, to resign. Reski said, "I do not want to be connected to a journal that provides [Séralini] a forum for such kind of agitation."

Various journalists criticized Séralini's strategy towards the public, since he asked media to sign non-disclosure agreements before the publishing and tried to interdict requests to other scientists. The publication strategy overall has been deemed flawed and questionable again, as it connected allegedly flawed scientific studies, various publications, books and films in parallel while trying to silence scientific and public debate in a broad political campaign of questionable value.

A 2016 paper published by Seralini claims homeopathic remedies protect against acute glyphosate intake alleged toxicity. This claim is without any scientific basis or evidence. A strong consensus prevails among the scientific community that homeopathy is a pseudo-scientific, unethical and implausible line of treatment.

== Supporters and funding ==
Gilles-Eric Séralini has published various studies and a book Nous pouvons nous dépolluer (We are able to detox ourselves, 2009) claiming certain plant based pharmaceuticals based on homeopathy were being able to decrease poisonous influences. The related lab received funding from Sevene Pharma to study the detoxifying capacity of their plant extracts on Roundup residues, bisphenol A and atrazine. Séralini participated and received payment for a lecture in a two-day seminar organized by Sevene Pharma.

In 2010, Séralini sued University of Paris VII Marc Fellous, president of the French Association of Plant Biotechnology and the Association, for libel, claiming that they had unjustly criticized his scientific ability and his research because of its funder, Greenpeace. The judge ruled that because Fellous and other critics had financial ties to the agricultural biotechnology industry, their charge about the Greenpeace funding was defamatory, but refused to rule on the scientific matter. Fellous was fined 1000 euros. Séralini was awarded a symbolic 1 euro in damages and court costs.

== Awards and honors ==
- Chevalier de l'ordre national du Mérite, from the French government, for his whole career in the field of biology.
- In 2015 Séralini was awarded the "whistleblower" award by the Federation of German Scientists and the German branch of the International Association of Lawyers Against Nuclear Arms ILANA.
- In January 2002, he received the 2001 Denis Guichard Prize "for his work and expertise on GMOs and his activities in favor of an ethical and independent scientific evaluation".
- In February 2012, he was awarded the prize of "International Scientist of the Year 2011", by the Cambridge International Biographical Center, "for his extensive research on the effects of GMOs and pesticides on health ".
- In March 2016, he received the Theo Colborn Award at the San Diego Symposium on Environmental Health in the United States.

== Selected publications ==
=== Scientific papers ===
- Almadhidi J, Seralini GE, Fresnel J, Silberzahn P, Gaillard JL (June 1995). "Immunohistochemical localization of cytochrome P450 aromatase in equine gonads". The Journal of Histochemistry and Cytochemistry. 43 (6): 571–7. doi:10.1177/43.6.7769228. PMID 7769228.
- Le Curieux-Belfond O, Moslemi S, Mathieu M, Séralini GE (October 2001). "Androgen metabolism in oyster Crassostrea gigas: evidence for 17beta-HSD activities and characterization of an aromatase-like activity inhibited by pharmacological compounds and a marine pollutant". The Journal of Steroid Biochemistry and Molecular Biology. 78 (4): 359–66. doi:10.1016/S0960-0760(01)00109-1. PMID 11717006. S2CID 8628104.
- Lemazurier E, Sourdaine P, Nativelle C, Plainfossé B, Séralini G (June 2001). "Aromatase gene expression in the stallion". Molecular and Cellular Endocrinology. 178 (1–2): 133–9. doi:10.1016/S0303-7207(01)00435-X. PMID 11403902. S2CID 23931377.
- Mesnage R, Defarge N, Rocque LM, Spiroux de Vendômois J, Séralini GE (2015). "Laboratory Rodent Diets Contain Toxic Levels of Environmental Contaminants: Implications for Regulatory Tests". PLOS ONE. 10 (7) e0128429. Bibcode:2015PLoSO..1028429M. doi:10.1371/journal.pone.0128429. PMC 4489719. PMID 26133768.
- Mesnage R, Arno M, Costanzo M, Malatesta M, Séralini GE, Antoniou MN (August 2015). "Transcriptome profile analysis reflects rat liver and kidney damage following chronic ultra-low dose Roundup exposure". Environmental Health. 14 (1) 70. Bibcode:2015EnvHe..14...70M. doi:10.1186/s12940-015-0056-1. PMC 4549093. PMID 26302742.

=== Books ===
- Séralini GÉ (2004). Ces OGM qui changent le monde. Flammarion Publishing. ISBN 2-08-080062-0.
- Séralini GÉ (2006). Après nous le déluge ?. Flammarion Publishing. ISBN 2-08-210549-0.
