= European Network of Scientists for Social and Environmental Responsibility =

- Formation: 2009
- Type: Non-governmental organization
- Purpose: Environmentalism
- Headquarters: Berlin, Germany
- Chairperson: Angelika Hilbeck
- Deputy Chairperson: Christian Vélot
- Main organ: Board of Directors
- Website: www.ensser.org

The European Network of Scientists for Social and Environmental Responsibility (ENSSER), is an international non-profit group of scientists, academics and physicians, founded in 2009. ENSSER organizes conferences on a variety of topics, with participants from governmental institutions, Universities and organisations.

== Activities ==
According to the official website, ENSSER brings together independent scientific expertise to develop public-good knowledge for the critical assessment of existing and emerging technologies. The group has been described as a participant in "disputes about the regulation of GM crops". Commentators have observed that the ENSSER "jumped into the middle" of the GMO debate by "pointing out that there is no scientific consensus on the safety of GMOs". However, other commentators have described the group's publications as the "disingenuous" work of "anti-biotech luminaries". In 2013, the ENSSER defended Gilles-Eric Seralini after his study linking genetically modified food to cancer was retracted.

== Members ==
ENSSER members include Hans Rudolf Herren, winner of the 1995 World Food Prize and the 2013 Right Livelihood Award, Angela Hilbeck, senior scientist at the Institute of Integrative Biology at the Swiss Federal Institute of Technology. David Schubert, Professor and Director of cellular neurobiology at The Salk Institute for Biological Studies, and Brian Wynne, Professor of Science Studies and Research Director of the Centre for the Study of Environmental Change (CSEC) at the University of Lancaster.
