= Ernst Berliner =

German scientist (1880–1957)

- Born: September 15, 1880; Berlin, Germany
- Died: October 1, 1957 (aged 77)
- Occupation: Scientist
- Notable work: Contributions to microbiology, entomology, and biochemistry.

Ernst Berliner (15 September 1880 – 1 October 1957) was a German scientist with contributions to microbiology, entomology, and biochemistry.

== Life and career ==
Ernst Berliner was born in Berlin to Albrecht Berliner and Hedwig (née Koppen). He attended the Humboldt Gymnasium, which he left in 1901 with his Abitur. From 1900 to 1904 he studied engineering at the Technische Hochschule in Berlin (now Technische Universität Berlin) following which he studied natural sciences at the Frederick William University (now the Humboldt University of Berlin) until 1908, with Oscar Hertwig, Rudolf Virchow (?), Ludwig Plate, Warburg, Fritz Schaudinn, Max Hartmann, Franz Eilhard Schulze, and Wilhelm von Branca. Afterwards he was active scientifically at the Zoological Institute of the University and the Robert Koch Institute. On 8 May 1909 he received a Dr. phil. with a thesis on flagellates.

From 1909 to 1912 he worked at the Research Institute for Cereal Processing in Berlin as an assistant to Johannes Buchwald and later as department director. Here he studied an infectious disease of flour moth caterpillars, which he named Bacillus thuringiensis. In the summer of 1909, a shipment arrived from a Thuringian mill containing diseased caterpillars, after which an epidemic spread in the institute. In 1911, he first reported their findings in the Zeitschrift für Getreidewesen (Journal of Cereal) which he followed in 1915 with the detailed publication "Über die Schlaffsucht der Mehlmottenraupe (Ephestia kühniella Zell.) und ihren Erreger Bacillus thuringiensis" ("On the Somnolence of flour moth caterpillars (Ephestia kühniella sp.) and their pathogen Bacillus thuringiensis") in the Zeitschrift für angewandte Entomologie (Journal of Applied Entomology).

From 1912 to 1914 he was head of the agrochemical control station of the chamber of agriculture for Halle, Saxony-Anhalt. He volunteered after the outbreak of the First World War and served as a lieutenant and company commander in France and Russia, for which he was awarded the Iron Cross 2nd and 1st class.

From 1920 he was senior chemist at the Swedish milling company Malmö Stora Walskvarn and from 1927 Director of the Research Institute for Cereal Chemistry at MIAG in Frankfurt.

In 1921, he married Helene Martha Ast (died 1954). They had two children: Kurt Albrecht (1921-1944) and Hildur Hedwig (born 1928).

In 1931 he founded the independent Research Institute for Cereal Chemistry in Darmstadt-Eberstadt. From 1927 to 1933, he was Associate Professor of Cereal Chemistry at the Technical University of Darmstadt.

During the Nazi era, Berliner was subject to racial and political persecution, including restrictions on his work and prohibitions on publication. From 1936 to 1938, he was able to conduct scientific training courses in Vienna, Prague, Zurich and Paris. In 1944, he and his wife were temporarily detained by the Gestapo.

From 1949 to 1957 with Kurt Neitzert (born 1911) he organized a working group within the Research Institute for Cereal Chemistry in Darmstadt-Eberstadt. In 1950 he initiated the annual Jugenheimer discussion session of the Association of Cereal Chemistry. In 1955, he was awarded the Cross of the Order of Merit (Verdienstkreuz am Bande).

== Literature ==
- Aloysius Krieg, A. M. Huger: Symposium in memoriam Dr. Ernst Berliner, on the occasion of the 75th anniversary of the first description of Bacillus thuringiensis. Darmstadt, 25. August 1986. Proceedings of the Federal Biological Research Centre for Agriculture and Forestry, Volume 233; ISBN 3-489-23300-X
