= MON 863 =

Variety of maize

MON 863 is a genetically engineered variety of maize produced by Monsanto. It is genetically altered to express a modified version of Cry3Bb1, a delta endotoxin which originates from Bacillus thuringiensis. This protects the plant from corn rootworm. Unlike MON 810, Bt 11, and Bt 176 which each produce a modified Cry1Ab, MON 863 instead produces a modified Cry3Bb1 toxin and contains nptII, a marker gene for antibiotic resistance.

== History ==
In 2004, Monsanto sought approval in Europe to introduce MON 863. Approval was granted in 2005 for use in feed and in 2006 for use in food. There was controversy over acceptance by regulatory bodies of industry-funded toxicity studies and over the design of those studies led by Pr Gilles-Éric Séralini, who was on the committee that reviewed MON863 for the French government.

See Genetically modified food controversies for details of this controversy, which extended beyond MON 863.

Following legal action by parties including the Swedish Board of Agriculture and Greenpeace, a Münster appeals court ruled that Monsanto would be forced to publicly reveal its research data.

== Legal status ==
As of 2015, MON 863 is approved for cultivation in three countries: the United States, Japan, and Canada. The corn is approved for use in Australia, Canada, China, the European Union, Japan, Mexico, New Zealand, Russia, Singapore, South Korea, Taiwan, and the United States.

== See also ==
- MON 810
