= Science by press conference =

Aspect of science news

Science by press conference or science by press release is the practice by which scientists put an unusual focus on publicizing results of research in the news media via press conferences or press releases. The term is usually used disparagingly, to suggest that the seekers of publicity are promoting claims of questionable scientific merit, using the media for attention as they are unlikely to win the approval of the scientific community.

Premature publicity violates a cultural value of most of the scientific community, which is that findings should be subjected to independent review with a "thorough examination by the scientific community" before they are widely publicized. The standard practice is to publish a paper in a peer-reviewed scientific journal. This idea has many merits, including that the scientific community has a responsibility to conduct itself in a deliberative, non-attention seeking way; and that its members should be oriented more towards the pursuit of insight than fame. Science by press conference in its most egregious forms can be undertaken on behalf of an individual researcher seeking fame, a corporation seeking to sway public opinion or investor perception, or a political or ideological movement.

== Etymology ==
The phrase was coined by Spyros Andreopoulos, a public affairs officer at Stanford University Medical School, in a 1980 letter which appeared in the New England Journal of Medicine. Andreopoulos was commenting specifically on the publicity practices of biotechnology startups, including Biogen and Genentech. The journal in which it appeared had implemented a long-standing policy under editor Franz J. Ingelfinger which prohibited seeking publicity for research prior to its submission or publication, informally called the Ingelfinger Rule.

== Notable examples ==
- In 1989, chemists Stanley Pons and Martin Fleischmann held a press conference to claim they had successfully achieved cold fusion. (Highlighting the complexity of defining the term, Pons and Fleischman technically had an accepted paper in press at a peer-reviewed journal at the time of their press conference, though that was not widely acknowledged at the time, and the quality of the paper and its review were later criticized.)
- In 1998, Andrew Wakefield held a press conference to claim that the MMR vaccine caused autism. In January 2011, an article by Brian Deer and its accompanying editorial in BMJ identified Wakefield's work as an "elaborate fraud".
- In 2002, a group called Clonaid held a press conference to announce they had successfully achieved human cloning.
- In 2005, the European Ramazzini Foundation of Oncology and Environmental Sciences (ERF) reported their findings from testing aspartame on rats. Their studies were widely criticized and later discounted.
- In September 2012, Gilles-Éric Séralini held a press conference to claim that genetically modified food caused terrible cancers in rats, on the eve of the publication of a scientific paper, a book publication, and a movie release, and in the runup to the vote on California Proposition 37, a GM food-labeling initiative. As the Séralini affair unfolded, it was revealed that Séralini required journalists to sign confidentiality agreements in order to receive pre-prints of the paper, to prevent them from discussing the paper with independent scientists. The scientific paper was retracted in 2013.

These cases became notorious examples of "science by press conference" precisely because they were widely reported in the press, but were later rebuffed, debunked, or found to be outright fraud.

== Motivations ==
Competition for publicity, between scientific institutions or just individual researchers, is considered a driving force behind premature press conferences. Pressure to announce research findings quickly enough to "avoid losing credit" for any scientific advances may be enhanced by limited or highly competitive funding.

Science by press conference does not have to involve a groundbreaking announcement. A manufacturer may desire to publicize results of research that suggest their product is safe. Science by press conference does not necessarily have to be directed at the general public. In some cases, it may be directed at a target market such as opinion leaders, a specific industry, potential investors, or a specific group of consumers. Biotechnology companies, for example, have financial incentives to utilize premature press conferences to gain favorable media coverage.

In recent years, sociologists of science have recast discussion about "science by press conference". They point to the increasing presence of media conversation across all aspects of culture, and argue that science is subject to many of the same social forces as other aspects of culture. They have described the increased "medialization" of science, and suggest that both science and society are changed by this process.

== Responsibility ==
While the phrase tends to criticize scientists involved in creating the publicity, it has also been used to assert that the media bear responsibility in many instances. Even well-intentioned scientists can sometimes unintentionally create truth-distorting media firestorms because of journalists' difficulty in remaining critical and balanced, the media's interest in controversy, and the general tendency of science reporting to focus on apparent "groundbreaking findings" rather than on the larger context of a research field. Further, when results are released with great fanfare and limited peer review, basic journalism skills require skepticism and further investigation, the frequent lack of which can be seen as a problem with the media as much as with scientists who seek to exploit their power.

Common examples of science by press conference are media reports that a certain product or activity affects health or safety. For instance, the media frequently report findings that a certain food causes or prevents a disease. These reports sometimes contradict earlier reports. In some cases, it is later learned that a group interested in influencing opinion had a hand in publicizing a specific report.

The phrase also condemns different behavior in different fields. For instance, scientists working in fields that put an emphasis on the value of fast dissemination of research, such as HIV treatment research, often first and most visibly disseminate research results via conferences or talks rather than through printed publication. In these areas of science, printed publication occurs later in the process of dissemination of results than in some other fields. In the case of HIV, this is partly the result of AIDS activism in which people with AIDS and their allies criticized the slow pace of research. In particular, they characterized researchers who kept quiet before publication as being more interested in their careers than in the well-being of people with AIDS. On the other hand, over-hyped early findings can inspire activists' ire and even their direct and critical use of the phrase "science by press conference". AIDS denialist groups have claimed that press conferences announcing findings in HIV and AIDS research, particularly Robert Gallo's April 23, 1984, announcement of the discovery of the probable AIDS virus, inhibited research into non-HIV etiologies of AIDS.

Similarly, clinical trials and other kinds of important medical research may release preliminary results to the media before a journal article is printed. In this case, the justification can be that clinicians and patients will benefit from the information even knowing that the data are preliminary and require further review. For instance, researchers did not wait to publish journal articles about the SARS outbreak before notifying the media about many of their findings, for obvious reasons.

Another example might be the termination of a clinical trial because it has yielded early benefit. Publicizing this kind of result has obvious value; a delay of a few months might have terrible consequences when the results concern life-threatening conditions. On the other hand, the latter practice is especially vulnerable to abuse for self-serving ends and thus has drawn criticism similar to that implied by the phrase "science by press conference".

These examples illustrate that the derision in the term "science by press conference" does not necessarily reflect an absolute rule to publish before publicizing. Rather, it illustrates the value that publicity should be a byproduct of science rather than its objective.

== See also ==
- Fringe science
- Hype in science
- Medical journalism
- Science journalism
- Predatory publishing
