= Food and Chemical Toxicology =

- Discipline: Toxicology
- Language: English
- Edited by: Matthew Wright

Publication details
- Former names: Food and Cosmetics Toxicology
- History: 1963–present
- Publisher: Elsevier
- Frequency: Monthly
- Impact factor: 4.6 (2019)

Standard abbreviations
- ISO 4: Food Chem. Toxicol.

Indexing
- CODEN: FCTOD7
- ISSN: 0278-6915
- LCCN: 82643214
- OCLC no.: 67270973

Links
- Journal homepage; Online archive

Food and Chemical Toxicology is a peer-reviewed scientific journal covering aspects of food safety, chemical safety, and other aspects of consumer product safety. It is published by Elsevier and was established in 1963. The editor-in-chief is Matthew Wright.

== Abstracting and indexing ==
The journal is abstracted and indexed in Analytical Abstracts, BIOSIS Previews, CAB International, Chemical Abstracts Service, Current Contents/Agriculture, Biology & Environmental Sciences, Current Contents/Life Sciences, Elsevier BIOBASE, EMBASE, MEDLINE/PubMed, Science Citation Index, and Scopus. According to the Journal Citation Reports, it has a 2014 impact factor of 2.895, ranking it 30th out of 87 journals in the category "Toxicology" and 14th out of 123 journals in the category "Food Science & Technology".

== Controversies ==
In September 2012 F&CT was the original journal which published the paper in question in the Séralini affair. In November 2013 the publisher (Elsevier) then retracted it, however, only for it to be republished by Environmental Sciences Europe in June 2014.

In 2022, after a call from the editor for articles on alleged adverse effects of the COVID-19 vaccine, Seneff et al. published a paper alleging various mechanisms for various diseases that the authors intend to link to COVID-19 vaccination. Several scientists have warned of the biases and shortcomings that this article contains.
