= Environmental Sciences Europe =

- Discipline: Environmental science
- Language: English
- Edited by: Henner Hollert

Publication details
- Former name: Umweltwissenschaften und Schadstoff-Forschung
- History: 1989-present
- Publisher: Springer Science+Business Media
- Frequency: Upon acceptance
- Open access: Yes
- License: Creative Commons by Attribution
- Impact factor: 5.481 (2021)

Standard abbreviations
- ISO 4: Environ. Sci. Eur.

Indexing
- CODEN: USZOE9
- ISSN: 2190-4707 (print); 2190-4715 (web)
- LCCN: 92640116
- OCLC no.: 855185629

Links
- Journal homepage; Online access; Online archive

Environmental Sciences Europe is a peer-reviewed scientific journal covering all aspects of environmental science. It was established in 1989 as Umweltwissenschaften und Schadstoff-Forschung (German for Environmental Science and Pollution Research), obtaining its current name in 2011. It is published by Springer Science+Business Media and the editor-in-chief is Henner Hollert (RWTH Aachen University). Since 2011, the journal has been open access.

== Abstracting and indexing ==
The journal is abstracted and indexed in:

- Academic OneFile
- Aquatic Sciences and Fisheries Abstracts
- Biological Abstracts
- BIOSIS Previews
- CABI
- Current Awareness in Biological Sciences
- Chemical Abstracts Service
- Expanded Academic
- GeoRef
- Global Health
- INIS Atomindex
- International Bibliography of Periodical Literature
- Scopus

According to the Journal Citation Reports, the journal has a 2021 impact factor of 5.481, ranking it 79th out of 279 journals in the category "Environmental Sciences".

== Controversies ==
In June 2014 ESE republished the retracted paper in question in the Séralini affair, which had been originally published in Food and Chemical Toxicology in September 2012 and then retracted in November 2013.
