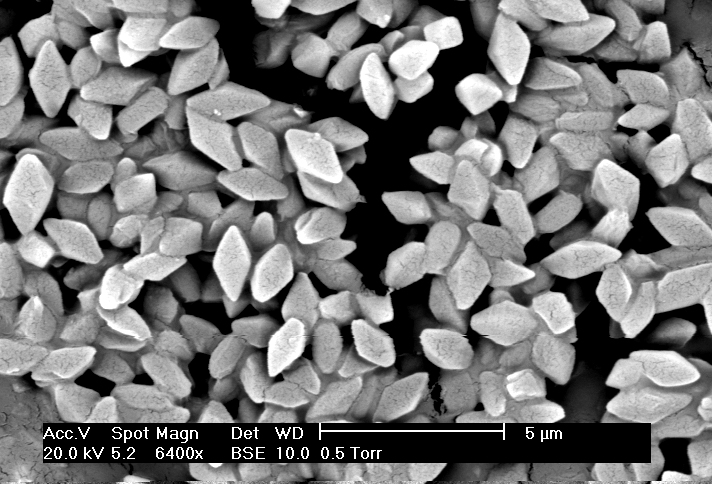
- Spores and bipyramidal crystals of Bacillus thuringiensis morrisoni strain T08025

Scientific classification
- Domain: Bacteria
- Kingdom: Bacillati
- Phylum: Bacillota
- Class: Bacilli
- Order: Caryophanales
- Family: Bacillaceae
- Genus: Bacillus
- Species: B. thuringiensis

Binomial name
- Bacillus thuringiensis Berliner 1915

Subspecies
- subsp. "aizawai" Oeda et al. 1987; subsp. "berliner" Klier et al. 1982; subsp. "colmeri" De Lucca et al. 1984; subsp. "coreanensis" Mizuki et al. 1999; subsp. "darmstadiensis" Ohba et al. 1979; subsp. "dendrolimus" Chen et al. 2004; subsp. "fukuokaensis" Ohba and Aizawa 1989; subsp. "galleriae" Sakanian et al. 1982; subsp. "guiyangiensis" Li et al. 1999; subsp. "higo" Ohba et al. 1995; subsp. "israelensis" Barjac 1978; subsp. "jinghongiensis" Li et al. 1999; subsp. "kurstaki" Bulla et al. 1979; subsp. "morrisoni" Cantwell et al. 1982; subsp. "oswaldocruzi" Rabinovitch et al. 1995; subsp. "pakistani" Barjac et al. 1977; subsp. "shandongiensis" Wang et al. 1986; subsp. "sotto" Shibano et al. 1985; subsp. "tenebrionis" Krieg et al. 1983; subsp. "thompsoni" Calabrese and Nickerson 1980; subsp. "toguchini" Khodyrev 1990; subsp. "tolworthi" Sick et al. 1990; subsp. "toumanoffii" Krieg 1969; subsp. "wuhanensis" Kuo and Chak 1996

= Bacillus thuringiensis =

Species of bacteria used as an insecticide

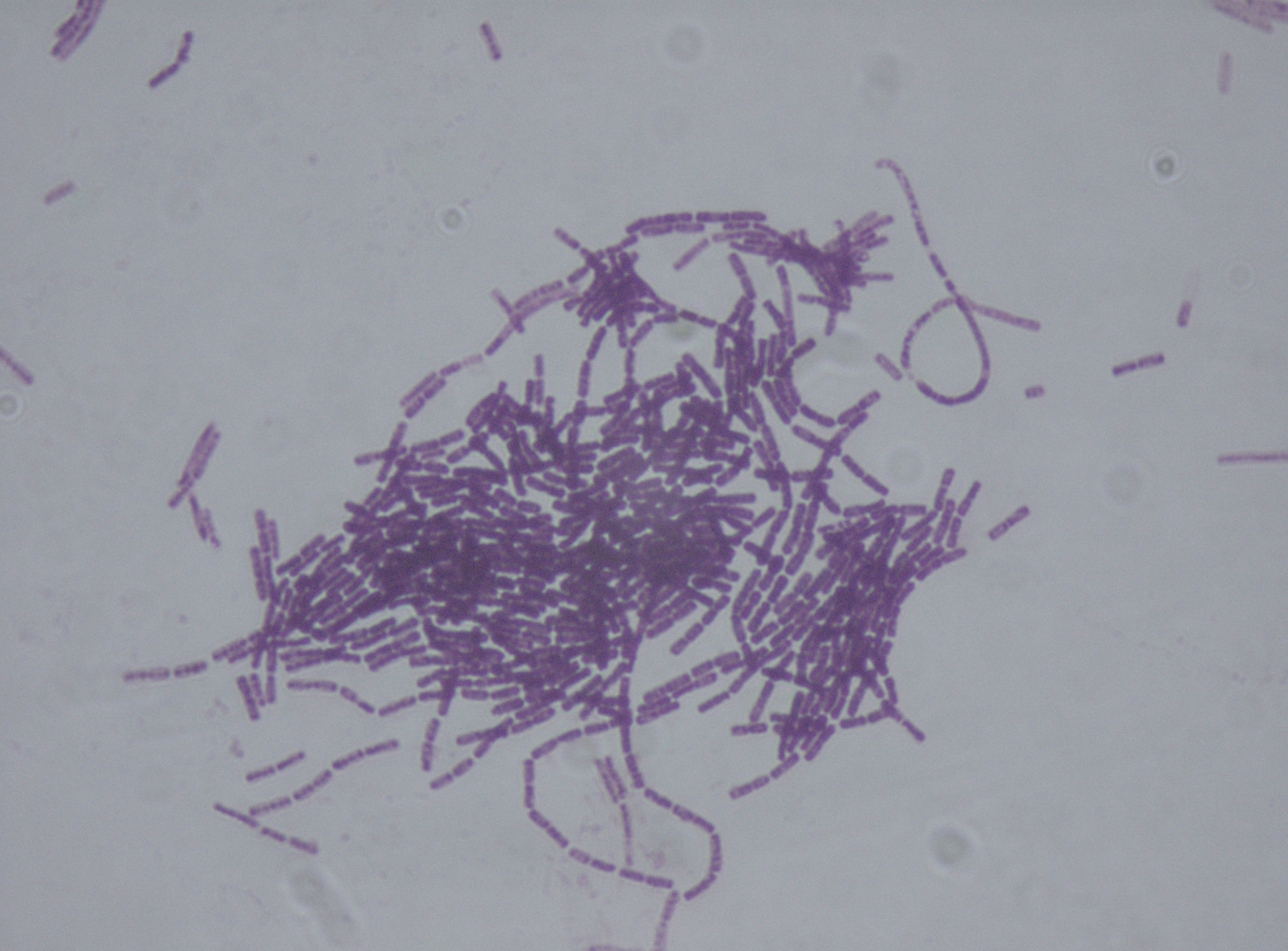
Gram stain of Bacillus thuringiensis under 1000 × magnification

Bacillus thuringiensis (or Bt) is a gram-positive, soil-dwelling bacterium. It is the most commonly used biological pesticide worldwide. B. thuringiensis also occurs naturally in the gut of caterpillars, the gut of various types of moths and butterflies, on leaf surfaces, and in aquatic environments, animal feces, insect-rich environments, flour mills and grain-storage facilities. B. thuringiensis has also been observed to parasitize moths such as Cadra calidella; in laboratory experiments working with C. calidella, many of the moths were diseased due to this parasite.

During sporulation, many Bt strains produce crystal proteins (proteinaceous inclusions), known as delta endotoxins, that have insecticidal action. This has led to the use of some strains as insecticides, and more recently to the creation of genetically modified crops using Bt genes (such as Bt corn); many crystal-producing Bt strains, however, do not have insecticidal properties.

Bacillus thuringiensis subsp. israelensis (Bti) was discovered in 1976 by Israeli researchers Yoel Margalith and B. Goldberg, in the Negev Desert of southern Israel. While investigating mosquito breeding sites in the region, they isolated a bacterial strain from a stagnant pond that exhibited potent larvicidal activity against various mosquito species, including Anopheles, Culex, and Aedes. This subspecies, israelensis, is now commonly used for the biological control of mosquitoes and fungus gnats due to its effectiveness and environmental safety.

As a toxic mechanism, cry proteins bind to specific receptors on the membranes of mid-gut (epithelial) cells of the targeted pests, resulting in their rupture. Other organisms (including humans, other animals and non-targeted insects) that lack the appropriate receptors in their gut cannot be affected by the cry protein, and therefore are not affected by Bt.

== Taxonomy and discovery ==
In 1902, B. thuringiensis was first discovered in silkworms by Japanese sericultural engineer Ishiwatari Shigetane (石渡 繁胤). He named it B. sotto, using the Japanese word sottō (卒倒; 'collapse'), here referring to bacillary paralysis. In 1911, German microbiologist Ernst Berliner rediscovered it when he isolated it as the cause of a disease called Schlaffsucht in flour moth caterpillars in Thuringia (hence the specific name thuringiensis, "Thuringian"). B. sotto would later be reassigned as B. thuringiensis var. sotto.

In 1976, Robert A. Zakharyan reported the presence of a plasmid in a strain of B. thuringiensis and suggested the plasmid's involvement in endospore and crystal formation. B. thuringiensis is closely related to B. cereus, a soil bacterium, and B. anthracis, the cause of anthrax; the three organisms differ mainly in their plasmids. Like other members of the genus, all three are capable of producing endospores.

=== Species group placement ===
B. thuringiensis is placed in the Bacillus cereus group which is variously defined as seven closely related species: B. cereus sensu stricto (B. cereus), B. anthracis, B. thuringiensis, B. mycoides, B. pseudomycoides, and B. cytotoxicus; or as six species in a Bacillus cereus sensu lato: B. weihenstephanensis, B. mycoides, B. pseudomycoides, B. cereus, B. thuringiensis, and B. anthracis. Within this grouping B.t. is more closely related to B.ce. It is more distantly related to B.w., B.m., B.p., and B.cy.

=== Subspecies ===
There are several dozen recognized subspecies of B. thuringiensis. Subspecies commonly used as insecticides include B. thuringiensis subspecies kurstaki (Btk), subspecies israelensis (Bti) and subspecies aizawai (Bta). Some Bti lineages are clonal.

== Genetics ==
Some strains are known to carry the same genes that produce enterotoxins in B. cereus, and so it is possible that the entire B. cereus sensu lato group may have the potential to be enteropathogens.

The proteins that B. thuringiensis is most known for are encoded by cry genes. In most strains of B. thuringiensis, these genes are located on a plasmid (in other words cry is not a chromosomal gene in most strains). If these plasmids are lost it becomes indistinguishable from B. cereus as B. thuringiensis has no other species characteristics. Plasmid exchange has been observed both naturally and experimentally both within B.t. and between B.t. and two congeners, B. cereus and B. mycoides.

plcR is an indispensable transcription regulator of most virulence factors, its absence greatly reducing virulence and toxicity. Some strains do naturally complete their life cycle with an inactivated plcR. It is half of a two-gene operon along with the heptapeptide papR. papR is part of quorum sensing in B. thuringiensis.

Various strains including Btk ATCC 33679 carry plasmids belonging to the wider pXO1-like family. (The pXO1 family being a B. cereus-common family with members of ≈330kb length. They differ from pXO1 by replacement of the pXO1 pathogenicity island.) The insect parasite Btk HD73 carries a pXO2-like plasmid (pBT9727) lacking the 35kb pathogenicity island of pXO2 itself, and in fact having no identifiable virulence factors. (The pXO2 family does not have replacement of the pathogenicity island, instead simply lacking that part of pXO2.)

The genomes of the B. cereus group may contain two types of introns, dubbed group I and group II. B.t strains have variously 0–5 group Is and 0–13 group IIs.

There is still insufficient information to determine whether chromosome-plasmid coevolution to enable adaptation to particular environmental niches has occurred or is even possible.

Common with B. cereus but so far not found elsewhere – including in other members of the species group – are the efflux pump BC3663, the N-acyl-L-amino-acid amidohydrolase BC3664, and the methyl-accepting chemotaxis protein BC5034.

== Mechanism of insecticidal action ==
Upon sporulation, B. thuringiensis forms crystals of two types of proteinaceous insecticidal delta endotoxins (δ-endotoxins) called crystal proteins or Cry proteins, which are encoded by cry genes, and Cyt proteins.

Cry toxins have specific activities against insect species of the orders Lepidoptera (moths and butterflies), Diptera (flies and mosquitoes), Coleoptera (beetles) and Hymenoptera (wasps, bees, ants and sawflies), as well as against nematodes. A specific example of B. thuringiensis use against beetles is the fight against Colorado Potato Beetles in potato crops. Thus, B. thuringiensis serves as an important reservoir of Cry toxins for production of biological insecticides and insect-resistant genetically modified crops. When insects ingest toxin crystals, their alkaline digestive tracts denature the insoluble crystals, making them soluble and thus amenable to being cut with proteases found in the insect gut, which liberate the toxin from the crystal. The Cry toxin is then inserted into the insect gut cell membrane, paralyzing the digestive tract and forming a pore. The insect stops eating and starves to death; live Bt bacteria may also colonize the insect, which can contribute to death. Death occurs within a few hours or weeks. The midgut bacteria of susceptible larvae may be required for B. thuringiensis insecticidal activity.

A B. thuringiensis small RNA called BtsR1 can silence the Cry5Ba toxin expression when outside the host by binding to the RBS site of the Cry5Ba toxin transcript to avoid nematode behavioral defenses. The silencing results in an increase of the bacteria ingestion by C. elegans. The expression of BtsR1 is then reduced after ingestion, resulting in Cry5Ba toxin production and host death.

In 1996 another class of insecticidal proteins in Bt was discovered: the vegetative insecticidal proteins (Vip; InterPro: IPR022180). Vip proteins do not share sequence homology with Cry proteins, in general do not compete for the same receptors, and some kill different insects than do Cry proteins.

In 2000, a novel subgroup of Cry protein, designated parasporin, was discovered from non-insecticidal B. thuringiensis isolates. The proteins of the parasporin group are defined as B. thuringiensis and related bacterial parasporal proteins that are not hemolytic, but capable of preferentially killing cancer cells. As of January 2013, parasporins comprise six subfamilies: PS1 to PS6.

== Use of spores and proteins in pest control ==
Spores and crystalline insecticidal proteins produced by B. thuringiensis have been used to control insect pests since the 1920s and are often applied as liquid sprays and donut pellets. They are now used as specific insecticides under trade names such as DiPel, Thuricide, and Mosquito Dunks. Because of their specificity, these pesticides are regarded as environmentally friendly, with little or no effect on humans, wildlife, pollinators, and most other beneficial insects, and are used in organic farming; however, the manuals for these products do contain many environmental and human health warnings, and a 2012 European regulatory peer review of five approved strains found, while data exist to support some claims of low toxicity to humans and the environment, the data are insufficient to justify many of these claims.

New strains of Bt are developed and introduced over time as insects develop resistance to Bt,. Companies modify organisms, use genetic engineering to improve crystal size and increase pesticidal activity, or broaden the host range of Bt and obtain more effective formulations. Each new strain is given a unique number and registered with the U.S. EPA and allowances may be given for genetic modification depending on "its parental strains, the proposed pesticide use pattern, and the manner and extent to which the organism has been genetically modified". Formulations of Bt that are approved for organic farming in the US are listed at the website of the Organic Materials Review Institute (OMRI) and several university extension websites offer advice on how to use Bt spore or protein preparations in organic farming.

== Use of Bt genes in genetic engineering of plants for pest control ==
The Belgian company Plant Genetic Systems (now part of Bayer CropScience) was the first company (in 1985) to develop genetically modified crops (tobacco) with insect tolerance by expressing cry genes from B. thuringiensis; the resulting crops contain delta endotoxin. The Bt tobacco was never commercialized; tobacco plants are used to test genetic modifications since they are easy to manipulate genetically and are not part of the food supply.

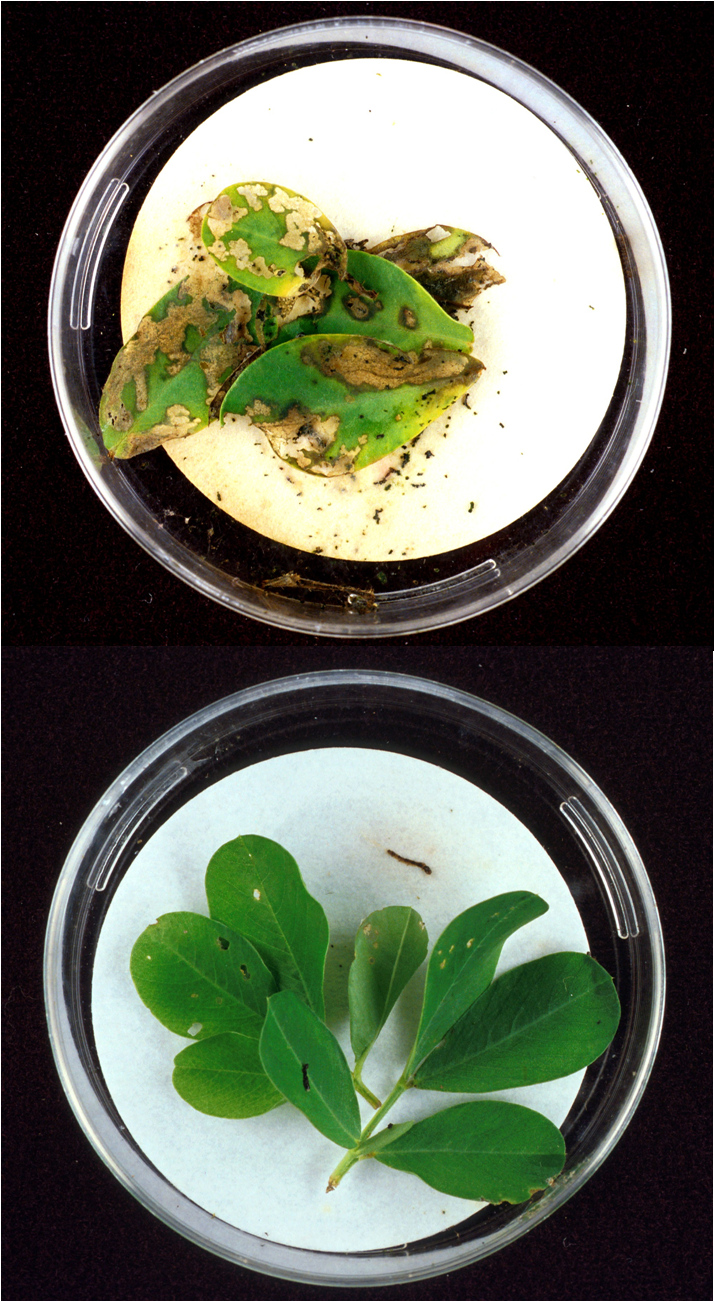
Bt toxins present in peanut leaves (bottom dish) protect it from extensive damage caused to unprotected peanut leaves by lesser cornstalk borer larvae (top dish).

=== Usage ===
In 1995, potato plants producing CRY 3A Bt toxin were approved safe by the Environmental Protection Agency, making it the first human-modified pesticide-producing crop to be approved in the US, though many plants produce pesticides naturally, including tobacco, coffee plants, cocoa, cotton and black walnut. This was the 'New Leaf' potato, and it was removed from the market in 2001 due to lack of interest.

In 1996, genetically modified maize producing Bt Cry protein was approved, which killed the European corn borer and related species; subsequent Bt genes were introduced that killed corn rootworm larvae.

The Bt genes engineered into crops and approved for release include, singly and stacked: Cry1A.105, CryIAb, CryIF, Cry2Ab, Cry3Bb1, Cry34Ab1, Cry35Ab1, mCry3A, and VIP, and the engineered crops include corn and cotton.

Corn genetically modified to produce VIP was first approved in the US in 2010.

In India, by 2014, more than seven million cotton farmers, occupying twenty-six million acres, had adopted Bt cotton.

Monsanto developed a soybean expressing Cry1Ac and the glyphosate-resistance gene for the Brazilian market, which completed the Brazilian regulatory process in 2010.

Bt aspen - specifically Populus hybrids - have been developed. They do suffer lesser leaf damage from insect herbivory. The results have not been entirely positive however: The intended result - better timber yield - was not achieved, with no growth advantage despite that reduction in herbivore damage; one of their major pests still preys upon the transgenic trees; and besides that, their leaf litter decomposes differently due to the transgenic toxins, resulting in alterations to the aquatic insect populations nearby.

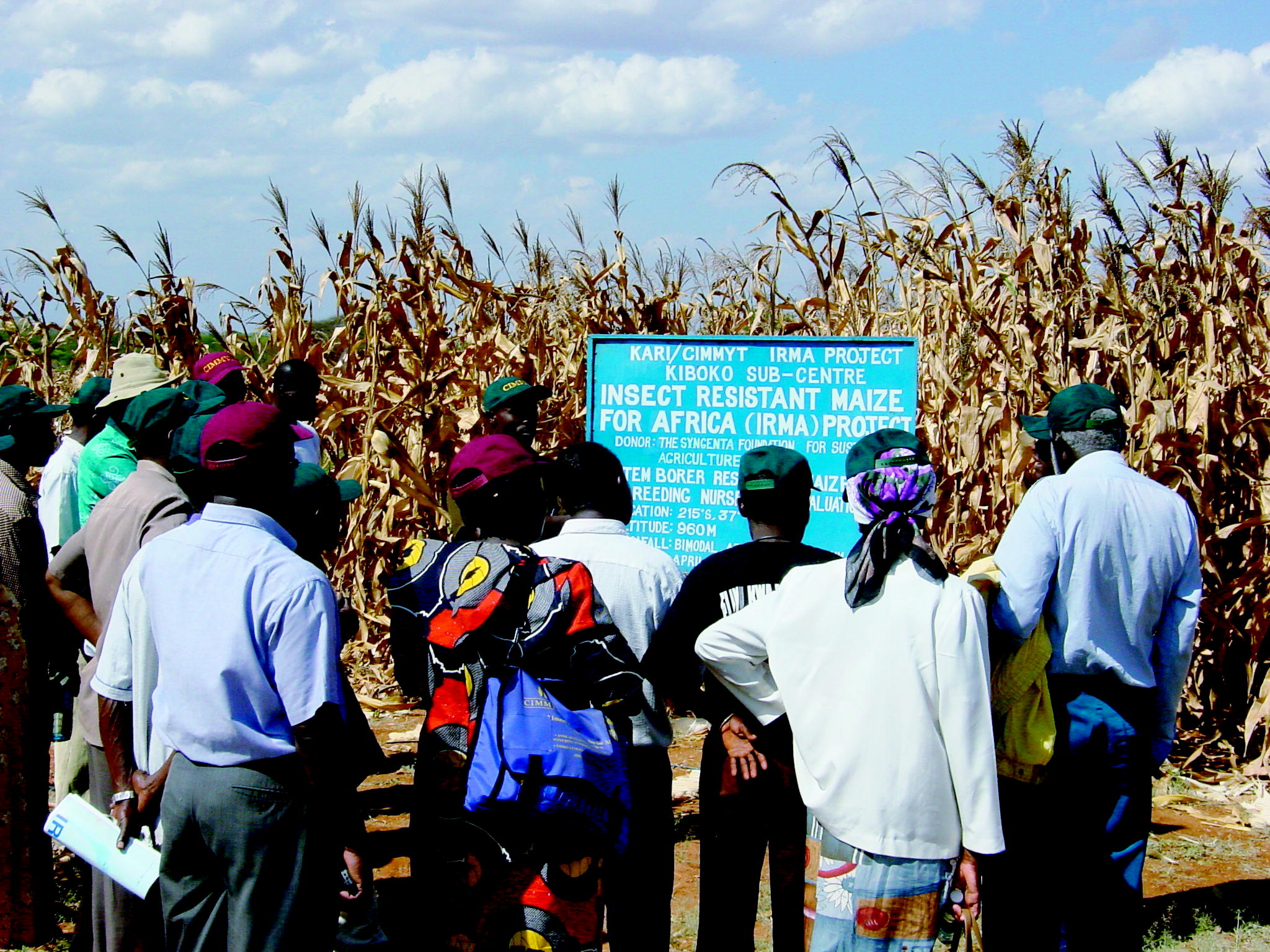
Agriculture enthusiasts examining insect-resistant transgenic Bt corn

=== Safety studies ===
The use of Bt toxins as plant-incorporated protectants prompted the need for extensive evaluation of their safety for use in foods and potential unintended impacts on the environment.

==== Dietary risk assessment ====
Concerns over the safety of consumption of genetically modified plant materials that contain Cry proteins have been addressed in extensive dietary risk assessment studies. As a toxic mechanism, cry proteins bind to specific receptors on the membranes of mid-gut (epithelial) cells of the targeted pests, resulting in their rupture. While the target pests are exposed to the toxins primarily through leaf and stalk material, Cry proteins are also expressed in other parts of the plant, including trace amounts in maize kernels which are ultimately consumed by both humans and animals. However, other organisms (including humans, other animals and non-targeted insects) that lack the appropriate receptors in their gut cannot be affected by the cry protein, and therefore are not affected by Bt.

===== Toxicology studies =====
Animal models have been used to assess human health risk from consumption of products containing Cry proteins. The United States Environmental Protection Agency recognizes mouse acute oral feeding studies where doses as high as 5,000 mg/kg body weight resulted in no observed adverse effects. Research on other known toxic proteins suggests that toxicity occurs at much lower doses, further suggesting that Bt toxins are not toxic to mammals. The results of toxicology studies are further strengthened by the lack of observed toxicity from decades of use of B. thuringiensis and its crystalline proteins as an insecticidal spray.

===== Allergenicity studies =====
Introduction of a new protein raised concerns regarding the potential for allergic responses in sensitive individuals. Bioinformatic analysis of known allergens has indicated there is no concern of allergic reactions as a result of consumption of Bt toxins. Additionally, skin prick testing using purified Bt protein resulted in no detectable production of toxin-specific IgE antibodies, even in atopic patients.

===== Digestibility studies =====
Studies have been conducted to evaluate the fate of Bt toxins that are ingested in foods. Bt toxin proteins have been shown to digest within minutes of exposure to simulated gastric fluids. The instability of the proteins in digestive fluids is an additional indication that Cry proteins are unlikely to be allergenic, since most known food allergens resist degradation and are ultimately absorbed in the small intestine.

===== Persistence in environment =====
Concerns over possible environmental impact from accumulation of Bt toxins from plant tissues, pollen dispersal, and direct secretion from roots have been investigated. Bt toxins may persist in soil for over 200 days, with half-lives between 1.6 and 22 days. Much of the toxin is initially degraded rapidly by microorganisms in the environment, while some is adsorbed by organic matter and persists longer. Some studies, in contrast, claim that the toxins do not persist in the soil. Bt toxins are less likely to accumulate in bodies of water, but pollen shed or soil runoff may deposit them in an aquatic ecosystem. Fish species are not susceptible to Bt toxins if exposed.

===== Impact on non-target organisms =====
The toxic nature of Bt proteins has an adverse impact on many major crop pests, but some ecological risk assessments has been conducted to ensure safety of beneficial non-target organisms that may come into contact with the toxins. Toxicity for the monarch butterfly, has been shown to not reach dangerous levels. Most soil-dwelling organisms, potentially exposed to Bt toxins through root exudates, are probably not impacted by the growth of Bt crops.

=== Insect resistance ===
Multiple insects have developed a resistance to B. thuringiensis, often due to overuse, or to use of lower-dose applications. Overuse results in only the most resistant individuals surviving to breed, which hastens the development of a resistant population. Repeated exposure to lower doses also increases the number of resistant individuals that survive to breed. The most effective management strategy for avoiding resistance is a high-dose/refuge strategy. Areas where a high dose is used, capable of killing large numbers of pests, are partnered with nearby refuge areas where non-resistant populations continue to live. When these non-resistant insects repopulate the target area, they breed with any resistant individuals that have survived, decreasing the likelihood that a resistant population will develop.

Another effective tactic is the use of "pyramided" Bt crops that target the same insect pest with multiple toxins. Individuals that can resist one toxin in a pyramid may be killed by another, decreasing the number of survivors. Refuges are still needed to delay resistance to pyramided Bt crops, by reducing the chance of a resistant population developing. Another strategy involves the release sterile insects to reduce the effective breeding population.

In some cases, integrated pest management strategies have prolonged the effectiveness of treatments, or even eradicated pests. In other cases inappropriate use has led to failure and development of resistant strains. Mexico is an example of a highly successful approach to fighting resistance in the bollworm. Farmers were allowed to plant Bt cotton strains but Bt corn was banned. Cotton bollworms feed on both cotton and corn, so Mexico’s cornfields became an effective refuge. As of 2023, Bt-resistant bollworm populations had not emerged in Mexico. However, it can be challenging to implement integrated pest management plans effectively. The companies developing Bt crops and the farmers using them may be unwilling to use strict refuge management plans; companies want to sell their products and farmers want to increase their yields, not leave some fields unprotected.

In November 2009, Monsanto scientists found the pink bollworm had become resistant to the first-generation Bt cotton in parts of Gujarat, India - that generation expresses one Bt gene, Cry1Ac. This was the first instance of Bt resistance confirmed by Monsanto anywhere in the world. Bollworm resistance to first-generation Bt cotton was also identified in Australia, China, Spain, and the United States. Additionally, resistance to Bt was documented in field population of diamondback moth in Hawaii, the continental US, and Asia. Monsanto responded by introducing a second-generation cotton with multiple Bt proteins, which was rapidly adopted. Studies in the cabbage looper have suggested that a mutation in the membrane transporter ABCC2 can confer resistance to Bt Cry1Ac.

=== Secondary pests ===
Several studies have documented surges in "sucking pests" (which are not affected by Bt toxins) within a few years of adoption of Bt cotton. In China, the main problem has been with mirids, which have in some cases "completely eroded all benefits from Bt cotton cultivation". The increase in sucking pests depended on local temperature and rainfall conditions and increased in half the villages studied. The increase in insecticide use for the control of these secondary insects was far smaller than the reduction in total insecticide use due to Bt cotton adoption. Another study in five provinces in China found the reduction in pesticide use in Bt cotton cultivars is significantly lower than that reported in research elsewhere, consistent with the hypothesis suggested by recent studies that more pesticide sprayings are needed over time to control emerging secondary pests, such as aphids, spider mites, and lygus bugs.

Similar problems have been reported in India, with both mealy bugs and aphids although a survey of small Indian farms between 2002 and 2008 concluded Bt cotton adoption has led to higher yields and lower pesticide use, decreasing over time.

=== Controversies ===
The controversies surrounding Bt use are among the many genetically modified food controversies more widely.

==== Lepidopteran toxicity ====
The most publicised problem associated with Bt crops is the claim that pollen from Bt maize could kill the monarch butterfly. The paper produced a public uproar and demonstrations against Bt maize; however by 2001 several follow-up studies coordinated by the USDA had asserted that "the most common types of Bt maize pollen are not toxic to monarch larvae in concentrations the insects would encounter in the fields." Similarly, B. thuringiensis has been widely used for controlling Spodoptera littoralis larvae growth due to their detrimental pest activities in Africa and Southern Europe. However, S. littoralis showed resistance to many strains of B. thuringiensis and were only effectively controlled by a few strains.

==== Wild maize genetic mixing ====
A study published in Nature in 2001 reported Bt-containing maize genes were found in maize in its center of origin, Oaxaca, Mexico. Another Nature paper published in 2002 claimed that the previous paper's conclusion was the result of an artifact caused by an inverse polymerase chain reaction and that "the evidence available is not sufficient to justify the publication of the original paper." A significant controversy happened over the paper and Nature's unprecedented notice.

A subsequent large-scale study in 2005 failed to find any evidence of genetic mixing in Oaxaca. A 2007 study found the "transgenic proteins expressed in maize were found in two (0.96%) of 208 samples from farmers' fields, located in two (8%) of 25 sampled communities." Mexico imports a substantial amount of maize from the U.S., and due to formal and informal seed networks among rural farmers, many potential routes are available for transgenic maize to enter into food and feed webs. One study found small-scale (about 1%) introduction of transgenic sequences in sampled fields in Mexico; it did not find evidence for or against this introduced genetic material being inherited by the next generation of plants. That study was immediately criticized, with the reviewer writing, "Genetically, any given plant should be either non-transgenic or transgenic, therefore for leaf tissue of a single transgenic plant, a GMO level close to 100% is expected. In their study, the authors chose to classify leaf samples as transgenic despite GMO levels of about 0.1%. We contend that results such as these are incorrectly interpreted as positive and are more likely to be indicative of contamination in the laboratory."

==== Colony collapse disorder ====
As of 2007, a new phenomenon called colony collapse disorder (CCD) began affecting bee hives all over North America. Initial speculation on possible causes included new parasites, pesticide use, and the use of Bt transgenic crops. The Mid-Atlantic Apiculture Research and Extension Consortium found no evidence that pollen from Bt crops is adversely affecting bees. According to the USDA, "Genetically modified (GM) crops, most commonly Bt corn, have been offered up as the cause of CCD. But there is no correlation between where GM crops are planted and the pattern of CCD incidents. Also, GM crops have been widely planted since the late 1990s, but CCD did not appear until 2006. In addition, CCD has been reported in countries that do not allow GM crops to be planted, such as Switzerland. German researchers have noted in one study a possible correlation between exposure to Bt pollen and compromised immunity to Nosema." The actual cause of CCD was unknown in 2007, and scientists believe it may have multiple exacerbating causes.

== Beta-exotoxins ==
Some isolates of B. thuringiensis produce a class of insecticidal small molecules called beta-exotoxin, the common name for which is thuringiensin. A consensus document produced by the OECD says: "Beta-exotoxins are known to be toxic to humans and almost all other forms of life and its presence is prohibited in B. thuringiensis microbial products". Thuringiensins are nucleoside analogues. They inhibit RNA polymerase activity, a process common to all forms of life, in rats and bacteria alike.

== Other hosts ==
This bacterium is an opportunistic pathogen of animals other than insects, causing necrosis, pulmonary infection, and/or food poisoning. It is unknown how common this is, because these infections are always taken to be B. cereus infections and are rarely tested for the Cry and Cyt proteins that are the only factor distinguishing B. thuringiensis from B. cereus.

== New nomenclature for pesticidal proteins (Bt toxins) ==
Bacillus thuringiensis is no longer the sole source of pesticidal proteins. The Bacterial Pesticidal Protein Resource Center (BPPRC) provides information on the rapidly expanding field of pesticidal proteins for academics, regulators, and research and development personnel.

== See also ==
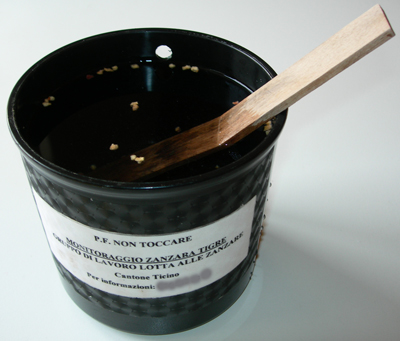
An ovitrap collects eggs from mosquitoes. The brown granules in the water are a B. t. israelensis preparation that kills hatched larvae.

- Biological insecticides
- Genetically modified food
- Western corn rootworm
- Cry1Ac
- Diamondback moth
- Sterile insect technique
