= Bacillus thuringiensis kurstaki =

Scientific classification
- Domain: Bacteria
- Phylum: Bacillota
- Class: Bacilli
- Order: Bacillales
- Family: Bacillaceae
- Genus: Bacillus
- Species: B. thuringiensis
- Subspecies: B. t. subsp. kurstaki

Trinomial name
- Bacillus thuringiensis subsp. kurstaki Bulla et al. 1979

Subspecies of bacterium

Bacillus thuringiensis subsp. kurstaki (Btk) is a group of bacteria used as biological control agents against lepidopterans (moths and butterflies). Btk, along with other B. thuringiensis products, is one of the most widely used biological pesticides due to its high specificity; it is effective against lepidopterans, and it has little to no effect on nontarget species. During sporulation, Btk produces a crystal protein that is lethal to lepidopteran larvae. Once ingested by the insect, the dissolution of the crystal allows the protoxin to be released. The toxin is then activated by the insect gut juice, and it begins to break down the gut.

Btk is available commercially, produced by companies such as Safer Brand, Bonide, and Monterey.

== Effects on nontarget species ==
Btk is generally regarded as environmentally safe, as its toxicity is essentially limited to its target pest; humans, wildlife, and beneficial insects are regarded as unaffected by the pesticide. Even so, in 2012, a regulatory review of several strains of Bt by the European Food Safety Authority stated that although there was data supporting the claims of low toxicity, the data was insufficient to prove the claims conclusively.

=== Humans ===
In studies of the effects of Bt on humans, most subjects were unaffected when exposed to Bt. Some individuals reacted with irritation of the eyes and skin. Other subjects with hay fever reported more significant effects, including throat irritation, upset stomach, and difficulty sleeping.

=== Trichogramma wasps ===
Trichogramma is a genus of parasitoid wasp whose females lay their eggs in the eggs of their hosts; after killing the host, an adult wasp emerges. For this reason, Trichogramma are often used as a biological control agent, and it can even be used in conjunction with pesticides like Btk. In November 2015, a study was conducted examining the effects of Btk on T. chilonis wasps. The study showed that high doses of strains of Btk containing δ-endotoxins were acutely toxic to the wasps, while Btk without these toxins had no adverse effects. It further showed that low doses of Btk, regardless of the strain, led to significantly greater longevity in the wasps.

=== Soil ===
In a 1998 study, Btk was added to different types of soil in order to determine how the type of soil affected the persistence and concentration of Btk. The results of the study showed that insecticidal activity started to decline after only a month in one soil, while in another toxicity was still high after six months. The authors of the study noted that even though Btk is considered non-toxic to nontarget species, the accumulation and persistence of the Btk toxins could eventually lead to environmental hazards or the selection of Btk-resistant lepidopterans.
