= Genetically modified maize =

Genetically modified crop

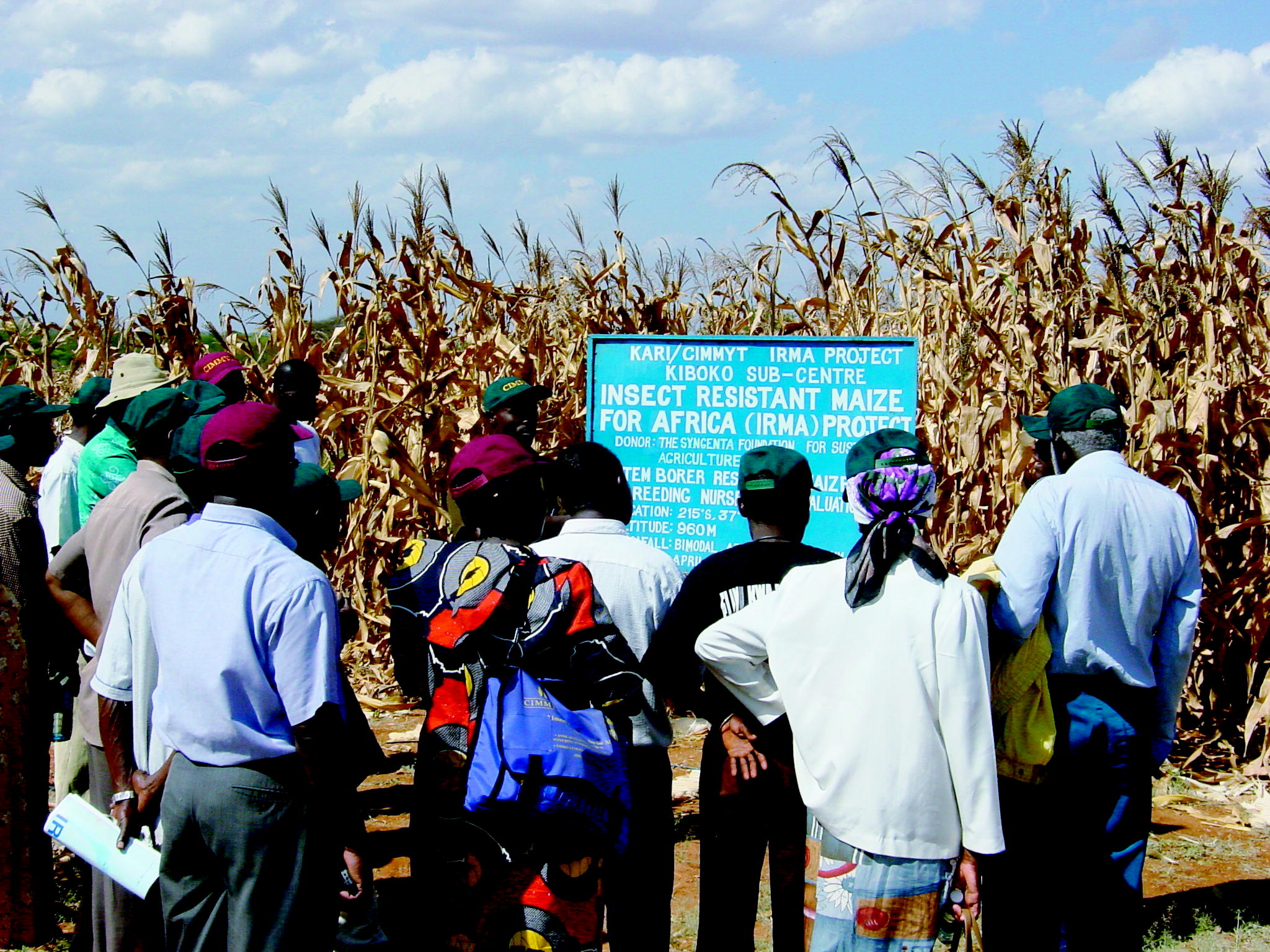
Transgenic maize containing a gene from the bacteria Bacillus thuringiensis

Genetically modified maize (corn) is a genetically modified crop. Specific maize strains have been genetically engineered to express agriculturally-desirable traits, including resistance to pests and to herbicides. Maize strains with both traits are now in use in multiple countries. GM maize has also caused controversy with respect to possible health effects, impact on other insects and impact on other plants via gene flow. One strain, called Starlink, was approved only for animal feed in the US but was found in food, leading to a series of recalls starting in 2000.

== Marketed products ==
=== Herbicide-resistant maize ===
Corn varieties resistant to glyphosate herbicides were first commercialized in 1996 by Monsanto, and are known as "Roundup Ready Corn". They tolerate the use of Roundup. Bayer CropScience developed "Liberty Link Corn" that is resistant to glufosinate. Pioneer Hi-Bred has developed and markets corn hybrids with tolerance to imidazoline herbicides under the trademark "Clearfield" – though in these hybrids, the herbicide-tolerance trait was bred using tissue culture selection and the chemical mutagen ethyl methanesulfonate, not genetic engineering. Consequently, the regulatory framework governing the approval of transgenic crops does not apply for Clearfield.

As of 2011, herbicide-resistant GM corn was grown in 14 countries. By 2012, 26 varieties of herbicide-resistant GM maize were authorised for import into the European Union, but such imports remain controversial. Cultivation of herbicide-resistant corn in the EU provides substantial farm-level benefits.

=== Insect-resistant corn ===
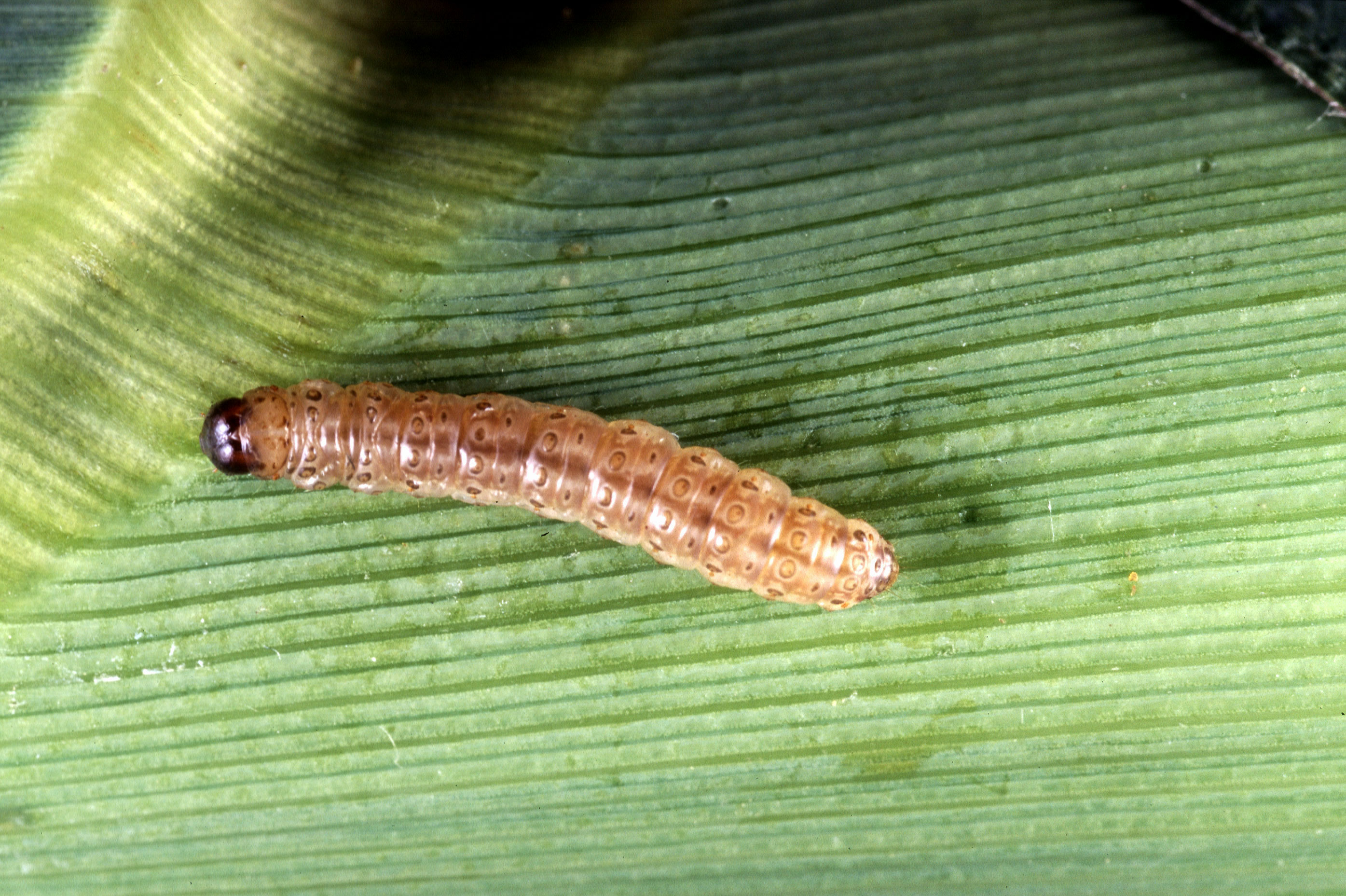
The European corn borer, Ostrinia nubilalis, destroys corn crops by burrowing into the stem, causing the plant to fall over.

==== Bt maize/corn ====
Bt maize/Bt corn is a variant of maize that has been genetically altered to express one or more proteins from the bacterium Bacillus thuringiensis including Delta endotoxins. The protein is poisonous to certain insect pests. Spores of the bacillus are widely used in organic gardening, although GM corn is not considered organic. The European corn borer causes about a billion dollars in damage to corn crops each year.

In recent years, traits have been added to ward off corn ear worms and root worms, the latter of which annually causes about a billion dollars in damages.

The Bt protein is expressed throughout the plant. When a vulnerable insect eats the Bt-containing plant, the protein is activated in its gut, which is alkaline. In the alkaline environment, the protein partially unfolds and is cut by other proteins, forming a toxin that paralyzes the insect's digestive system and forms holes in the gut wall. The insect stops eating within a few hours and eventually starves.

In 1996, the first GM maize producing a Bt Cry protein was approved, which killed the European corn borer and related species; subsequent Bt genes were introduced that killed corn rootworm larvae.

The Philippine Government has promoted Bt corn, hoping for insect resistance and higher yields.

Approved Bt genes include single and stacked (event names bracketed) configurations of: Cry1A.105 (MON89034), CryIAb (MON810), CryIF (1507), Cry2Ab (MON89034), Cry3Bb1 (MON863 and MON88017), Cry34Ab1 (59122), Cry35Ab1 (59122), mCry3A (MIR604), and Vip3A (MIR162), in both corn and cotton. Corn genetically modified to produce VIP was first approved in the US in 2010.

A 2018 study found that Bt-corn protected nearby fields of non-Bt corn and nearby vegetable crops, reducing the use of pesticides on those crops. Data from 1976 to 1996 (before Bt corn was widespread) was compared to data after it was adopted (1996–2016). They examined levels of the European corn borer and corn earworm. Their larvae eat a variety of crops, including peppers and green beans. Between 1992 and 2016, the amount of insecticide applied to New Jersey pepper fields decreased by 85 percent. Another factor was the introduction of more effective pesticides that were applied less often.

==== Sweet Corn ====
GM sweet corn varieties include "Attribute", the brand name for insect-resistant sweet corn developed by Syngenta and Performance Series insect-resistant sweet corn developed by Monsanto.

==== Cuba ====
While Cuba's agriculture is largely focused on organic production, as of 2010, the country had developed a variety of genetically modified corn that is resistant to the palomilla moth.

=== Drought-resistant maize ===
In 2013 Monsanto launched the first transgenic drought tolerance trait in a line of corn hybrids called DroughtGard. The MON 87460 trait is provided by the insertion of the cspB gene from the soil microbe Bacillus subtilis; it was approved by the USDA in 2011 and by China in 2013.

==== Health Safety ====
In regular corn crops, insects promote fungal colonization by creating "wounds," or holes, in corn kernels. These wounds are favored by fungal spores for germination, which subsequently leads to mycotoxin accumulation in the crop that can be carcinogenic and toxic to humans and other animals. This can prove to be especially devastating in developing countries with drastic climate patterns such as high temperatures, which favor the development of toxic fungi. In addition, higher mycotoxin levels leads to market rejection or reduced market prices for the grain. GM corn crops encounter fewer insect attacks, and thus, have lower concentrations of mycotoxins. Meta-analyses of long-term field studies are reporting that Bt maize contains significantly lower concentrations of mycotoxins with carcinogens than non-GM maize, mainly due to reduced insect damage to the kernels. Fewer insect attacks also keep corn ears from being damaged, which increases overall yields.

== Products in development ==
In 2007, South African researchers announced the production of transgenic maize resistant to maize streak virus (MSV), although it has not been released as a product. While breeding cultivars for resistance to MSV isn't done in the public, the private sector, international research centers, and national programmes have done all of the breeding. As of 2014, there have been a few MSV-tolerant cultivars released in Africa. A private company Seedco has released 5 MSV cultivars.

Research has been done on adding a single Escherichia coli gene to maize to enable it to be grown with an essential amino acid (methionine).

== Refuges ==
US Environmental Protection Agency (EPA) regulations require farmers who plant Bt corn to plant non-Bt corn nearby (called a refuge), with the logic that pests will infest the non-Bt corn and thus will not evolve a resistance to the Bt toxin. Typically, 20% of corn in a grower's fields must be refuge; refuge must be at least 0.5 miles (800 m) from Bt corn for lepidopteran pests, and refuge for corn rootworm must at least be adjacent to a Bt field. EPA regulations also require seed companies to train farmers how to maintain refuges, to collect data on the refuges and to report that data to the EPA. A study of these reports found that from 2003 to 2005 farmer compliance with keeping refuges was above 90%, but that by 2008 approximately 25% of Bt corn farmers did not keep refuges properly, raising concerns that resistance would develop.

Unmodified crops received most of the economic benefits of Bt corn in the US in 1996–2007, because of the overall reduction of pest populations. This reduction came because females laid eggs on modified and unmodified strains alike, but pest organisms that develop on the modified strain are eliminated.

Seed bags containing both Bt and refuge seed have been approved by the EPA in the United States. These seed mixtures were marketed as "Refuge in a Bag" to increase farmer compliance with refuge requirements and reduce additional work needed at planting from having separate Bt and refuge seed bags on hand. The EPA approved a lower percentage of refuge seed in these seed mixtures ranging from 5 to 10%. This strategy is likely to reduce the likelihood of Bt-resistance occurring for corn rootworm, but may increase the risk of resistance for lepidopteran pests, such as European corn borer. Increased concerns for resistance with seed mixtures include partially resistant larvae on a Bt plant being able to move to a susceptible plant to survive or cross pollination of refuge pollen on to Bt plants that can lower the amount of Bt expressed in kernels for ear feeding insects.

== Resistance ==
Resistant strains of the European corn borer have developed in areas with defective or absent refuge management. In 2012, a Florida field trial demonstrated that army worms were resistant to Bt maize produced by Dupont-Dow; armyworm resistance was first discovered in Puerto Rico in 2006, prompting Dow and DuPont to voluntarily stop selling the product on the island.

Effective Bt maize strains reduce total insect damage, which lowers fungal infections and the mycotoxin accumulation in the crop. On the contrary, if pest populations develop resistance these benefits are compromised hence highlighting importance of having proper resistance strategies.

== Regulation ==
Regulation of GM crops varies between countries, with some of the most-marked differences occurring between the US and Europe. Regulation varies in a given country depending on intended uses.

== Controversy ==
There is a scientific consensus that currently available food derived from GM crops poses no greater risk to human health than conventional food, but that each GM food needs to be tested on a case-by-case basis before introduction. Nonetheless, members of the public are much less likely than scientists to perceive GM foods as safe. The legal and regulatory status of GM foods varies by country, with some nations banning or restricting them, and others permitting them with widely differing degrees of regulation.

The scientific rigor of the studies regarding human health has been disputed due to alleged lack of independence and due to conflicts of interest involving governing bodies and some of those who perform and evaluate the studies. However, no reports of ill effects from GM food have been documented in the human population.

GM crops provide a number of ecological benefits, but there are also concerns for their overuse, stalled research outside of the Bt seed industry, proper management and issues with Bt resistance arising from their misuse.

Critics have objected to GM crops on ecological, economic and health grounds. The economic issues derive from those organisms that are subject to intellectual property law, mostly patents. The first generation of GM crops lose patent protection beginning in 2015. Monsanto has claimed it will not pursue farmers who retain seeds of off-patent varieties. These controversies have led to litigation, international trade disputes, protests and to restrictive legislation in most countries.

Introduction of Bt maize led to significant reduction of mycotoxin-related poisoning and cancer rates, as they were significantly less prone to contain mycotoxins (29%), fumonisins (31%) and thricotecens (37%), all of which are toxic and carcinogenic.

=== Effects on nontarget insects ===
Critics claim that Bt proteins could target predatory and other beneficial or harmless insects as well as the targeted pest. These proteins have been used as organic sprays for insect control in France since 1938 and the USA since 1958 with no ill effects on the environment reported. While cyt proteins are toxic towards the insect order Diptera (flies), certain cry proteins selectively target lepidopterans (moths and butterflies), while other cyt selectively target Coleoptera. As a toxic mechanism, cry proteins bind to specific receptors on the membranes of mid-gut (epithelial) cells, resulting in rupture of those cells. Any organism that lacks the appropriate gut receptors cannot be affected by the cry protein, and therefore Bt. Regulatory agencies assess the potential for the transgenic plant to impact nontarget organisms before approving commercial release.

A 1999 study found that in a lab environment, pollen from Bt maize dusted onto milkweed could harm the monarch butterfly. Several groups later studied the phenomenon in both the field and the laboratory, resulting in a risk assessment that concluded that any risk posed by the corn to butterfly populations under real-world conditions was negligible. A 2002 review of the scientific literature concluded that "the commercial large-scale cultivation of current Bt–maize hybrids did not pose a significant risk to the monarch population". A 2007 review found that "nontarget invertebrates are generally more abundant in Bt cotton and Bt maize fields than in nontransgenic fields managed with insecticides. However, in comparison with insecticide-free control fields, certain nontarget taxa are less abundant in Bt fields."

A systematic review concluded that the cultivation of Bt maize does not cause widespread negative effects on the ecological function of non-target arthropods when compared to the non-GM maize.

=== Gene flow ===
Gene flow is the transfer of genes and/or alleles from one species to another. Concerns focus on the interaction between GM and other maize varieties in Mexico, and of gene flow into refuges.

In 2009 the government of Mexico created a regulatory pathway for genetically modified maize, but because Mexico is the center of diversity for maize, gene flow could affect a large fraction of the world's maize strains. A 2001 report in Nature presented evidence that Bt maize was cross-breeding with unmodified maize in Mexico. The data in this paper was later described as originating from an artifact. Nature later stated, "the evidence available is not sufficient to justify the publication of the original paper". A 2005 large-scale study failed to find any evidence of contamination in Oaxaca. However, other authors also found evidence of cross-breeding between natural maize and transgenic maize.

A 2004 study found Bt protein in kernels of refuge corn.

In 2017, a large-scale study found "pervasive presence of transgenes and glyphosate in maize-derived food in Mexico"

=== Food ===
The French High Council of Biotechnologies Scientific Committee reviewed the 2009 Vendômois et al. study and concluded that it "presents no admissible scientific element likely to ascribe any haematological, hepatic or renal toxicity to the three re-analysed GMOs." However, the French government applies the precautionary principle with respect to GMOs.

A review by Food Standards Australia New Zealand and others of the same study concluded that the results were due to chance alone.

A 2011 Canadian study looked at the presence of CryAb1 protein (BT toxin) in non-pregnant women, pregnant women and fetal blood. All groups had detectable levels of the protein, including 93% of pregnant women and 80% of fetuses at concentrations of 0.19 ± 0.30 and 0.04 ± 0.04 mean ± SD ng/ml, respectively. The paper did not discuss safety implications or find any health problems. FSANZ agency published a comment pointing out a number of inconsistencies in the paper, most notably that it "does not provide any evidence that GM foods are the source of the protein".

In January 2013, the European Food Safety Authority released all data submitted by Monsanto in relation to the 2003 authorisation of maize genetically modified for glyphosate tolerance.

=== Starlink corn recalls ===
StarLink contains Cry9C, which had not previously been used in a GM crop. Starlink's creator, Plant Genetic Systems, had applied to the US Environmental Protection Agency (EPA) to market Starlink for use in animal feed and in human food. However, because the Cry9C protein lasts longer in the digestive system than other Bt proteins, the EPA had concerns about its allergenicity, and PGS did not provide sufficient data to prove that Cry9C was not allergenic. As a result, PGS split its application into separate permits for use in food and use in animal feed. Starlink was approved by the EPA for use in animal feed only in May 1998.

StarLink corn was subsequently found in food destined for consumption by humans in the US, Japan, and South Korea. This corn became the subject of the widely publicized Starlink corn recall, which started when Taco Bell-branded taco shells sold in supermarkets were found to contain the corn. Sales of StarLink seed were discontinued. The registration for Starlink varieties was voluntarily withdrawn by Aventis in October 2000. Pioneer had been bought by AgrEvo which then became Aventis CropScience at the time of the incident, which was later bought by Bayer.

Fifty-one people reported adverse effects to the FDA; US Centers for Disease Control (CDC), which determined that 28 of them were possibly related to Starlink. However, the CDC studied the blood of these 28 individuals and concluded there was no evidence of hypersensitivity to the Starlink Bt protein.

A subsequent review of these tests by the Federal Insecticide, Fungicide, and Rodenticide Act Scientific Advisory Panel points out that while "the negative results decrease the probability that the Cry9C protein is the cause of allergic symptoms in the individuals examined ... in the absence of a positive control and questions regarding the sensitivity and specificity of the assay, it is not possible to assign a negative predictive value to this."

The US corn supply has been monitored for the presence of the Starlink Bt proteins since 2001.

In 2005, aid sent by the UN and the US to Central American nations also contained some StarLink corn. The nations involved, Nicaragua, Honduras, El Salvador and Guatemala refused to accept the aid.

=== Corporate espionage ===
On 19 December 2013 six Chinese citizens were indicted in Iowa on charges of plotting to steal genetically modified seeds worth tens of millions of dollars from Monsanto and DuPont. Mo Hailong, director of international business at the Beijing Dabeinong Technology Group Co., part of the Beijing-based DBN Group, was accused of stealing trade secrets after he was found digging in an Iowa cornfield.

== See also ==
- Genetically modified food
- Genetically modified food controversies
