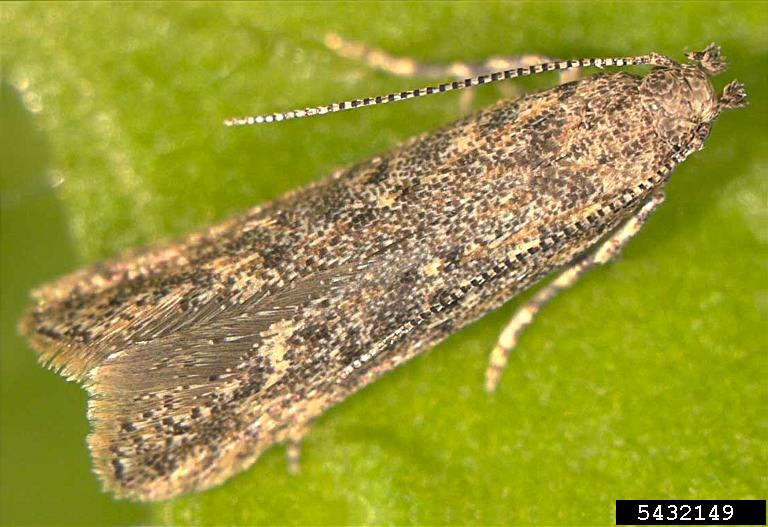

Scientific classification
- Kingdom: Animalia
- Phylum: Arthropoda
- Clade: Pancrustacea
- Class: Insecta
- Order: Lepidoptera
- Family: Gelechiidae
- Genus: Tuta
- Species: T. absoluta

Binomial name
- Tuta absoluta (Meyrick, 1917)

Synonyms
- Scrobipalpuloides absoluta (Povolný, 1987); Scrobipalpula absoluta (Povolný, 1964; Becker, 1984); Gnorimoschema absoluta (Clarke, 1962); Phthorimaea absoluta Meyrick, 1917

= Tuta absoluta =

Pest worm of tomato, potato, and others

Tuta absoluta or Phthorimaea absoluta is a species of moth in family Gelechiidae known by the common names South American tomato pinworm, tomato leafminer, tomato pinworm and South American tomato moth. It is well known as a serious pest of tomato crops in Europe, Africa, western Asia and South and Central America, with larvae causing up to 100% loss if not effectively controlled.

== Naming history ==
T. absoluta was originally described in 1917 by Edward Meyrick as Phthorimaea absoluta, based on individuals collected from Huancayo (Peru). Later, the pest was reported as Gnorimoschema absoluta, Scrobipalpula absoluta (Povolný), or Scrobipalpuloides absoluta (Povolný), but was finally described under the genus Tuta as T. absoluta by Povolný in 1994.

== Biology ==
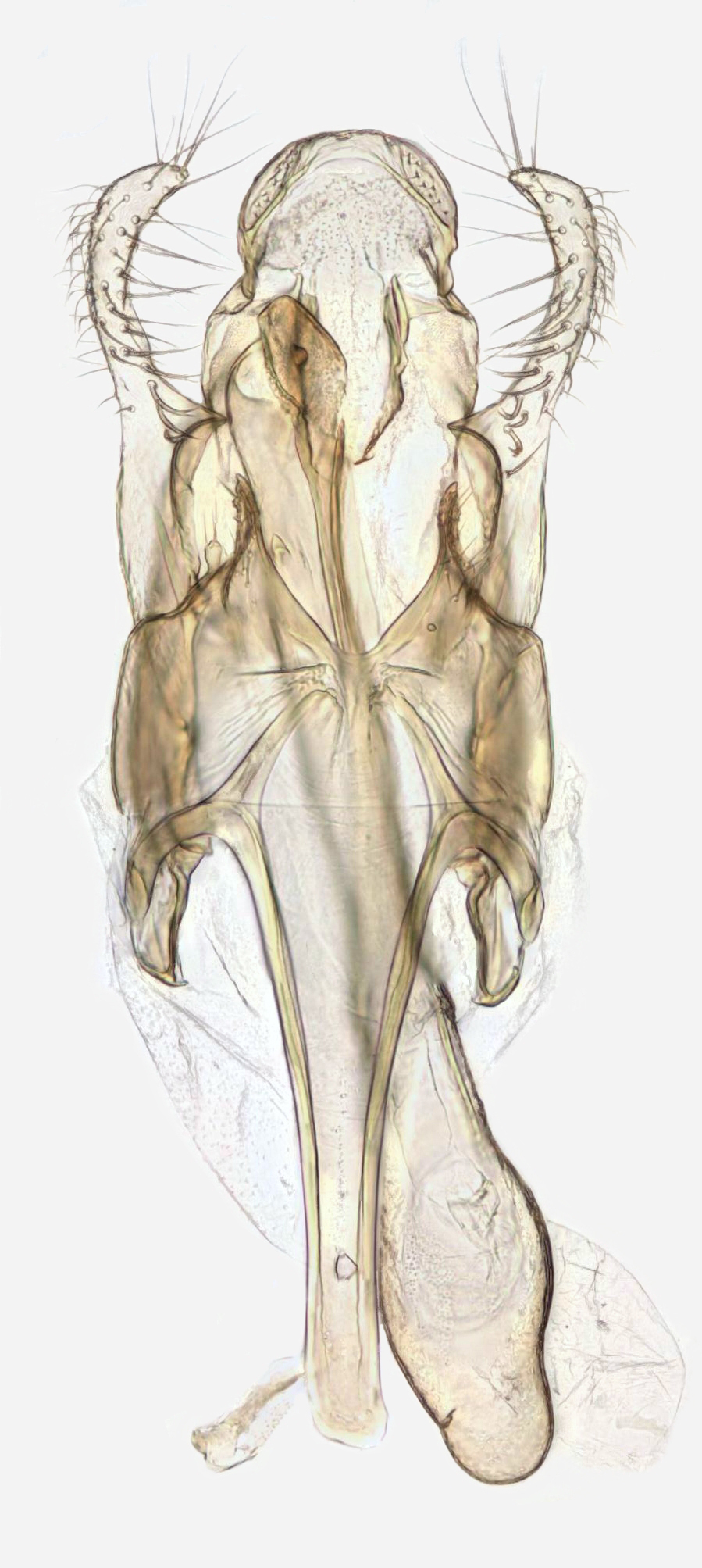
Male genitalia

The larva feeds voraciously upon tomato plants, producing large galleries in leaves, burrowing in stalks, and consuming apical buds and green and ripe fruits. It is capable of causing a yield loss of 100%. Prefers 30 °C (86 °F), requires 14 to 34.6 °C (57.2 to 94.3 °F) for full lifecycle. Nonetheless cold tolerance does allow for 50% survival of larvae, pupae, and adults, at 0 °C (32 °F).

Its life-cycle comprises four development stages: egg, larva, pupa and adult; combined, 26–75 days. Adults usually lay yellow eggs on the underside of leaves or stems, and to a lesser extent on fruits. After hatching, young larvae penetrate leaves, aerial fruits (like tomato) or stems, on which they feed and develop. Pupae (length: 5–6 millimetres (13/64–15/64 in)) are cylindrical in shape and greenish when just formed becoming darker in color as they are near adult emergence. The pest mainly presents nocturnal habits, and adults usually remain hidden during the day, showing greater morning-crepuscular activity with adults dispersing among crops by flying. Among a range of species within the Solanaceae, tomatoes (Lycopersicon esculentum Miller) appear to be the primary host of T. absoluta.

=== Reproduction ===
No evidence of short-day diapause. Up to 10 generations per year. Sex pheromone variation was shown by Dominguez et al 2019 to be influenced by the aging process and by plant volatiles.

=== Morphology ===
Adults are 6–7 millimetres (15/64–9/32 in) in length and present filiform antennae and silver to grey scales. Black spots are present on anterior wings, and the females are wider and more voluminous than the males.

The adult moth has a wingspan around 1 centimetre (3/8 in). In favorable weather conditions, eight to ten generations can occur in a single year.

=== Hosts ===
Tomato is the main host plant, but T. absoluta also attacks other crop plants of the nightshade family, including potato, eggplant, pepino, pepper and tobacco.

This introduction of other hosts is due to multiple relocations of the agriculture of these crops.

It is known from many solanaceous weeds, including Datura stramonium and Solanum nigrum.

Also known from non-Solanaceae hosts in the Amaranthaceae, Convolvulaceae, Fabaceae, and Malvaceae.

=== Laboratory rearing ===
Laboratory rearing is abnormally difficult because T. absoluta requires maternal leaf contact with a suitable host plant for oviposition.

== Global spread ==
This moth was first known as a tomato pest in many South American countries (and Easter Island) and was recognized to threaten cultivation in Europe. However, the EU did not list it as an inspection or quarantine pest, and this likely contributed to what happened next. In 2006, it was identified in Spain from a Chilean parental population introduced to Spain in the early 2000s. The following year it was detected in France, Italy, Greece, Malta, Algeria and Libya. Morocco in 2008. Starting in 2009, seeing the results of inaction in Europe, the North American Plant Protection Organization, the United States, California, Florida, Canada, and Australia began inspections and preparation for quarantines. Also in 2009 it was first reported from Turkey. The advance of T. absoluta continued to the east to reach Syria, Lebanon, Jordan, Israel, Iraq and Iran. Further advances southward reached Saudi Arabia, Yemen, Oman and the rest of the Persian Gulf states. In Africa, T. absoluta moved from Egypt to reach Sudan, South Sudan and Ethiopia from the east and to reach the Senegal from the west. It was reported in Nigeria and Zambia and South Africa in 2016. An up-to-date global distribution map is available on the Tuta absoluta information network. Reached India and the Himalayans, unconfirmed but possibly also Pakistan and Tajikistan, by 2017. In India, Maharashtra state tomato cultivation more affect in November 2016. It is now severely infested in Myanmar, especially in tropical tomato growing areas such as Mandalay, Sagaing, Monywa.( April, 2017) In the last few years Tuta absoluta has spread to Kenya. Although it is not there yet, researchers at the University of Guam are concerned about the possible spread of T. absoluta to Guam. As of 2017 USDA's Animal and Plant Health Inspection Service assumed T. absoluta to be present in most of sub-Saharan Africa. Present in Cape Verde and Turkey since the 2010-11 survey.

There is a high risk of further invasion northward into more of Central America, and into the United States (a certainty, if it reaches as far as Mexico); all suitable areas of sub-Saharan Africa and southern Asia; and Australia and New Zealand. There is a lower risk of invasion in colder areas like Canada, northern Europe, and most of the Russian Federation.

This rapid spread across Mediterranean Europe was due to insufficient coordinated plant protection activity against invasive agricultural pests.

In 2014 the People's Republic of China's Chinese Academy of Agricultural Sciences' Department of Biological Invasions began surveillance and treatment of their own and neighboring countries (including India and Pakistan) that already have the pest. Surveillance occurs in production areas and near international airports.

== Damage ==
Losses on tomatoes can reach 100% due to larval feeding, if not effectively controlled. Even if not that severe, damage will require postharvest inspection expenditures and some financial loss due to unattractive fruit. The initial European invasion increased tomato production costs by more than 450€/hectare.

== Management ==
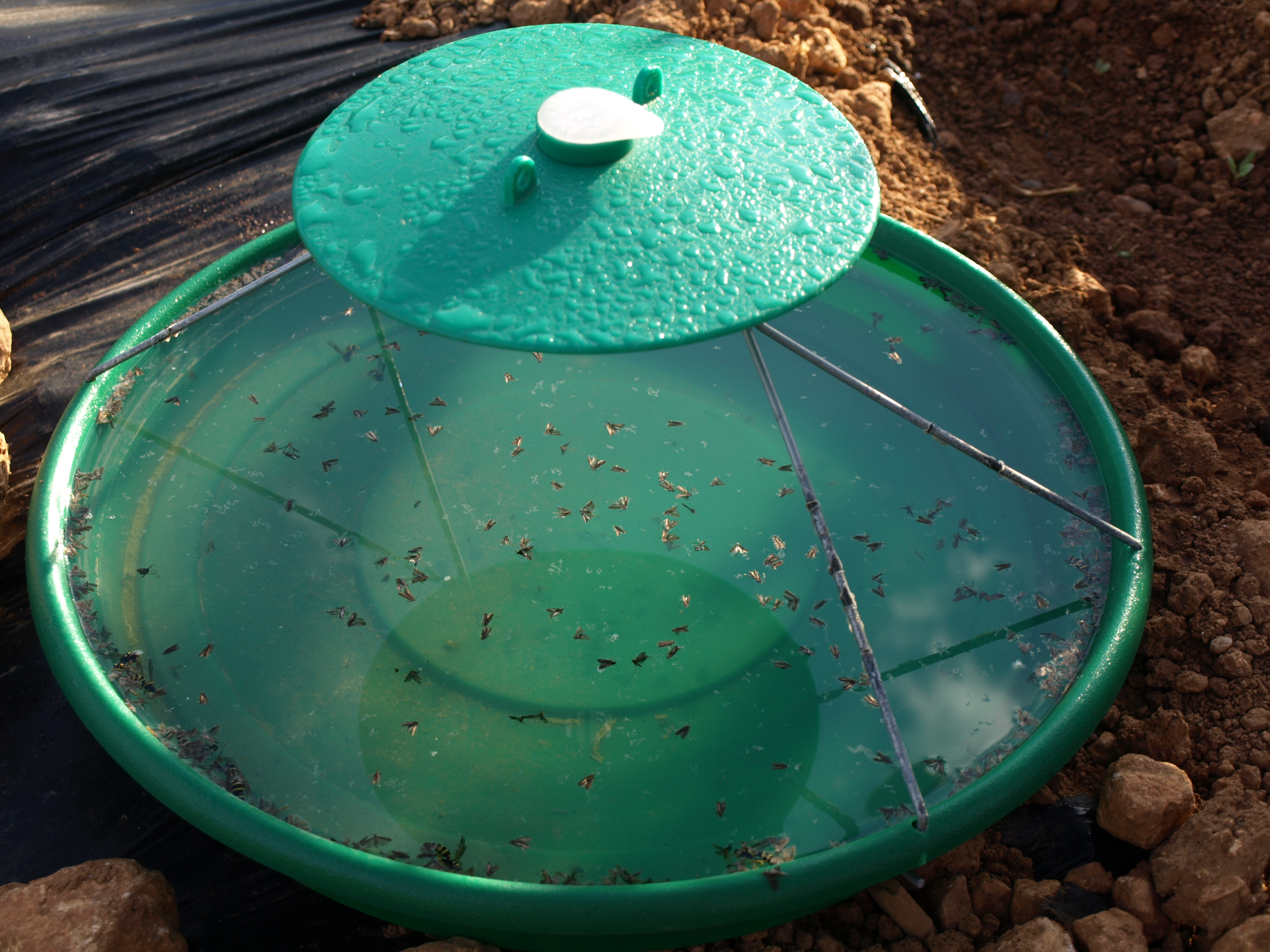
Water synthetic sex pheromones trap for Tuta absoluta

Some populations of T. absoluta have developed resistance to organophosphate and pyrethroid pesticides. Newer compounds such as spinosad, imidacloprid, and Bacillus thuringiensis have demonstrated some efficacy in controlling European outbreaks of this moth. Insecticide costs have increased rapidly, and even that has not always produced good results, due to high quantity application of insecticides that are not especially effective against T. absoluta. As a result, new registrations have been obtained specifically for this pest starting in 2009. Between 2009 and 2011 there was a dramatic increase in authorized APIs and MoAs in Spain and Tunisia for this reason.

A large number of insecticide MoAs are effective, and various ones are registered in various jurisdictions, including: Acetylcholinesterase inhibitors (IRAC group 1B), voltage-gated sodium channel modulators (3A), nicotinic acetylcholine receptor modulators (5), chloride channel activators (6), midgut membrane disruptor (11), oxidative phosphorylation uncouplers (13), nicotinic acetylcholine receptor blockers (15), ecdysone receptor agonists (18), volgate-gated sodium channel blockers (22A and 22B), ryanodine receptor modulators (28), and azadirachtin (of unknown action, UN).

Experiments have revealed some promising agents of biological pest control for this moth, including Nabis pseudoferus, a species of damsel bug, Bacillus thuringiensis, and Beauveria bassiana. Companion planting with Fagopyrum esculentum works by increasing numbers of the parasitoid Necremnus tutae.

Relatively natural chemical controls include limonene and borax.

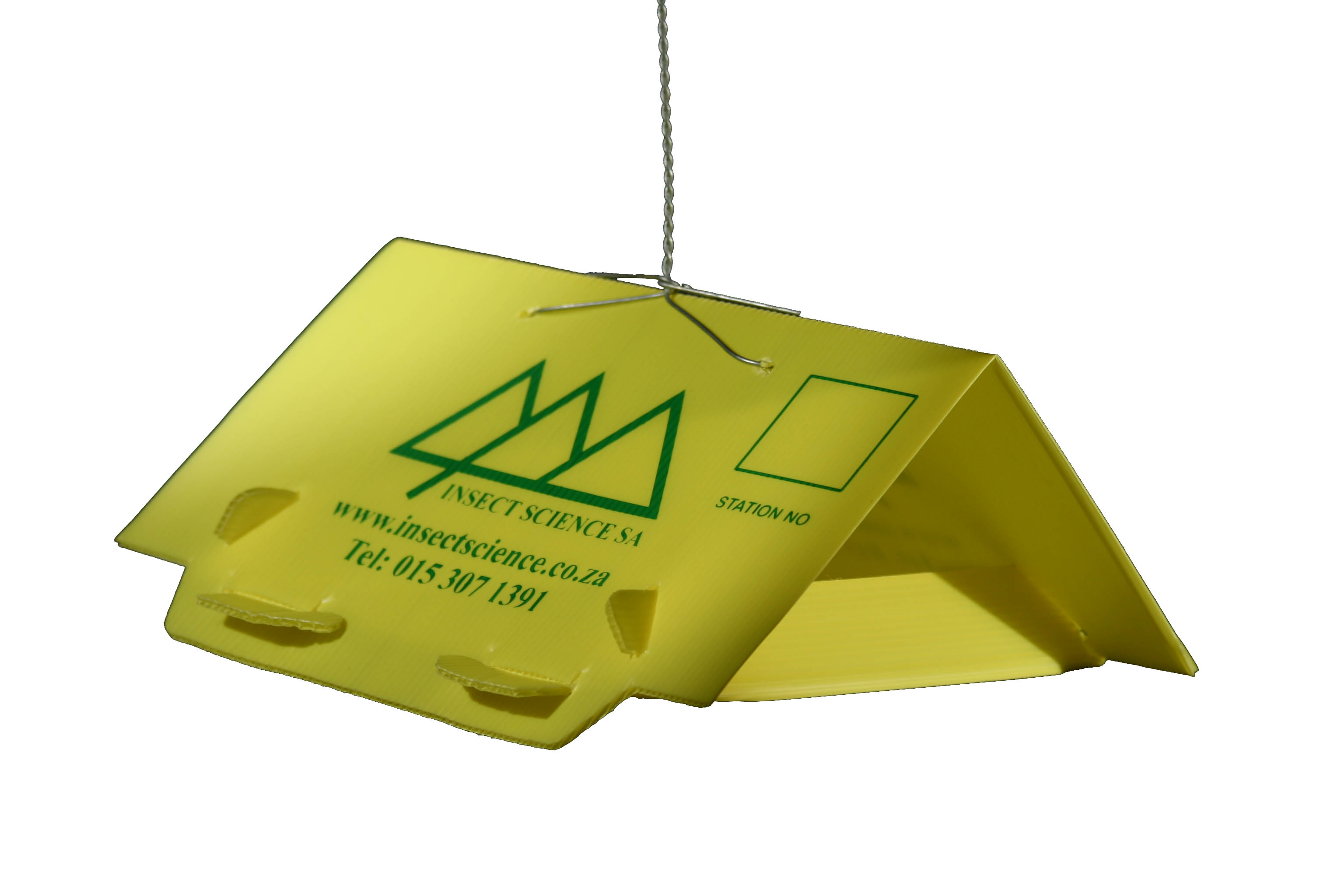
Yellow Delta Trap used in combination with female tomato leaf miner pheromone to monitor Tuta absoluta populations in tomato orchards.

The sex pheromone for T. absoluta has been identified by researchers at Cornell University and has been found to be highly attractive to male moths. Pheromone lures are used extensively throughout Europe, South America, North Africa and the Middle East for the monitoring and mass-trapping of T. absoluta. The use of pheromone products in combination with a yellow delta trap has been recorded in South Africa. This concept is used to monitor populations of T. absoluta in tomato orchards.

The combined use of pheromones as well as specific light frequency proved to be effective in suppressing the T. absoluta population and keeping it within the economic threshold as it disclosed by Russell IPM in a United Kingdom patent.

Also the use of electric mosquito traps give good results.

=== Insecticide resistance ===
==== History and genetics ====
Organophosphate and pyrethroid resistance developed in Chile, then in Brazil and (as noted above) Argentina. Spinosad resistance was also first noticed in Chile (possibly thanks to a cytochrome P450 and esterases), and then spinosad/spinetoram cross-resistance in Brazil due to two desensitizing mutations at the same target site: G275E, and an exon-skipping mutation; and perhaps synergistically with other factors.

Then came the Spanish detection in 2006. The biotype of this European invasion already carried at least 4 resistance mutations from a Chilean parental population: 3 in the relevant sodium channel for pyrethroids, including L1014F; and 1 (A201S) in the enzyme targeted by organophosphates.

Previously there had been little interest in this subject. Then about six years after the beginning of its invasion of Europe, there was a sharp increase in scientific recognition of - and interest in - resistance in T. absoluta, which only continued to build further year after year. In Aydın, Turkey in 2015, the T. absoluta population was found to be highly resistant to indoxacarb, spinosad, chlorantraniliprole, and metaflumizone, but not azadirachtin - while the Urla, İzmir population was only resistant to azadirachtin, and even then only weakly so. Many modes of action have fallen in efficacy in South America and Europe, closely in tandem with popularity of use of those MoAs/insecticides: Abamectin, cartap, indoxacarb, chitin biosynthesis inhibitors, spinosad, and the diamides. Only pyrethroid resistance has been confirmed to have declined. Only chlorfenapyr and Bt toxin have remained at low resistance, likely due to low usage. IRAC (the Insecticide Resistance Action Committee)'s efforts to slow resistance development and spread have been effective in Brazil and Spain, by way of widely disseminated information campaigns targeting the agricultural industries in the area.

It has been hypothesized that the flatness of the Brazilian savannah may be speeding up the spread of resistance alleles.

Interactions between T. absoluta, Bemisia tabaci, resistance, and Neoleucinodes elegantalis, and natural enemies of these pests remain underexplored. There are substantial gaps in knowledge that will need to be filled in the future.

===== Diamide resistance =====
The first report of diamide/ryanoid (IRAC group 28) failure was in 2015, and two years later a related team found this was occurring due to an altered target site due to the mutations G4903E and I4746 M. (These two mutations are parallels of two mutations found to be producing the same results in Plutella xylostella.) Altered binding affinity was found for the mutations G4903 V and I4746T, and they were found in a few resistant populations. In extreme (heterozygotic for resistant alleles) cases the normal application rate becomes hormetic. (The use of chlorantraniliprole for T. absoluta has also resulted in resistance in B. tabaci, even though it is not used against that species, merely because they co-occur on tomato. This is expected to make cyantraniliprole unusable if needed on B. tabaci, in the same area.)

===== Voltage-dependent sodium channel blocker resistance =====
Resistance to indoxacarb (IRAC group 22A) has appeared due to the mutations F1845Y and V1848I, but is not yet reported for another voltage-dependent sodium channel blocker, metafumizone (22B). (These two mutations, as with the diamides above, have P. xylostella analogues, but in this case these analogues are known to be effective against both indoxacarb and metafumizone.)

===== Nicotinic acetylcholine receptor channel blocker resistance =====
Cartap, a nicotinic acetylcholine receptor channel blocker (IRAC group 14), began to show low to moderate efficacy decline in South America starting in 2000, and increasing through at least 2016. Some of this is due to elevated cytochrome P450 activity (see below) possibly as part of demethylation and sulfoxidation detoxification, while less is thought to be due to esterases and glutathione S-transferases. (The use of cartap for T. absoluta has also resulted in resistance in B. tabaci, even though it is not used on that species, merely because they co-occur on tomato.)

===== Cytochrome P450 and resistance =====
Cytochrome P450s are used to resist:

- cartap,

- possibly as part of demethylation and sulfoxidation detoxification,

- possibly also abamectin

- along with resistance due to higher esterase activity,

- but not pyrethroids,

- because although important in other insects,
- they are of limited usefulness in this case for reasons still unknown,

but overall, specific information is still lacking connecting which particular P450s and which particular resistances.
