= Chlorantraniliprole =

Chemical compound

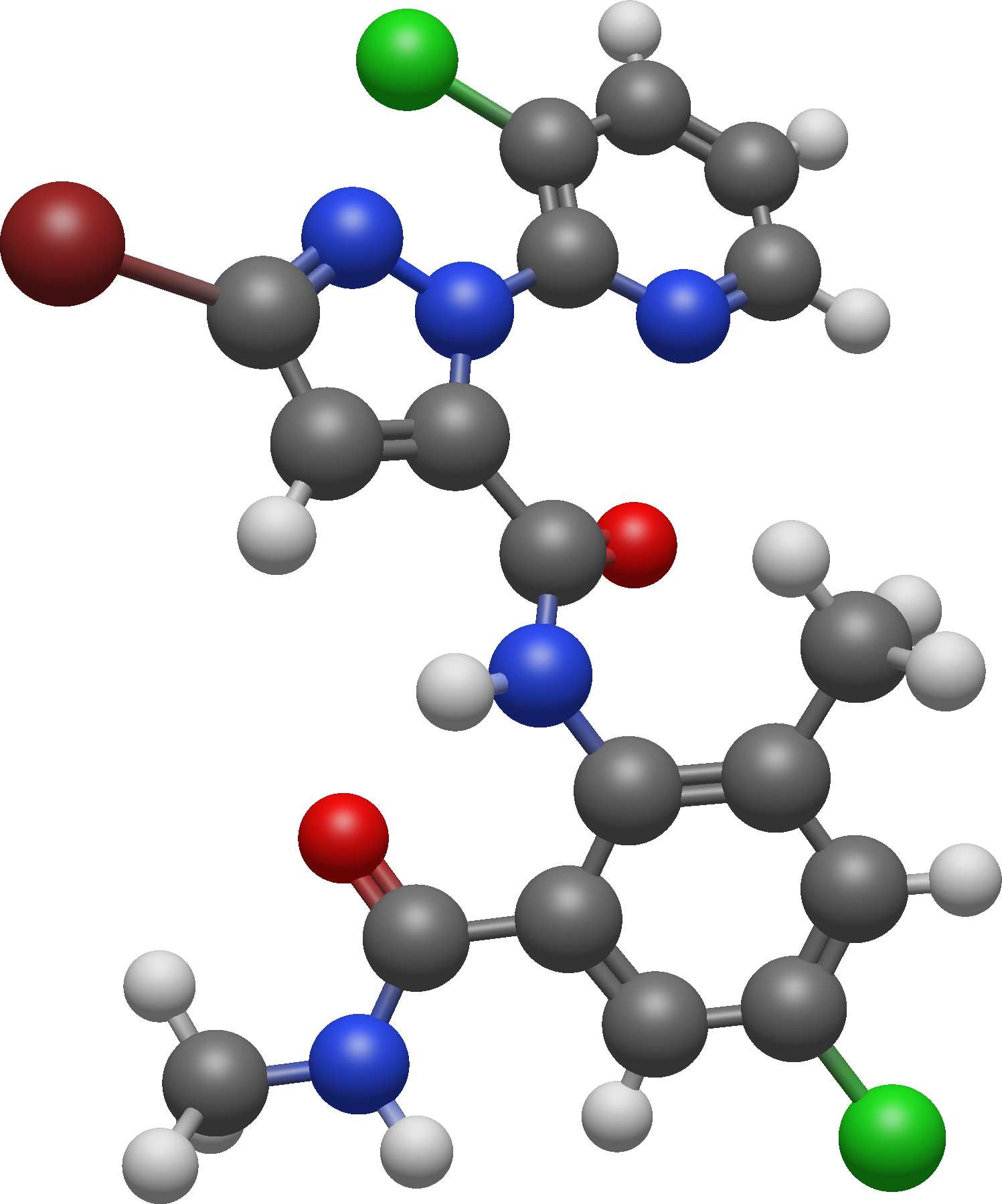
- Chlorantraniliprole 3D molecular model generated using Avogadro software

Names
- Preferred IUPAC name 3-Bromo-N-[4-chloro-2-methyl-6-(methylcarbamoyl)phenyl]-1-(3-chloropyridin-2-yl)-1H-pyrazole-5-carboxamide
- Other names Rynaxypyr, Coragen, Altacor

Identifiers
CAS Number	500008-45-7
3D model (JSmol)	Interactive image
Beilstein Reference	11247880
ChEBI	CHEBI:67113
ChEMBL	ChEMBL399318
ChemSpider	9446648
ECHA InfoCard	100.112.607
EC Number	610-489-8
KEGG	C18454
PubChem CID	11271640
UNII	622AK9DH9G
CompTox Dashboard (EPA)	DTXSID2044345
- InChI: InChI=1S/C18H14BrCl2N5O2/c1-9-6-10(20)7-11(17(27)22-2)15(9)24-18(28)13-8-14(19)25-26(13)16-12(21)4-3-5-23-16/h3-8H,1-2H3,(H,22,27)(H,24,28) Key: PSOVNZZNOMJUBI-UHFFFAOYSA-N
- SMILES: CC1=C(C(=CC(=C1)Cl)C(=O)NC)NC(=O)C2=CC(=NN2C3=C(C=CC=N3)Cl)Br

Properties
Chemical formula	C_{18}H_{14}BrCl_{2}N_{5}O_{2}
Molar mass	483.15 g·mol^{−1}
Melting point	209 °C (408 °F; 482 K)

Hazards
- GHS labelling
Pictograms	(GHS07: Exclamation mark) (GHS09: Environmental hazard)
Signal word	Warning
Hazard statements	H319, H335, H410
Precautionary statements	P261, P264, P271, P273, P280, P304+P340, P305+P351+P338, P312, P337+P313, P391, P403+P233, P405, P501
- Except where otherwise noted, data are given for materials in their standard state (at 25 °C [77 °F], 100 kPa). Infobox references

Chlorantraniliprole is an insecticide of the diamide class used for insects found on fruit and vegetable crops as well as ornamental plants.

== History ==
Chlorantraniliprole was introduced by DuPont Crop Protection in 2007.

== Mode of Action ==
Chlorantraniliprole has a mode of action similar to that of other ryanodine receptor modulators, such as flubendiamide and the structurally related cyantraniliprole. Chlorantraniliprole opens muscular calcium channels, in particular the ryanodine receptor. This rapidly causes paralysis and ultimately death of sensitive species (IRAC class 28). The differential selectivity chlorantraniliprole has towards insect ryanodine receptors explains its low mammalian toxicity. Chlorantraniliprole is active on chewing pest insects primarily by ingestion and secondarily by contact.

== Uses ==
Chlorantraniliprole is used in field crops and fruit cultivation, primarily as a spray application. It is particularly effective against chewing and sucking pests, including Codling moth, the Colorado potato beetle, and the grape berry moth.

== Toxicology ==
Animal studies have demonstrated that chlorantraniliprole has low toxicity to humans and other mammals, as well as to birds and fish. However, the active ingredient is highly toxic to insects and aquatic invertebrates. The European Food Safety Authority (EFSA) has established an acceptable daily intake of 1.56 mg/kg.

Despite its low toxicity to humans, a case of chlorantraniliprole poisoning has been reported in India.

== Analysis ==
Chlorantraniliprole can be reliably detected and quantified using liquid chromatography and gas chromatography. A mass spectrometer can be used for identification following chromatographic separation.

== Approval ==
Chlorantraniliprole is approved for use in most EU countries, including Germany, Austria, and Switzerland, where it is used in products such as the pesticide Coragen.

== Trade Names ==
- Coragen
- Rynaxypyr
- Altacor
- Prevathon
