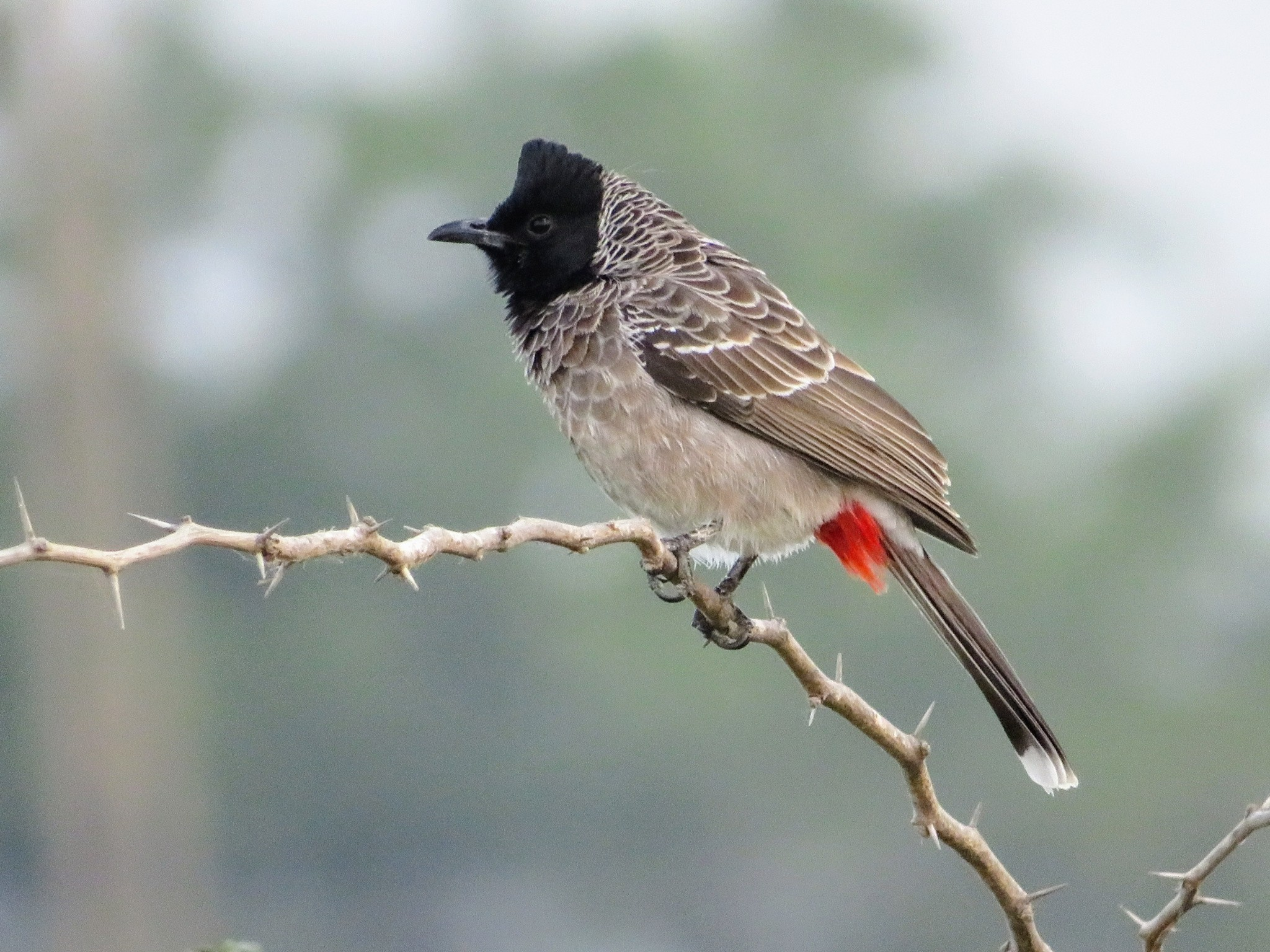
- Adult in winter morning

Conservation status
- Least Concern (IUCN 3.1)

Scientific classification
- Kingdom: Animalia
- Phylum: Chordata
- Class: Aves
- Order: Passeriformes
- Family: Pycnonotidae
- Genus: Pycnonotus
- Species: P. cafer

Binomial name
- Pycnonotus cafer (Linnaeus, 1766)
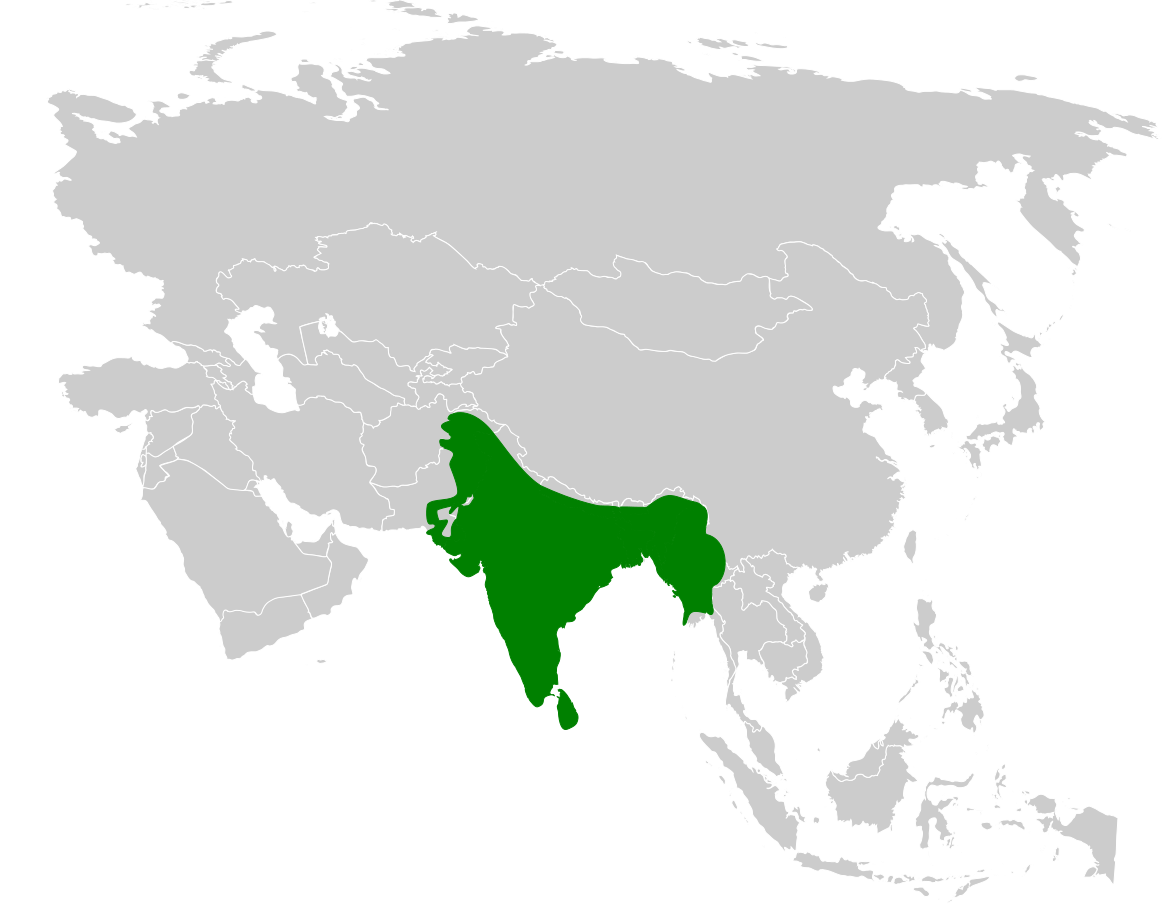

Synonyms
- Molpastes cafer (Linnaeus, 1766); Turdus cafer Linnaeus, 1766

Audio
- Calls

= Red-vented bulbul =

Species of bird

The red-vented bulbul (Pycnonotus cafer) is a member of the bulbul family of passerines. It is a resident breeder across South Asia extending east to Burma. It has been introduced in many other parts of the world and has established itself in Argentina, Tonga and Fiji, as well as parts of Samoa, USA and Cook Islands. It is included in the list of the world's 100 worst invasive alien species. In New Zealand they were the target of a successful extermination campaign in 1955, however they are still sporadically reported.

== Taxonomy and systematics ==
In 1760 the French zoologist Mathurin Jacques Brisson included a description of the red-vented bulbul in his Ornithologie based on a specimen that he mistakenly believed had been collected from the Cape of Good Hope in South Africa. He used the French name Le merle hupé du Cap de Bonne Espérance and the Latin Merula Cristata Capitis Bonae Spei. Although Brisson coined Latin names, these do not conform to the binomial system and are not recognised by the International Commission on Zoological Nomenclature. When in 1766 the Swedish naturalist Carl Linnaeus updated his Systema Naturae for the twelfth edition, he added 240 species that had been previously described by Brisson. One of these was the red-vented bulbul. Linnaeus included a brief description, coined the binomial name Turdus cafer and cited Brisson's work. The red-vented bulbul does not occur in Africa. The type location was later changed to Sri Lanka and then in 1952 designated as Pondicherry in India by the German naturalist Erwin Stresemann. The specific epithet cafer is Neo-Latin for South Africa. This species is now placed in the genus Pycnonotus that was introduced by the German zoologist Friedrich Boie in 1826.

Two formerly designated races, P. c. nigropileus in southern Burma and P. c. burmanicus of northern Burma, are now considered as hybrids.

=== Subspecies ===
Eight subspecies are recognized:

- Central Indian red-vented bulbul (P. c. humayuni) - Deignan, 1951: Found in south-eastern Pakistan, north-western and north-central India
- Punjab red-vented bulbul (P. c. intermedius) - Blyth, 1846: Originally described as a separate species. Found in Kashmir and Kohat down to the Salt Range and along the western Himalayas to Kumaon.
- P. c. bengalensis - Blyth, 1845: Originally described as a separate species. Found in the central and eastern Himalayas from Nepal to Assam, north-eastern India and Bangladesh
- P. c. stanfordi - Deignan, 1949: Found in northern Burma and south-western China
- P. c. melanchimus - Deignan, 1949: Found in south-central Burma and northern Thailand
- P. c. wetmorei - Deignan, 1960: Found in eastern India
  - P. c. saturatus - (Whistler & Kinnear, 1932): Originally described as a separate species Stelgidocichla latirostris saturata (Mearns 1914). Found in north-eastern India
- P. c. cafer - (Linnaeus, 1766): Found in southern India
- P. c. haemorrhousus - (Gmelin, JF, 1789): Found in Sri Lanka
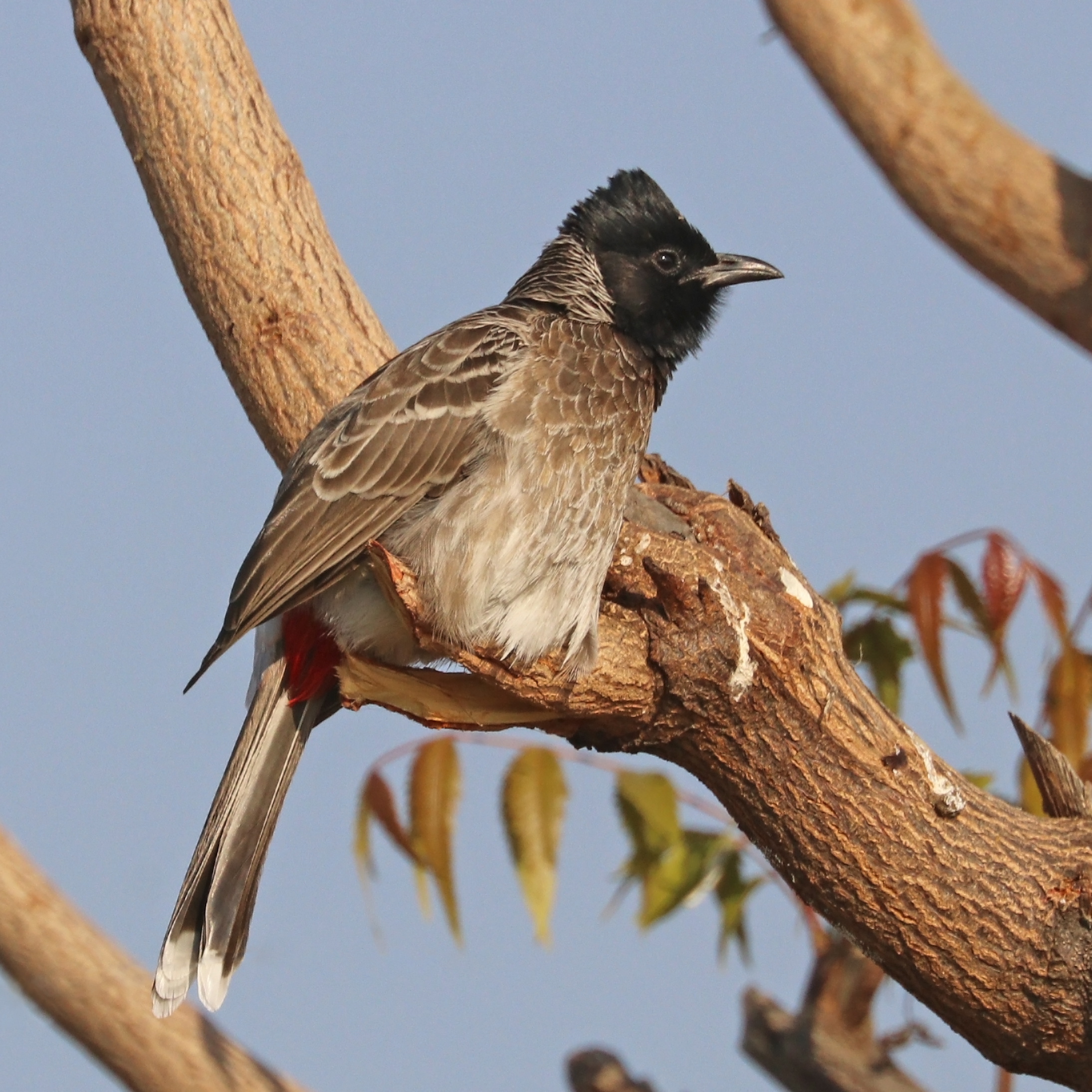
P. c. humayuni
Rajasthan, India

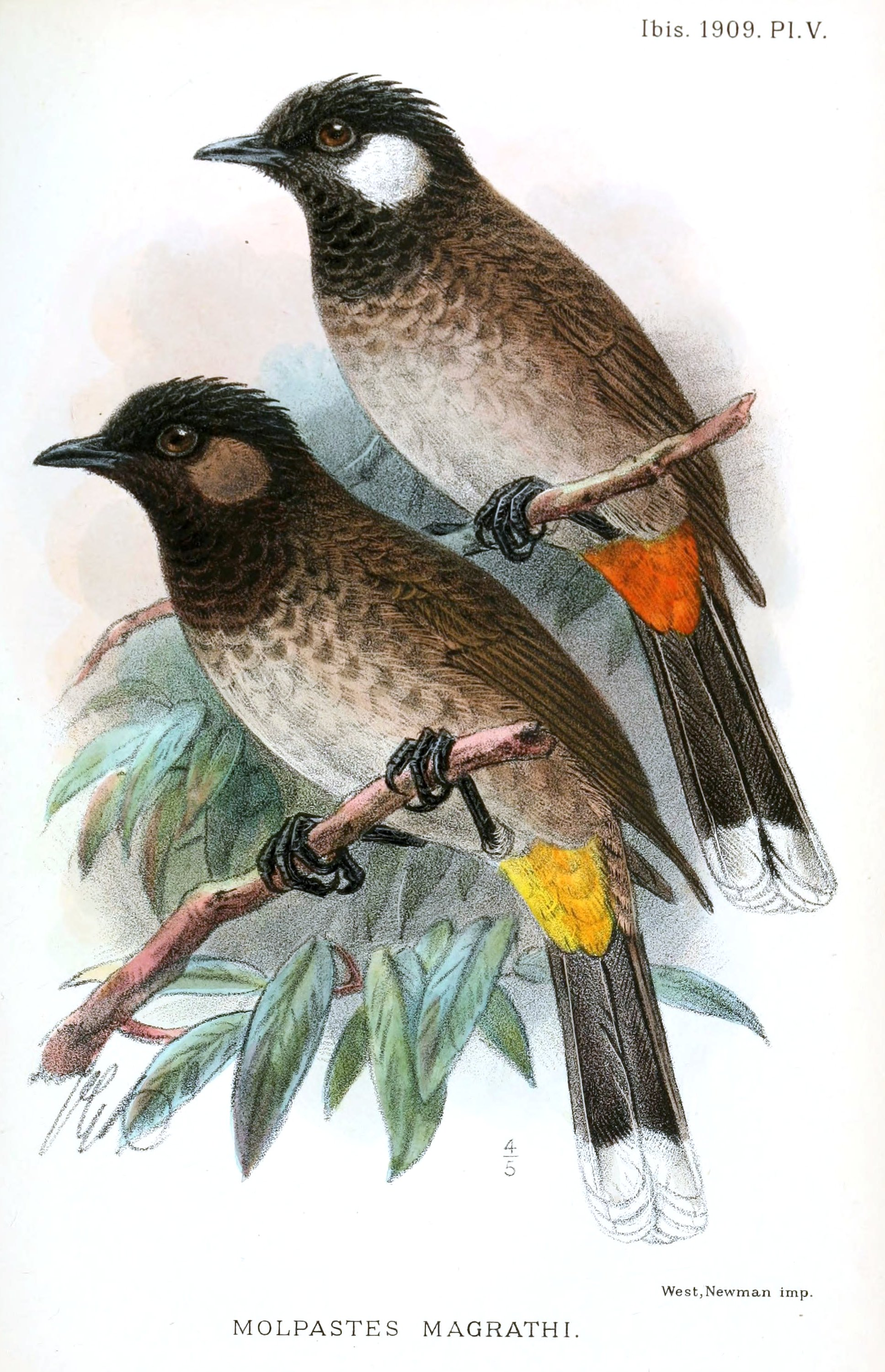
P. leucogenys x P. c. humayuni hybrid (magrathi)

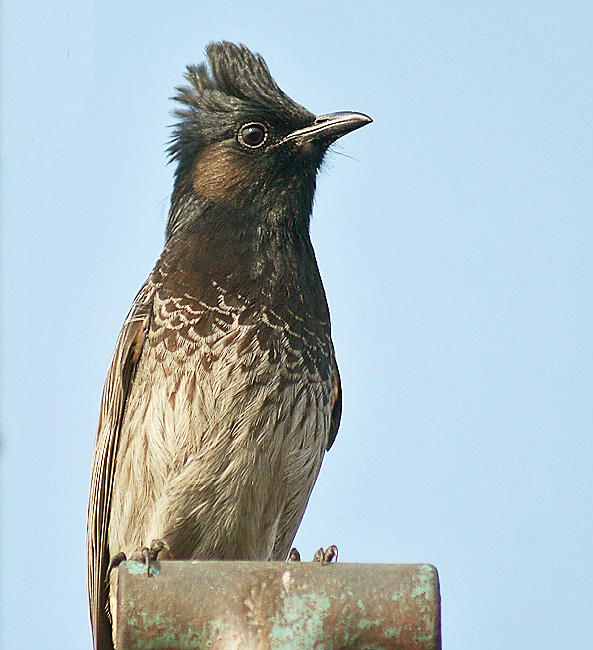
Underside of P. c. bengalensis

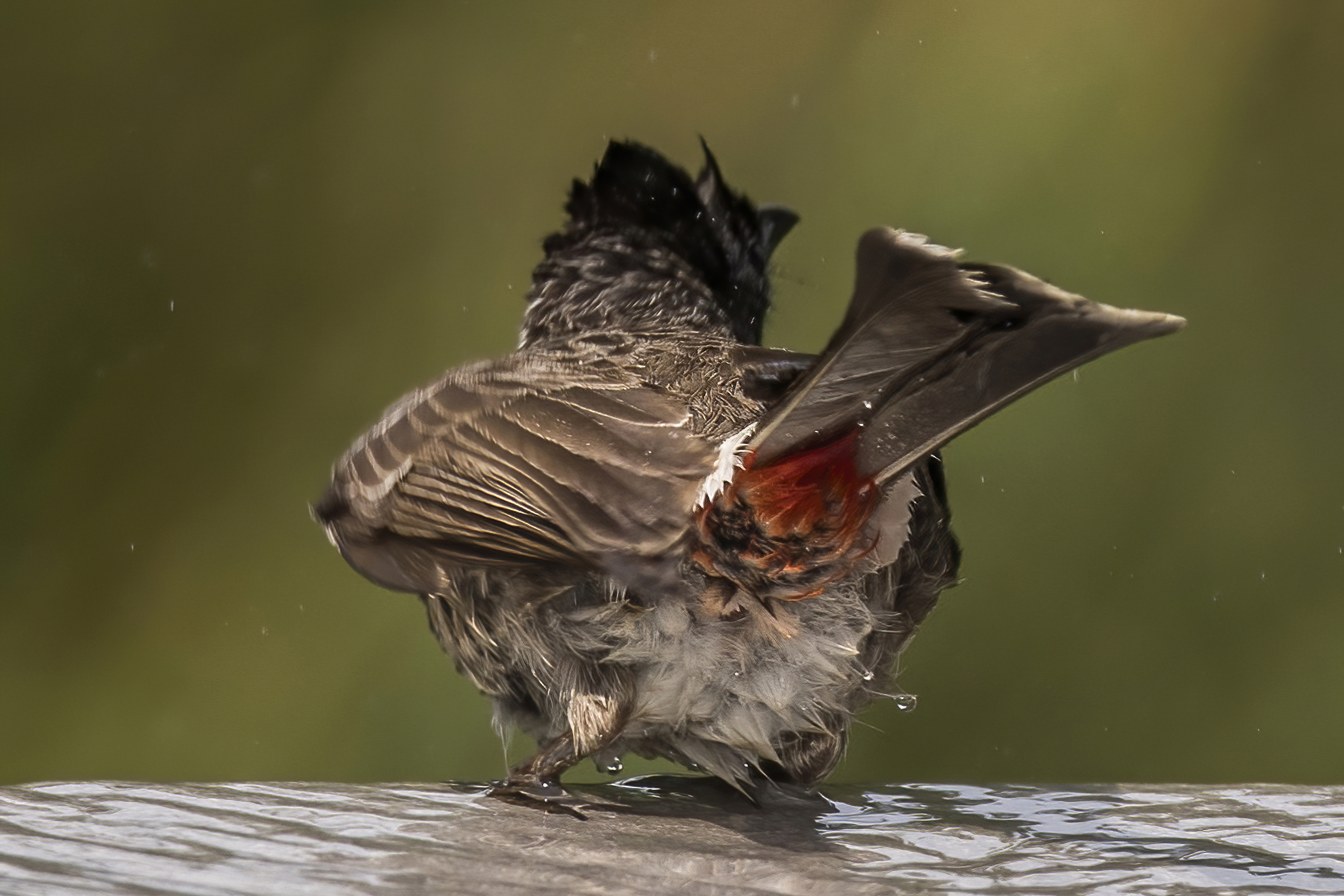
P. c. haemorrhousus showing vent, Sri Lanka.

== Description ==
The red-vented bulbul is easily identified by its short crest giving the head a squarish appearance. The body is dark brown with a scaly pattern while the head is darker or black. The rump is white while the vent is red. The bird is about 20 cm in length, with a long black tail, tipped in white. The Himalayan races have a more prominent crest and are more streaked on the underside. The race intermedius of the Western Himalayas has a black hood extending to the mid-breast. The population bengalensis of the Central and Eastern Himalayas and the Gangetic plain has a dark hood, lacks the scale-like pattern on the underside and instead has dark streaks on the paler lower belly. Race stanfordi of the South Assam hills is similar to intermedius. The desert race humayuni has a paler brown mantle. The nominate race cafer is found in Peninsular India. The Northeast Indian race wetmorei is between cafer, humayuni and bengalensis. The Sri Lankan race haemorrhous (=haemorrhousus) has a dark mantle with narrow pale edges. Race humayuni is known to hybridize with Pycnonotus leucogenys and these hybrids were once described as a subspecies magrathi marked by their pale rumps and yellow-orange or pink vents. In eastern Myanmar there is some natural hybridization with Pycnonotus aurigaster.

Sexes are similar in plumage, but young birds are duller than adults. The typical call has been transcribed as ginger beer, but a number of sharp single note calls sounding like pick are also produced. Their alarm calls are usually responded to and heeded by many other species of bird.

Melanistic as well as leucistic individuals have been noted. An individual with aberrant colour form was observed in Bhavans College Campus, Andheri, Mumbai.

== Distribution and habitat ==
This is a bird of dry scrub, open forest, plains and cultivated lands. In its native range it is rarely found in mature forests. A study based on 54 localities in India concluded that vegetation is the single most important factor that determines the distribution of the species.

Red-vented bulbuls were introduced into Fiji in 1903 by indentured labourers from India, becoming widespread. They were introduced to Tonga in 1943 and became common on Samoa by 1957. They became established on the Tongan islands of Tongatapu and Niuafo'ou. They were introduced into Melbourne around 1917 but were not seen after 1942. They established in Auckland in the 1950s but were exterminated and another wild population was detected and exterminated in 2006. In 2013 more were found, and authorities offered a $1000 reward for information that led to a bird's capture. They prefer dry lowland habitat in these regions. They were first observed breeding on the Canary Islands in 2018. They are considered as pests because of their habit of damaging fruit crops. Methiocarb and ziram have been used to protect cultivated Dendrobium orchids in Hawaii from damage by these birds; however, they learn to avoid the repellent chemicals. They can also disperse the seeds of invasive plants like Lantana camara and Miconia calvescens.

P. cafer is invasive in New Caledonia. Thibault et al. (2018) finds this species to be pushing out native species but not other introduced species.

== Behaviour and ecology ==
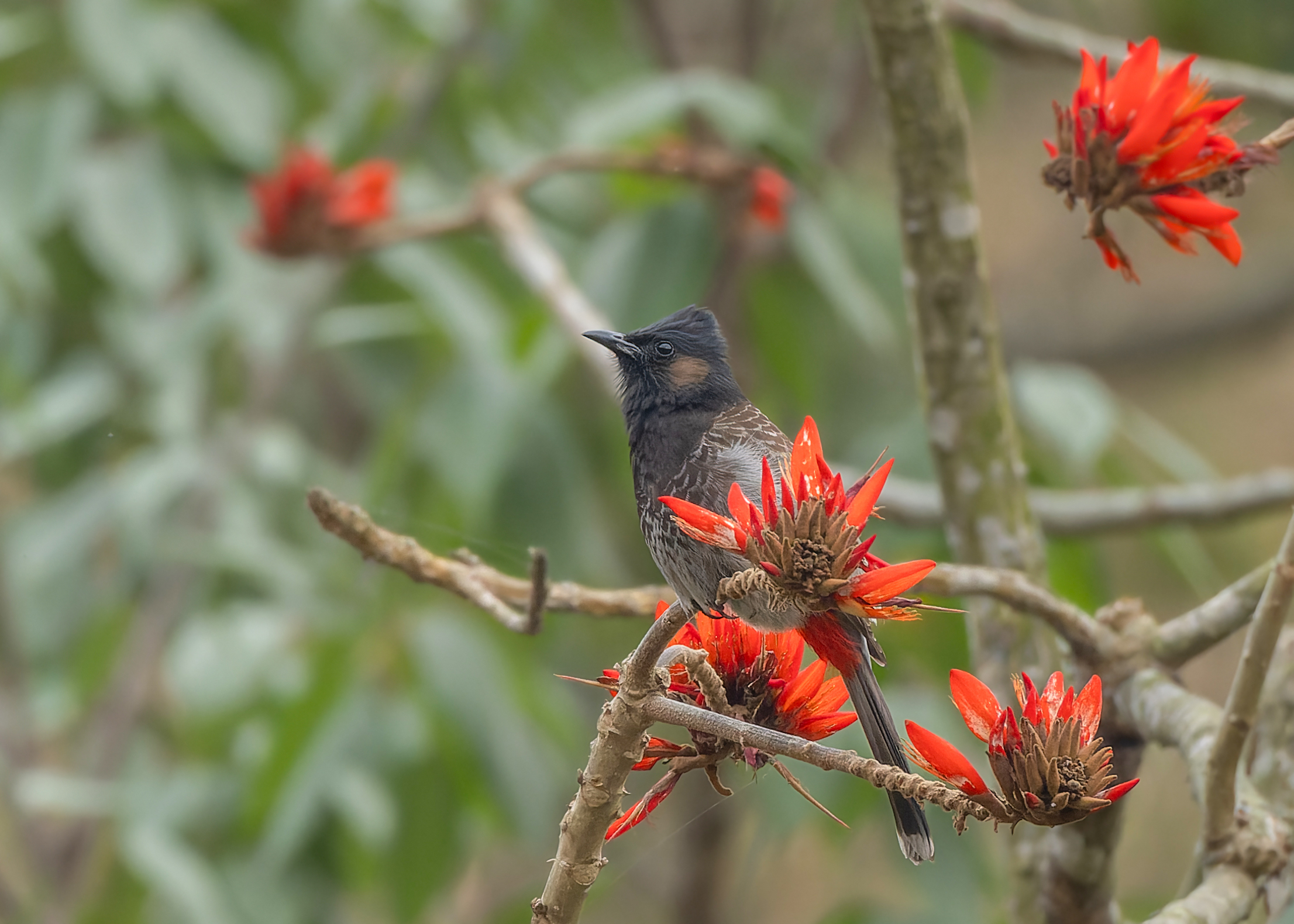
Red-vented Bulbul (Pycnonotus cafer) on Indian coral tree (erythrina variegata) in Tabakoshi, West Bengal, India.

Red-vented bulbuls feed on fruits, petals of flowers, nectar, insects and occasionally house geckos (Hemidactylus flaviviridis). They have also been seen feeding on the leaves of Medicago sativa.

Red-vented bulbuls build their nests in bushes at a height of around 2–3 m (6.6–9.8 ft). Nests are occasionally built inside houses or in a hole in a mud bank. In one instance, a nest was found on a floating mat of Water hyacinth leaves and another observer noted a pair nesting inside a regularly used bus. Nests in tree cavities have also been noted. Nesting in safe cavities of residential buildings has also been noted.

They breed from June to September and lay two or three eggs in a typical clutch. The eggs are pale-pinkish with spots of dark red color which are more dense at the broad end. However, in one instance, breeding has also been observed in February in Tamil Nadu. They are capable of having multiple clutches in a year. Nests are small flat cups made of small dry twigs and spider web, but sometimes making use of metal wires. The eggs hatch after about 14 days. Both parents feed the chicks and on feeding trips wait for the young to excrete, swallowing the faecal sacs produced for the first few days when the bacterial level is minimum. Later they carry the faecal sacs and dump them elsewhere. The pied crested cuckoo is a brood parasite of this species. Fires, heavy rains and predators are the main causes of fledgling mortality in scrub habitats in southern India.

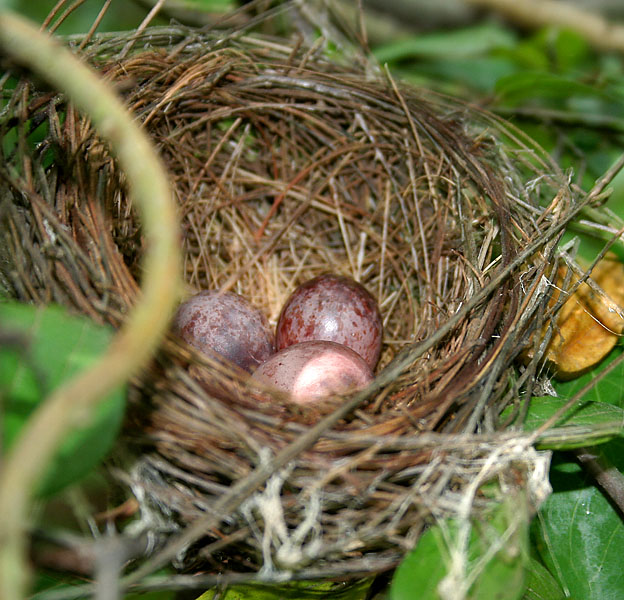
Eggs inside the nest

Their vocalizations are usually stereotyped and they call throughout the year. However, a number of distinct call types have been identified including roosting, begging, greeting, flight and two kinds of alarm calls.

They are important dispersers of seeds of plants such as Carissa spinarum.

The red-vented bulbul was among the first animals other than humans that was found to be incapable of synthesizing vitamin C. However, a large number of other birds were later found to likewise lack the ability to synthesize vitamin C.

Like most birds, these bulbuls are hosts to coccidian blood parasites (Isospora sp.) while some bird lice such as Menacanthus guldum (Ansari 1951 Proc. Natl. Inst. Sci. India 17:40) have been described as ectoparasites.

Along with red-whiskered bulbuls this species has led to changes in the population dynamics of butterfly morphs on the island of Oahu in Hawaii. Here the population of white morphs of the Danaus plexippus butterfly has risen over a period of 20 years due to predation of the orange morphs by these bulbuls.

== In culture ==
In 19th-century India these birds were frequently kept as cage pets and for fighting especially in the Carnatic region. They would be held on the finger with a thread attached and when they fought they would seize the red feathers of the opponents.

Indians frequently tame it and carry it about the bazaars, tied with a string to the finger or to a little crutched perch, which is often made of precious metals or jade; while there are few Europeans who do not recollect Eha's immortal phrase anent the red patch in the seat of its trousers.

— Hugh Whistler

In the state of Assam, India, (the Bulbul (বুলবুলী) bird as it is known in Assamese), the male birds were held captive for a few days and were engaged in fights as a spectator sport in the Bihu festival during the Ahom rule. This practice was banned in January 2016.
