= Methiocarb =

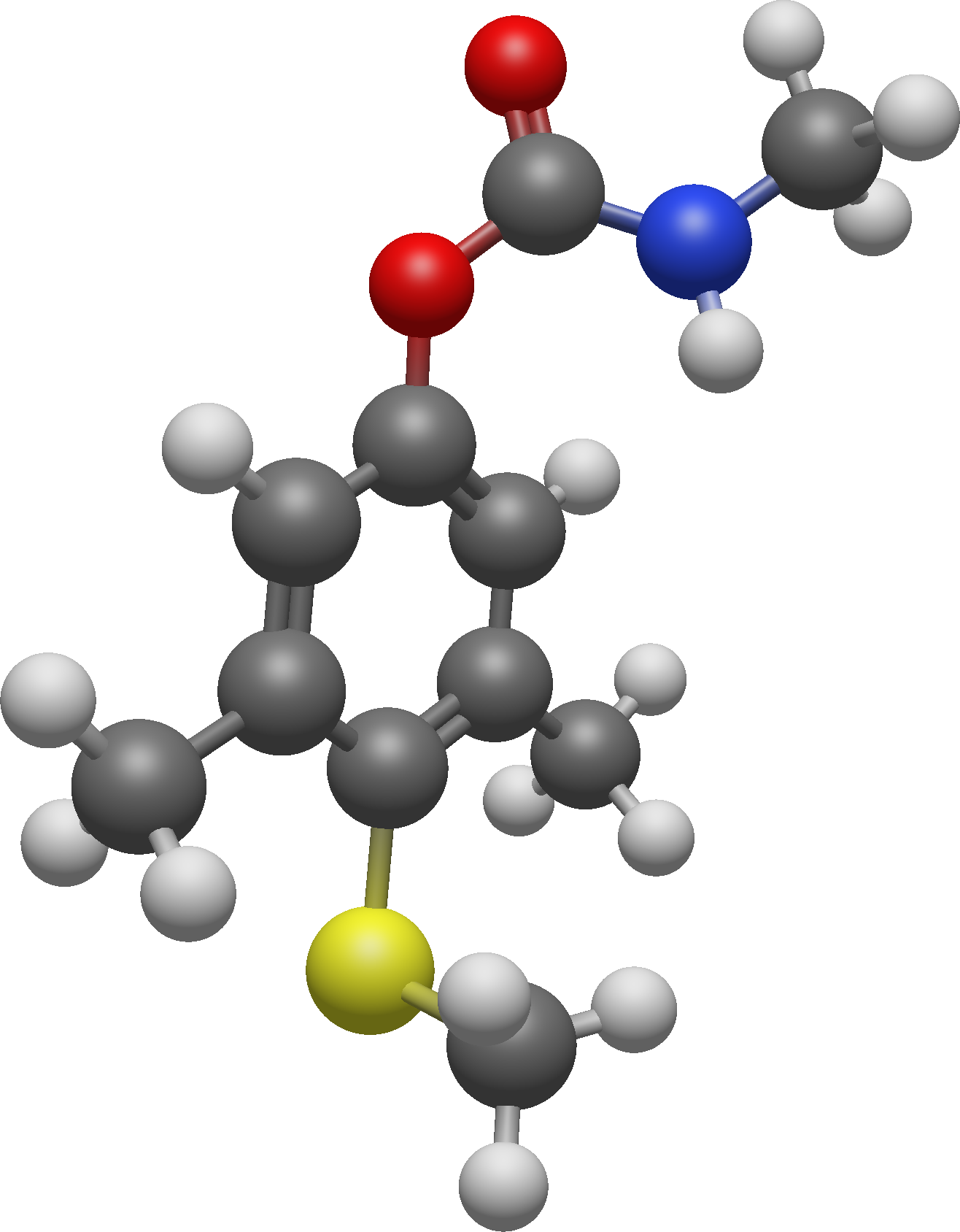

Names
- Preferred IUPAC name 3,5-Dimethyl-4-(methylsulfanyl)phenyl methylcarbamate
- Other names Mercaptodimethur; Mesurol

Identifiers
CAS Number	2032-65-7
3D model (JSmol)	Interactive image; Interactive image
Beilstein Reference	1881431
ChEBI	CHEBI:38508
ChEMBL	ChEMBL1076495
ChemSpider	15417
ECHA InfoCard	100.016.357
EC Number	217-991-2
KEGG	C18651
MeSH	Methiocarb
PubChem CID	16248
UNII	JI9431OS31
CompTox Dashboard (EPA)	DTXSID3032626
- InChI: InChI=1S/C11H15NO2S/c1-7-5-9(14-11(13)12-3)6-8(2)10(7)15-4/h5-6H,1-4H3,(H,12,13) Key: YFBPRJGDJKVWAH-UHFFFAOYSA-N
- SMILES: O=C(Oc1cc(c(SC)c(c1)C)C)NC; O=C(Oc1cc(c(SC)c(c1)C)C)NC

Properties
Chemical formula	C_{11}H_{15}NO_{2}S
Molar mass	225.312
Appearance	Colourless crystals
Density	1.25 g cm^{−3}
Melting point	118.5 °C (245.3 °F; 391.6 K)
Boiling point	311 °C (592 °F; 584 K) (degrades at 300 °C or 572 °F or 573 K)
Solubility in water	0.027 g L^{−1}
Solubility in Xylene	20 g L^{−1}
Solubility in Acetone	144 g L^{−1}
Solubility in Ethyl acetate	87 g L^{−1}
Solubility in 1-Octanol	31 g L^{−1}
log P	3.18
Vapor pressure	.015 mPa
Henry's law constant (k_{H})	.12 mPa m^{3} mol^{−1}

Hazards
- Occupational safety and health (OHS/OSH)
Main hazards	Skin irritant, neurotoxin
Flash point	Not highly flammable
- Except where otherwise noted, data are given for materials in their standard state (at 25 °C [77 °F], 100 kPa). verify (what is ?) Infobox references

Methiocarb is a carbamate pesticide (an acetylcholinesterase inhibitor) which is used as an insecticide, bird repellent, acaricide and molluscicide since the 1960s. Methiocarb has contact and stomach action on mites and neurotoxic effects on molluscs. Seeds treated with methiocarb also affect birds. Other names for methiocarb are mesurol and mercaptodimethur.

Due to its toxicity, methiocarb approval as a plant protection product has been withdrawn by the EU effective 2020.

== Structure and reactivity ==
The carbamate functional group in methiocarb can be cleaved by cholinesterase to result in the carbamate, which binds to the cholinesterase, and the phenol.

== Synthesis ==
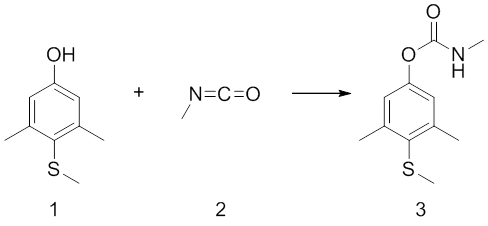

Methiocarb (3) is synthesised by Bayer from 4-methylthio-3,5-xylenol (1) and methyl isocyanate (2). The xylenol (1) will act as the nucleophile in this reaction attacking the partially positively charged carbon in the isocyanate (2).

== Mechanism of action ==
Methiocarb acts by acetylcholinesterase inhibition. The product of the cleavage of the carbamate group of methiocarb is methylcarbamic acid which is bound to cholinesterase after the reaction. The normal function of cholinesterase is to cleave the acetyl-choline bond which results in the binding of acetic acid to cholinesterase which is a fast reversible reaction. The carbamic acid also reversibly binds but the hydrolysis of the bond is slower and therefore the acid inhibits the function of cholinesterase which results in elevated acetylcholine levels. In comparison: organophosphates inhibit irreversibly and will therefore inhibit the acetylcholinesterase even more.

In addition to its cholinergic effects, methiocarb has been found to be an endocrine disruptor, acting as an estrogen, antiandrogen, and aromatase inhibitor.

== Metabolism ==
Methiocarb is biotransformed in the liver mainly by sulfoxidation. This can happen to methiocarb itself but also to the phenol group which is cleaved from methiocarb by choline-esterase. In some cases this same sulfur can be oxidised once more to give the sulfone. A minor pathway that occurs is the hydroxylation of the N-methyl.

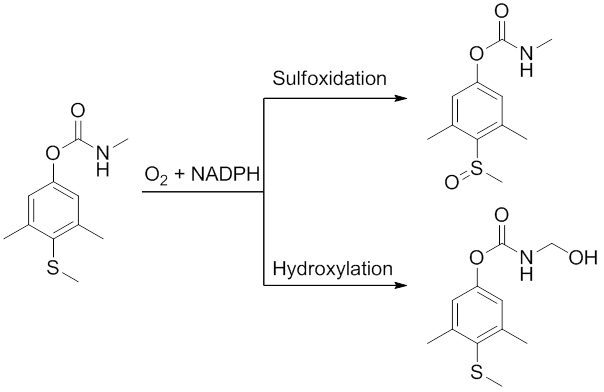

== Absorption ==
Methiocarb can be taken up through different routes. The most common for humans is up take through the skin or as an aerosol, because of its use as a pesticide in agriculture. For insects and birds this would be by the oral route. The NOAEL's of these routes have been determined as follows: For the oral route, the NOAEL is set to 3.3 mg/kg per day for rats, based on a 2-year study. For absorption through the skin the NOAEL is set to 150 mg/kg per day for rabbits, based on the reduction of food consumption.

When methiocarb is fed to rats at a dose of 50 ppm, it gives a reduction of brain cholinesterase by 14% and 5% in males and females respectively. When methiocarb is administered as an aerosol to rats, the highest concentration (96 mg/m3 in solvent) showed signs of involuntary muscle contraction (tremors). These signs weren't observed in the other groups. The brain acetylcholine esterase is reduced in comparison to the solvent controls, to 61% and 74% for males and females respectively. There were no changes in organ weight. The NOAEL was determined to be 6 mg/m3 based on the reduction of brain acetylcholine esterase activity.

== Distribution ==
To determine the distribution of methiocarb through the body carbon-14 ([^{14}C]) labeled methiocarb studies have been performed on rats. About 8 hours after IP injection of [^{14}C]methiocarb more than 20 is present in the kidneys, 14 in the lungs, 14 in the heart, 6 in the body fat and 26 in the red blood cells. All the numbers are a measure of the radioactivity in dpm x 103/g of dried tissue. 30 Minutes after treatment gave, for all tissues except bodyfat, much higher values indicating that elimination takes place shortly after injection. Also, an increase in all tissues except the red blood cells has been observed between 2 and 4 hours after injection. This indicates that after two hours redistribution takes place shortly followed by elimination. This radioactivity study only measured the [^{14}C] so the compound could already be metabolized to different compounds with different toxicities, which is not indicated in this study.

== Toxicity ==
Exposure	Acute toxicity
Dermal LD_{50}(mg/kg bodyweight)
Rabbit	>2000
Rat	>200
Inhalation (1 hour) LC_{50}(mg/m^{3})
Rat	1200
Intraperitoneal LD_{50}(mg/kg bodyweight)
Mouse	6
Oral LD_{50}(mg/kg bodyweight)
Dog	10
Guinea Pig	40
Mouse	25
Rat	30

=== Short term toxicity ===
In rats the cholinesterase activity fell down to 50 percent of the control values in 27 days where the dose applied in their diet was 2 mg/ kg bw in the first three days and 4 mg/kg bw for the next 24 days. No abnormal clinical signs were observed. In rabbits methiocarb was applied to the skin to a group of ten at doses of 0, 60, 150 or 375 mg/kg bw per day for 6 h/day. Two out of ten rabbits with the low dose did not survive and with the high dose had a reduced food consumption. Cholinesterase activity was reduced in males with a high dose at 14 and 21 days of treatment. There were no intergroup differences observed in cholinesterase activity among females. The erythrocyte acetylcholinesterase activity is apparently not inhibited in a dose-related fashion. The duration of the study was 24 days.

=== Long term toxicity ===
In mice, a one-year study of 50 males and 50 females was performed. The mice received diets containing methiocarb at doses of 0, 15, 43 and 130 mg/kg bw per day in males and 0, 20, 57, and 170 mg/kg bw per day in females. Food consumption, behaviour and mortality rate were not affected at any dose. At one month the decrease in plasma acetylcholinesterase activity was the highest and the smallest reductions were observed at 24 months. Brain acetylcholinesterase activity was also lowered, more in males than in females. In rats a two-year study of 60 rats was performed. The rats received diets containing 0, 3.3, 9.3 and 29 mg/kg bw per day for males and 0, 5, 14, and 42 mg/kg bw per day for females. Food consumption, behaviour and mortality rate were not affected at any dose. The total protein concentrations were raised at higher doses of methiocarb. The plasma acetylcholinesterase activity was lowered at the high dose at day one and from eight weeks onwards in males and at day one and 1, 2, 4 and 13 weeks in females. No brain acetylcholinesterase activity was observed.

=== Environmental toxicity ===
Because methiocarb is widely used as an insecticide on crops, environmental risks were also studied to establish safety risks for human health. The metabolism of methiocarb in plants, soil and water have been proposed from radiolabeled [^{14}C]methiocarb studies. In plants, the major metabolites were methiocarb sulfoxide and methiocarb sulfoxide phenol. Environmental fate in water and soil has been determined from the metabolites formed by anaerobic as well as aerobic degradation, photolysis, adsorption and leaching of methiocarb. In soil the half life of methiocarb sulfone phenol is 20 days, methiocarb sulfoxide phenol is 2 days, methiocarb 1.5 days and methiocarb sulfoxide 6 days. Methiocarb is mainly metabolized to methiocarb phenol and minor to methiocarb sulfoxide and methiocarb sulfoxide phenol. Also after 217 days no methiocarb or metabolites are present anymore in the soil. This is because a lot of gets metabolized to CO_{2}. In water, no methiocarb was present already after 32 days. The half-life of methiocarb in water is strongly pH dependent but at pH 7 the half-life is about 28 days.

== Efficacy ==
Methiocarb is used as toxin for different purposes. It ranges from snails, insects, rodents and even as a bird repellent. As an insecticide it is effective for thrips and has a low dose that is lethal for these animals. The LC_{99,99} for suspension concentrate is 0.34 g/L and for the wettable powder it is 2.30, which is a bit too much for effective use.

For the use as a molluscicide methiocarb is effective, but at a high dose. In a research with E. vermiculata, methiocarb showed to be the most effective as topical applicant (although DMSO was used as a solvent). The LD_{50} is 414 μg per snail and the LD_{99,99} is roughly estimated 1400 μg per snail for methiocarb. In comparison to methomyl which was more effective, with its LD_{50} was 90 μg per snail. Which is a lot lower than the LD_{50} of methiocarb.

As snail bait methiocarb has the same effectiveness as methomyl for 1% (mass percent) and 2%. but the LC_{50} of methiocarb is higher than the one of methomyl. 0.93:0.31. They both reached an average mortality of 85%, by the use of 2% methiocarb/methomyl bait.

In another comparison study (with Monacha obstructa) between methiocarb and methomyl. Methomyl showed again to be more effective. The LD_{50} in this study were 12 μg per snail for methomyl and 27 μg per snail for methiocarb. These compound were topically applied on the snails and these compounds were first dissolved in 95% ethanol and diluted with water to make the concentrations.

As an avian repelled to protect fruit, methiocarb was in one research not effective. The birds still damaged the figs. This happened because the methiocarb was sprayed on the fruit. The birds pinched the fruits or peeled the skin of the fruit and ate the meat of the figs. In that manner these birds are very little or not exposed to the repellent.

In another study with quelea, it was investigated if methiocarb had an adverse effect on the food choice. It showed that when quelea ate seeds with methiocarb, the next time they would choose some other food. This shows that methiocarb can be effective as a bird repellent.

In one study methiocarb is shown to be not very effective against mice as a rodenticide. In the first field trial, snail pellets of methiocarb were spread across the land and killed almost 23% of the initial mice population in one night, but the population did not decrease (probably because of reinvasion of the neighbouring land). There hasn't been searched for carcasses after that, but birds were seen scavenging on carcasses. In the second field trial, grain was covered in methiocarb and strychnine and it showed a mortality rate of 40% for methiocarb and 90% for strychnine. Although methiocarb seems to be effective at first. Mice develop an aversion for the methiocarb, which makes it not very effective as rodenticide.

== Suicidal poisoning ==
Methiocarb is a plant protection agent and while suicide with these types of toxins is rare, there is one case reported of a suicide with methiocarb. An 80-year-old woman in Germany killed herself by drinking a bottle of Mesurol. The red/pink fluid was on her clothes, face, and hands (probably because of the vomiting) and in the gastrointestinal tract as in the respiratory tract. The toxicological examination showed that the methiocarb uptake wasn't completed and the concentration of methiocarb and its metabolite in the urine was low. This is due to the short duration of exposure. Elevated concentration of methiocarb may be the result of post-mortem uptake, but it could also be the post-mortem redistribution of methiocarb and metabolites from the gastrointestinal tract. The conclusion of the toxicological examination was death by acute poisoning of methiocarb.

The amount of methiocarb in the stomach is calculated to compare it with the LD_{50} of rats. The amount of methiocarb is estimated to have been 6.1 gram (by a stomach volume of 1L). The weight of this woman was 53 kg. That would make 115 mg/kg bw. When compared to the LD_{50} for rats, which is 30 mg/kg, it is reasonable to say that this woman died of poisoning from methiocarb. Bear in mind that this is only the amount of methiocarb found in the stomach and that the rest was already methiocarb distributed through the body.

Matrix	Concentration of methiocarb	Semiquantative detection of methiocarb-metabolite^{†}	Concentration ratio methiocarb/metabolite
Stomach	6100 μg/mL	65 μg/mL	94:1
Liver	25 μg/g	10 μg/g	2.5:1
Kidney	11 μg/g	Not detected	-
Heart blood	4.0 μg/mL	3.6 μg/g	1.1:1
Femoral vein blood	Not detected	12 μg/mL	-
Brain	2.5 μg/g	Not detected	-
Bile	2.0 μg/g	Not detected	-
Urine	1.9 μg/mL	1.5 μg/mL	1.3:1

†Semiquantitative analysis was performed by the approximation of similar extinction coefficients of mercaptodimethur and its metabolite descarbamoylmercaptodimethur at wavelength 200 nm.

== See also ==
- Methiocarb in the Pesticide Properties DataBase (PPDB)
