= Biopesticide =

Several types of pest management intervention

A biopesticide is a biological substance or microorganism that is used to control pests. Invertebrates and macroorganisms used to control pests are usually categorised as biological pest control agents.

Biopesticides are traditionally obtained through bioprospecting from organisms including plants, microorganisms, etc. They are components of integrated pest management programmes, and are used as substitutes for synthetic pesticides.

== Definitions ==
- the EU defines biopesticides as "a form of pesticide based on micro-organisms or natural products".
- the US EPA states that they "include naturally occurring substances that control pests (biochemical pesticides), microorganisms that control pests (microbial pesticides), and pesticidal substances produced by plants containing added genetic material (plant-incorporated protectants) or PIPs".
- invertebrates (parasitoids, nematodes, predatory mites, and other beneficials) and other macroorganisms) are registered by the authorities in the US and Europe as biological control agents very differently to biopesticides. In the scientific literature, however, they are sometimes referred to as biopesticides. Similarly microorganisms may also be described as biological control agents.

== Market ==
Global sales of biopesticides in 2024 were nearly $9.0 billion, compared to $78 billion for synthetic pesticides. The biopesticide market has a >10% growth rate and will equal that of synthetic pesticides in 2040 if that rate were to continue. Most use is in vegetable and covered crop, but Brazil, a country with a huge growth due to government support, has large use in field crops. In contrast to manufacturers of synthetic pesticides, there are many (>300) manufacturers of biopesticides worldwide. The largest segment is bioinsecticides, followed by biofungicides, and bioherbicides with only 1% of the biopesticide market. Van Lenteren supplied a list of organisms used for biocontrol.

== Types ==
Biopesticides are biodegradable and renewable. Organic farming systems adopts some of these methods (microbial and bio-derived chemicals) and disallows others (GM-crops and RNAi).

Biopesticides can be classified thusly:

- Microbial pesticides consist of bacteria, entomopathogenic fungi or viruses (and sometimes includes the metabolites that bacteria or fungi produce).
- Bio-derived chemicals. Pesticidal chemicals or mixtures containing them obtained from plants and microorganisms. In commercial use are pyrethrum, rotenone, azadirachtin, neem oil, and various essential oils which are naturally occurring substances that control (or monitor in the case of pheromones) pests and microbial disease.
- Plant-incorporated protectants (PIPs) incorporate genetic material from other species (i.e. GM crops). They are banned in most European countries.
- RNAi pesticides, some of which are topical and some of which are absorbed by the crop.

=== RNA interference ===
RNA interference (RNAi) uses segments of RNA to fatally silence crucial insect genes. In 2024 two uses of RNAi have been registered by the authorities for use: Genetic modification of a crop to introduce a gene coding for an RNAi fragment and spraying double stranded RNA fragments onto a field. Monsanto introduced the trait DvSnf7 which expresses a double-stranded RNA transcript containing a 240 bp fragment of the WCR Snf7 gene of the Western corn rootworm. GreenLight Biosciences introduced Ledprona, a formulation of double stranded RNA as a spray for potato fields. It targets the essential gene for proteasome subunit beta type-5 (PSMB5) in the Colorado potato beetle. Other applications against insects, mites, fungi, viruses, and plants are still in the research and development phase.

=== Mycopesticide ===
Mycopesticides include fungi and fungi cell components. Propagules such as conidia, blastospores, chlamydospores, oospores, and zygospores have been evaluated, along with hydrolytic enzyme mixtures. The role of hydrolytic enzymes especially chitinases in the killing process, and the possible use of chitin synthesis inhibitors are the prime research areas.

=== Nanoencapsulation ===
Nanoencapsulation is an emerging formulation technology for biopesticides that encloses active biological ingredients within nanoscale carriers, typically ranging from 10 to 200 nanometers in diameter. This approach is developed to address the limitations of conventional biopesticides, such as rapid degradation, low stability under field conditions, and limited efficacy due to environmental exposure. The encapsulation process involves embedding the biopesticide agent within a polymeric, lipid, or other biodegradable shell, which protects the active ingredient from volatilization, photodegradation, and leaching.

Nanoencapsulated biopesticides are designed to achieve controlled release of the active ingredients in response to environmental triggers such as pH, moisture, or temperature. This targeted delivery mechanism has been shown to improve the bioavailability and stability of botanical insecticides and essential oil-based pest control agents. Compared with conventional formulations, nanoencapsulation may reduce the frequency of applications, improve adhesion to plant surfaces, and minimize off-target effects.

Despite its potential, the adoption of nanoencapsulation for biopesticides faces challenges. These include the need for standardized characterization methods, limited understanding of nanomaterial interactions with diverse agricultural environments, and the absence of comprehensive regulatory frameworks for nanoformulated pesticides in many countries.

== Examples ==
Bacillus thuringiensis is a bacterium capable of causing disease of Lepidoptera, Coleoptera and Diptera. The toxin from B. thuringiensis (Bt toxin) has been incorporated directly into plants via genetic engineering. Bt toxin manufacturers claim it has little effect on other organisms, and is more environmentally friendly than synthetic pesticides.

Other microbial control agents include products based on:

- entomopathogenic fungi (e.g. Beauveria bassiana, Isaria fumosorosea, Lecanicillium, Metarhizium, and Steinernema carpocapsae spp.)
- plant disease control agents: include Trichoderma spp. and Ampelomyces quisqualis (a hyperparasite of grape powdery mildew); Bacillus subtilis is also used to control plant pathogens.
- beneficial nematodes attacking insects (e.g. Steinernema feltiae) or slugs (e.g. Phasmarhabditis hermaphrodita)
- entomopathogenic viruses (e.g.. Cydia pomonella granulovirus).
- weeds and rodents have been controlled with microbial agents.

Various animal, fungal, and plant organisms and extracts have been used as biopesticides. Products in this category include:

- Insect pheromones and other semiochemicals
- Fermentation products such as Spinosad (a macrocyclic lactone)
- Chitosan: a plant in the presence of this product naturally induces systemic resistance (ISR) to allow the plant to defend itself against disease, pathogens and pests.
- Biopesticides may include natural plant-derived products, which include alkaloids, terpenoids, phenolics and other secondary chemicals. Vegetable oils such as canola oil have pesticidal properties.

== Applications ==
Microbial agents, effective control requires appropriate formulation and application.

Biopesticides have established themselves on a variety of crops for use against crop disease. For example, biopesticides help control downy mildew diseases. Their benefits include: a 0-day pre-harvest interval (see: maximum residue limit), success under moderate to severe disease pressure, and the ability to use as a tank mix or in a rotational program with other fungicides. Because some market studies estimate that as much as 20% of global fungicide sales are directed at downy mildew diseases, the integration of biofungicides into grape production has substantial benefits by extending the useful life of other fungicides, especially those in the reduced-risk category.

A major growth area for biopesticides is in the area of seed treatments and soil amendments. Fungicidal and biofungicidal seed treatments are used to control soil-borne fungal pathogens that cause seed rot, damping-off, root rot and seedling blights. They can also be used to control internal seed-borne fungal pathogens as well as fungal pathogens on the seed surface. Many biofungicidal products show capacities to stimulate plant host defense and other physiological processes that can make treated crops more resistant to stresses.

== Disadvantages ==
- High specificity: which may require an exact identification of the pest/pathogen and the use of multiple products used; although this can also be an advantage in that the biopesticide is less likely to harm non-target species
- Slow action speed (thus making them unsuitable if a pest outbreak is an immediate threat)
- Variable efficacy due to the influences of various factors (since some biopesticides are living organisms, which bring about pest/pathogen control by multiplying within or nearby the target pest/pathogen)
- Living organisms evolve and increase their tolerance to control. If the target population is not exterminated or rendered incapable of reproduction, the surviving population can acquire tolerance of whatever pressures are brought to bear, resulting in an evolutionary arms race.
- Unintended consequences: Studies have found broad spectrum biopesticides have lethal and nonlethal risks for non-target native pollinators such as Melipona quadrifasciata in Brazil.

== See also ==
- Antagonism (phytopathology)
- Bioherbicide
- Biological pest control
- Cembratrienol
- Integrated Pest Management
- LUBILOSA
- Pest resistance management plans
- Plant defense against herbivory
- Use as a population control agent
