= Insecticide =

Pesticide used against insects

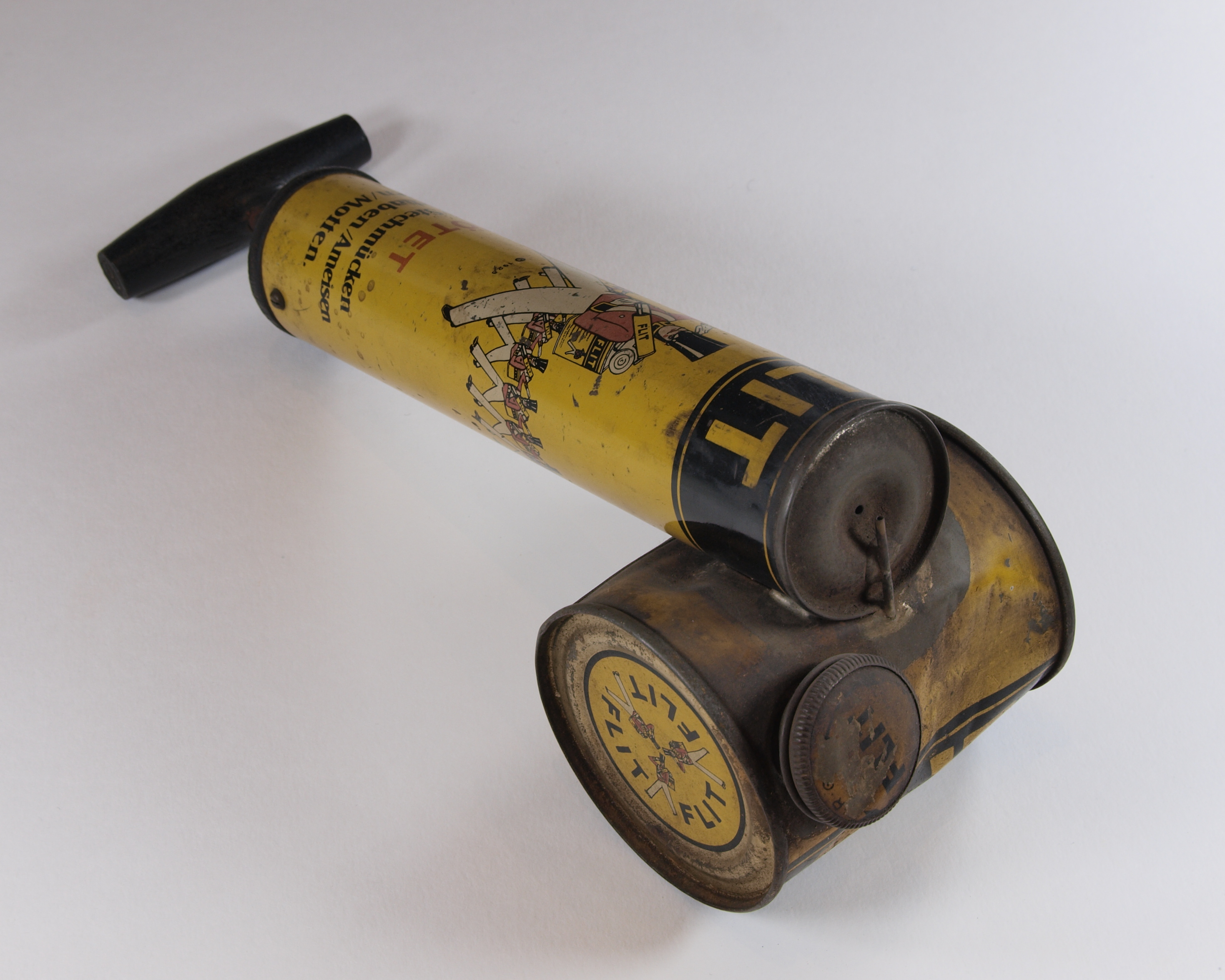
FLIT manual spray pump from 1928

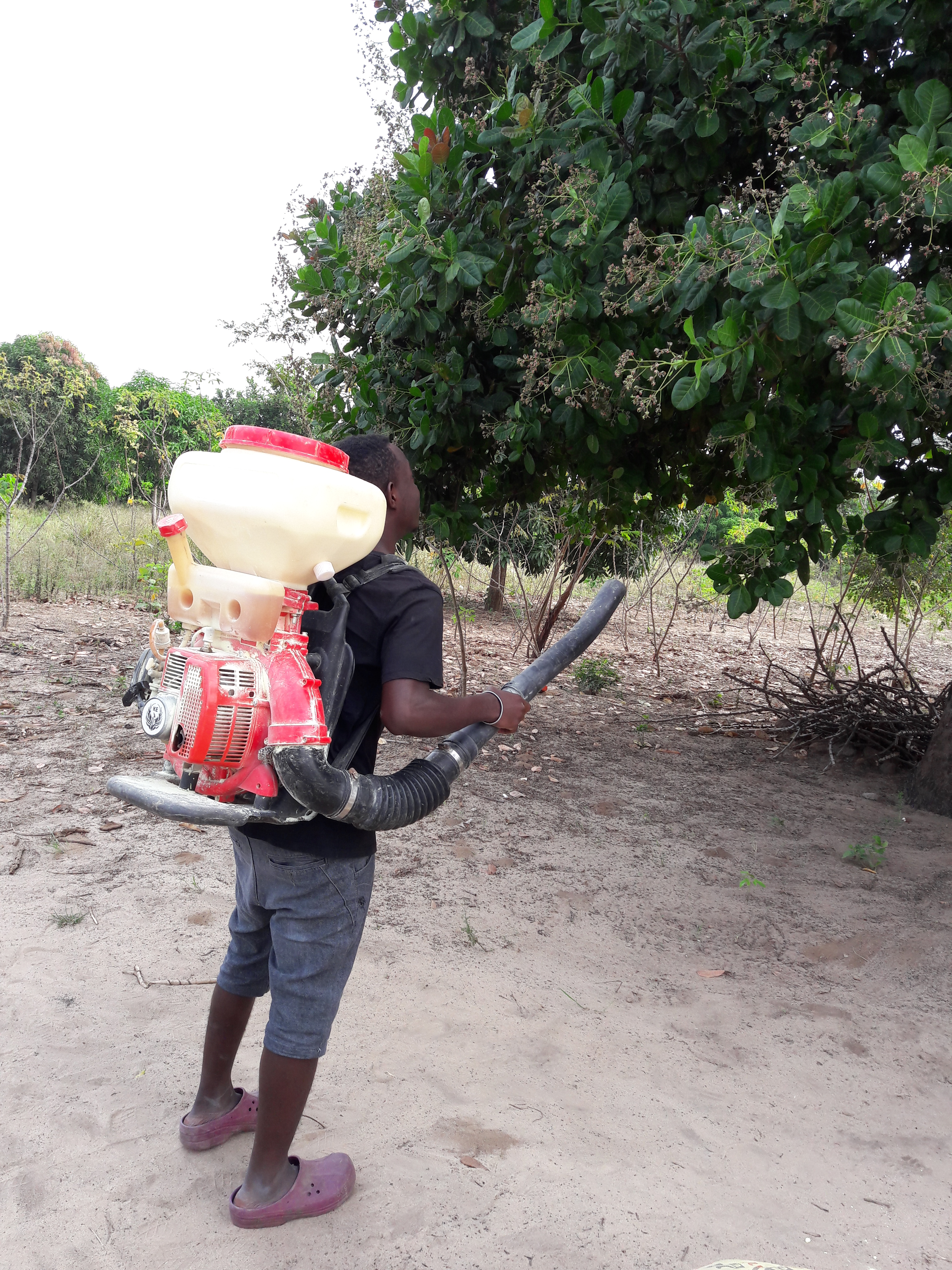
Farmer spraying a cashew tree in Tanzania

Insecticides are pesticides used to kill insects. They include ovicides and larvicides used against insect eggs and larvae, respectively. The major use of insecticides is in agriculture, but they are also used in home and garden settings, industrial buildings, for vector control, and control of insect parasites of animals and humans.

Acaricides, which kill mites and ticks, are not strictly insecticides, but are usually classified together with insecticides. Some insecticides (including common bug sprays) are effective against other non-insect arthropods as well, such as scorpions, spiders, etc. Insecticides are distinct from insect repellents, which repel but do not kill.

== Sales ==
In 2016 insecticides were estimated to account for 18% of worldwide pesticide sales. Worldwide sales of insecticides in 2018 were estimated as $18.4 billion, of which 25% were neonicotinoids, 17% were pyrethroids, 13% were diamides, and the rest were many other classes which sold for less than 10% each of the market.

== Synthetic insecticides ==
Insecticides are most usefully categorised according to their modes of action. The insecticide resistance action committee (IRAC) lists 30 modes of action plus unknowns. There can be several chemical classes of insecticide with the same mode or action. IRAC lists 56 chemical classes plus unknowns.

The mode of action describes how the insecticide kills or inactivates a pest.

=== Development ===
Insecticides with systemic activity against sucking pests, which are safe to pollinators, are sought after, particularly in view of the partial bans on neonicotinoids. Revised 2023 guidance by registration authorities describes the bee testing that is required for new insecticides to be approved for commercial use.

=== Systemicity and translocation ===
Insecticides may be systemic or non-systemic (contact insecticides). Systemic insecticides penetrate into the plant and move (translocate) inside the plant. Translocation may be upward in the xylem, or downward in the phloem or both. Systemicity is a prerequisite for the pesticide to be used as a seed-treatment. Contact insecticides (non-systemic insecticides) remain on the leaf surface and act through direct contact with the insect.

Insects feed from various compartments in the plant. Most of the major pests are either chewing insects or sucking insects. Chewing insects, such as caterpillars, eat whole pieces of leaf. Sucking insects use feeding tubes to feed from phloem (e.g. aphids, leafhoppers, scales and whiteflies), or to suck cell contents (e.g. thrips and mites). An insecticide is more effective if it is in the compartment the insect feeds from. The physicochemical properties of the insecticide determine how it is distributed throughout the plant.

=== Organochlorides ===
The first and best known organochloride, DDT, was first synthesised by Othmar Zeidler. Swiss scientist Paul Müller found DDTs insecticide properties. For this discovery, he was awarded the 1948 Nobel Prize for Physiology or Medicine. DDT was introduced in 1944. It functions by opening sodium channels in the insect's nerve cells. The contemporaneous rise of the chemical industry facilitated large-scale production of chlorinated hydrocarbons including various cyclodiene and hexachlorocyclohexane compounds. Although commonly used in the past, many older chemicals have been removed from the market due to their health and environmental effects (e.g. DDT, chlordane, and toxaphene).

=== Organophosphates ===
Organophosphates are another large class of contact insecticides. These also target the insect's nervous system. Organophosphates interfere with the enzymes acetylcholinesterase and other cholinesterases, causing an increase in synaptic acetylcholine and overstimulation of the parasympathetic nervous system, killing or disabling the insect. Organophosphate insecticides and chemical warfare nerve agents (such as sarin, tabun, soman, and VX) have the same mechanism of action. Organophosphates have a cumulative toxic effect to wildlife, so multiple exposures to the chemicals amplifies the toxicity. In the US, organophosphate use declined with the rise of substitutes. Many of these insecticides, first developed in the mid 20th century, are very poisonous. Many organophosphates do not persist in the environment.

=== Pyrethroids ===
Pyrethroid insecticides mimic the insecticidal activity of the natural compound pyrethrin, the biopesticide found in Pyrethrum (Now Chrysanthemum and Tanacetum) species. They have been modified to increase their stability in the environment. These compounds are nonpersistent sodium channel modulators and are less toxic than organophosphates and carbamates. Compounds in this group are often applied against household pests. Some synthetic pyrethroids are toxic to the nervous system.

=== Neonicotinoids ===
Neonicotinoids are a class of neuro-active insecticides chemically similar to nicotine, with much lower acute mammalian toxicity and greater field persistence. These chemicals are acetylcholine receptor agonists. They are broad-spectrum systemic insecticides, with rapid action (measured in minutes or hours). They are applied as sprays, drenches, seed and soil treatments. Treated insects exhibit leg tremors, rapid wing motion, stylet withdrawal (aphids), disoriented movement, paralysis and death. Imidacloprid, of the neonicotinoid family, is the most widely used insecticide in the world. In the late 1990s neonicotinoids came under increasing scrutiny over their environmental impact and were linked in a range of studies to adverse ecological effects, including honey-bee colony collapse disorder (CCD) and loss of birds due to a reduction in insect populations. In 2013, the European Union and a few non EU countries restricted the use of certain neonicotinoids. and its potential to increase the susceptibility of rice to planthopper attacks.

=== Diamides ===
Diamides selectively activate insect ryanodine receptors (RyR), which are large calcium release channels present in cardiac and skeletal muscle, leading to the loss of calcium crucial for biological processes. This causes insects to act lethargic, stop feeding, and eventually die. The first insecticide from this class to be registered was flubendiamide.

== Biological insecticides ==
=== Definition ===
The EU defines biopesticides as "a form of pesticide based on micro-organisms or natural products". The US EPA defines biopesticides as “certain types of pesticides derived from such natural materials as animals, plants, bacteria, and certain minerals”. Microorganisms that control pests may also be categorised as biological pest control agents together with larger organisms such as parasitic insects, entomopathic nematodes etc. Natural products may also be categorised as chemical insecticides.

The US EPA describes three types of biopesticide. Biochemical pesticides (meaning bio-derived chemicals), which are naturally occurring substances that control pests by non-toxic mechanisms. Microbial pesticides consisting of a microorganism (e.g., a bacterium, fungus, virus or protozoan) as the active ingredient. Plant-Incorporated-Protectants (PIPs) are pesticidal substances that plants produce from genetic material that has been added to the plant (thus producing transgenic crops).

=== Market ===
The global bio-insecticide market was estimated to be less than 10% of the total insecticide market. The bio-insecticide market is dominated by microbials. The bio-insecticide market is growing more that 10% yearly, which is a higher growth than the total insecticide market, mainly due to the increase in organic farming and IPM, and also due to benevolent government policies.

Biopesticides are regarded by the US and European authorities as posing fewer risks of environmental and mammalian toxicity. Biopesticides are more than 10 x (often 100 x) cheaper and 3 x faster to register than synthetic pesticides.

=== Advantages and disadvantages ===
There is a wide variety of biological insecticides with differing attributes, but in general the following has been described.

They are easier, faster and cheaper to register, usually with lower mammalian toxicity. They are more specific, and thus preserve beneficial insects and biodiversity in general. This makes them compatible with IPM regimes. They degrade rapidly causing less impact on the environment. They have a shorter withholding period.

The spectrum of control is narrow. They are less effective and prone to adverse ambient conditions. They degrade rapidly and are thus less persistent. They are slower to act. They are more expensive, have a shorter shelf-life, and are more difficult to source. They require more specialised knowledge to use.

=== Plant extracts ===
Most or all plants produce chemical insecticides to stop insects eating them. Extracts and purified chemicals from thousands of plants have been shown to be insecticidal, however only a few are used in agriculture. In the USA 13 are registered for use, in the EU 6. In Korea, where it is easier to register botanical pesticides, 38 are used. Most used are neem oil, chenopodium, pyrethrins, and azadirachtin. Many botanical insecticides used in past decades (e.g. rotenone, nicotine, ryanodine) have been banned because of their toxicity.

=== Genetically modified crops ===
The first transgenic crop, which incorporated an insecticidal PIP, contained a gene for the CRY toxin from Bacillus thuringiensis (B.t.) and was introduced in 1997. For the next ca 25 years the only insecticidal agents used in GMOs were the CRY and VIP toxins from various strains of B.t, which control a wide number of insect types. These are widely used with > 100 million hectares planted with B.t. modified crops in 2019. Since 2020 several novel agents have been engineered into plants and approved. ipd072Aa from Pseudomonas chlororaphis, ipd079Ea from Ophioglossum pendulum, and mpp75Aa1.1 from Brevibacillus laterosporus code for protein toxins. The trait dvsnf7 is an RNAi agent consisting of a double-stranded RNA transcript containing a 240 bp fragment of the WCR Snf7 gene of the western corn rootworm (Diabrotica virgifera virgifera).

=== RNA interference ===
RNA interference (RNAi) uses segments of RNA to fatally silence crucial insect genes. In 2024 two uses of RNAi have been registered by the authorities for use: Genetic modification of a crop to introduce a gene coding for an RNAi fragment and spraying double stranded RNA fragments onto a field. Monsanto introduced the trait DvSnf7 which expresses a double-stranded RNA transcript containing a 240 bp fragment of the WCR Snf7 gene of the Western Corn Rootworm. GreenLight Biosciences introduced Ledprona, a formulation of double stranded RNA as a spray for potato fields. It targets the essential gene for proteasome subunit beta type-5 (PSMB5) in the Colorado potato beetle.

=== Spider toxins ===
Spider venoms contain many, often hundreds, of insecticidally active toxins. Many are proteins that attack the nervous system of the insect. Vestaron introduced for agricultural use a spray formulation of GS-omega/kappa-Hxtx-Hv1a (HXTX), derived from the venom of the Australian blue mountain funnel web spider (Hadronyche versuta). HXTX acts by allosterically modifying the nicotinic acetylcholine receptor (IRAC group 32).

=== Entomopathic bacteria ===
Entomopathic bacteria can be mass-produced. The most widely used is Bacillus thuringiensis (B.t.), used commercially since 1938. There are several strains used with different applications against lepidoptera, coleoptera and diptera. Also used are Lysinibacillus sphaericus, Burkholderia spp, and Wolbachia pipientis. Avermectins and spinosyns are bacterial metabolites, mass-produced by fermentation and used as insecticides. The toxins from B.t. have been incorporated into plants through genetic engineering.

=== Entomopathic fungi ===
Entomopathic fungi have been used since 1965 for agricultural use. Hundreds of strains are now in use. They often kill a broad range of insect species. Most strains are from Beauveria, Metarhizium, Cordyceps and Akanthomyces species.

=== Entomopathic viruses ===
Of the many types of entomopathic viruses, only baculaviruses are used commercially, and are each specific for their target insect. They have to be grown on insects, so their production is labour-intensive.

== Sublethal effects ==
When an insect population is exposed to pesticide concentrations that are sublethal, surviving individuals may experience a variety of sublethal effects (symptoms). These effects can influence its biology, behavior, and long-term population dynamics. Documented sublethal responses include reduced or increased reproductive capacity, shortened or lengthened lifespan, altered developmental timing or deformities, disrupted feeding activity, and changes in foraging or movement patterns. Over time, these physiological and behavioral changes can slow population growth, disrupt ecological interactions, or in some cases, lead to compensatory increases in reproduction as a stress response. Sublethal exposure can lead to pesticide resistance. Insects that survive may carry genetic traits that enable tolerance, and when these individuals reproduce, resistance can spread through the population and result in decreased long-term pesticide effectiveness. Understanding sublethal effects is critical for integrated pest management strategies and for evaluating the ecological risk of pesticide use in agricultural and natural ecosystems.

== Environmental toxicity ==
=== Effects on nontarget species ===
Some insecticides kill or harm other creatures in addition to those they are intended to kill. For example, birds may be poisoned when they eat food that was recently sprayed with insecticides or when they mistake an insecticide granule on the ground for food and eat it. Sprayed insecticide may drift from the area to which it is applied and into wildlife areas, especially when it is sprayed aerially.

=== Persistence in the environment and accumulation in the food chain ===
DDT was the first organic insecticide. It was introduced during WW2, and was widely used. One use was vector control and it was sprayed on open water. It degrades slowly in the environment, and it is lipophilic (fat soluble). It became the first global pollutant, and the first pollutant to accumulate and magnify in the food chain. During the 1950s and 1960s these very undesirable side effects were recognized, and after some often contentious discussion, DDT was banned in many countries in the 1960s and 1970s. Finally in 2001 DDT and all other persistent insecticides were banned via the Stockholm Convention. Since many decades the authorities require new insecticides to degrade in the environment and not to bioaccumulate.

=== Runoff and percolation ===
Solid bait and liquid insecticides, especially if improperly applied in a location, get moved by water flow. Often, this happens through nonpoint sources where runoff carries insecticides in to larger bodies of water. As snow melts and rainfall moves over and through the ground, the water picks applied insecticides and deposits them in to larger bodies of water, rivers, wetlands, underground sources of previously potable water, and percolates in to watersheds. This runoff and percolation of insecticides can effect the quality of water sources, harming the natural ecology and thus, indirectly effect human populations through biomagnification and bioaccumulation.

=== Insect decline ===
Both number of insects and number of insect species have declined dramatically and continuously over past decades, causing much concern. Many causes are proposed to contribute to this decline, the most agreed upon are loss of habitat, intensification of farming practices, and insecticide usage. Domestic bees were declining some years ago but population and number of colonies have now risen both in the USA and worldwide. Wild species of bees are still declining.

=== Bird decline ===
Besides the effects of direct consumption of insecticides, populations of insectivorous birds decline due to the collapse of their prey populations. Spraying of especially wheat and corn in Europe is believed to have caused an 80 per cent decline in flying insects, which in turn has reduced local bird populations by one to two thirds.

== Alternatives ==
Instead of using chemical insecticides to avoid crop damage caused by insects, there are many alternative options available now that can protect farmers from major economic losses. Some of them are:

1. Breeding crops resistant, or at least less susceptible, to pest attacks.
2. Releasing predators, parasitoids, or pathogens to control pest populations as a form of biological control.
3. Chemical control like releasing pheromones into the field to confuse the insects into not being able to find mates and reproduce.
4. Integrated Pest Management: using multiple techniques in tandem to achieve optimal results.
5. Push-pull technique: intercropping with a "push" crop that repels the pest, and planting a "pull" crop on the boundary that attracts and traps it.

== See also ==
- Fogger
- Index of pesticide articles
- Insecticide Resistance Action Committee
- Integrated pest management
- Pesticide application
- Sterile insect technique
