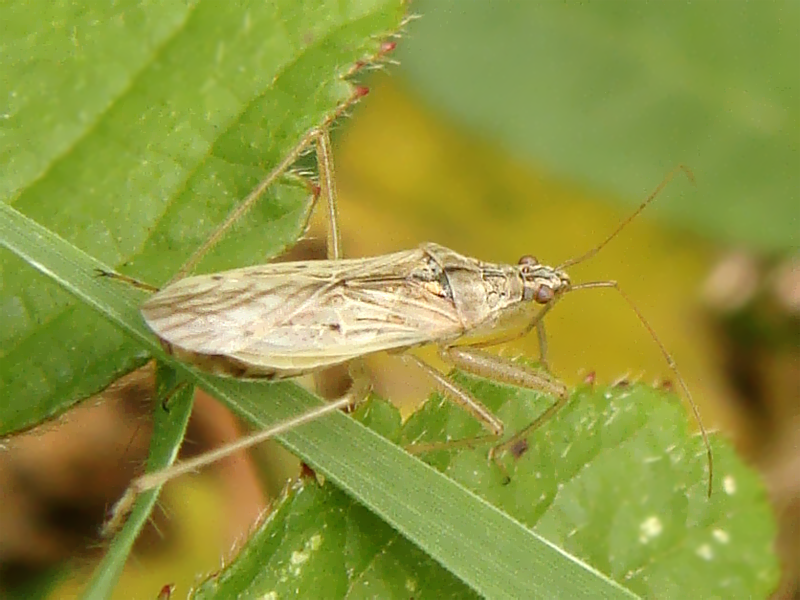
- Nabis pseudoferus ibericus in Portugal

Scientific classification
- Kingdom: Animalia
- Phylum: Arthropoda
- Class: Insecta
- Order: Hemiptera
- Suborder: Heteroptera
- Family: Nabidae
- Genus: Nabis
- Species: N. pseudoferus

Binomial name
- Nabis pseudoferus Remane, 1949

= Nabis pseudoferus =

Species of true bug

Nabis pseudoferus is a species of damsel bug in the family Nabidae.

This insect shows promise as an agent of biological pest control against the South American tomato pinkworm (Tuta absoluta).
