= Tuta (moth) =

- Tomato leafminer (Tuta absoluta)

Scientific classification
- Kingdom: Animalia
- Phylum: Arthropoda
- Clade: Pancrustacea
- Class: Insecta
- Order: Lepidoptera
- Family: Gelechiidae
- Subfamily: Gelechiinae
- Genus: Tuta; Kieffer & Jörgensen, 1910

Species
- see text.

Genus of moths

Tuta is a genus of moth in the family Gelechiidae.

The best-known species is probably the notorious pest of tomato crops Tuta absoluta.

== Species ==
- Tuta absoluta (Meyrick, 1917)
- Tuta atriplicella (Kieffer & Jörgensen, 1910)
