= Pest resistance management plans =

To protect the continued use of biopesticides, the United States Environmental Protection Agency is requiring companies developing transgenic crops to submit and implement pest resistance management plans as a requirement of product registration.

If they are exposed to a toxin excessively, most insect populations can develop resistance, making pest control products less effective. With new biopesticide technologies comes the concern that pests will rapidly develop resistance to natural insecticides, because plant pesticides tend to produce the pesticidal active ingredient throughout a growing season, increasing the selection pressure upon both the target pests and any other susceptible insects feeding on the transformed crop. A resistance management plan is intended to sustain the useful life of transgenic technology and well as the utility of the toxin for organic farmers. This is part of the reason the EPA enacts “risk assessments that evaluate the potential for harm to humans, wildlife, fish, and plants, including endangered species and non-target organisms. Contamination of surface water or ground water from leaching, runoff, and spray drift” on farms across the country.

== See also ==
- Bioengineering
- Pesticide resistance
