= Tuta atriplicella =

Scientific classification
- Domain: Eukaryota
- Kingdom: Animalia
- Phylum: Arthropoda
- Class: Insecta
- Order: Lepidoptera
- Family: Gelechiidae
- Genus: Tuta
- Species: T. atriplicella

Binomial name
- Tuta atriplicella (Kieffer & Jörgensen, 1910)

Synonyms
- Gnorimoschema (Tuta) atriplicella Kieffer & Jörgensen, 1910; Gnorimoschema (Tuta) atriplicella Strand, 1911

Species of moth

Tuta atriplicella is a moth in the family Gelechiidae. It was described by Kieffer and Jörgensen in 1910. It is found in Argentina.

The length of the forewings is 7–8 mm. The forewings are dull grey-whitish, weakly shining yellowish and sprinkled with olive-greyish and blackish in the terminal area. The hindwings are a little darker, but more shining yellowish.
