= Cembratrienol =

Names
- Preferred IUPAC name (2E,4S,7E,11E)-1,7,11-Trimethyl-4-(propan-2-yl)cyclotetradeca-2,7,11-trien-1-ol

Identifiers
3D model (JSmol)	Interactive image
PubChem CID	122706255
- InChI: InChI=1S/C20H34O/c1-16(2)19-12-11-18(4)9-6-8-17(3)10-7-14-20(5,21)15-13-19/h9-10,13,15-16,19,21H,6-8,11-12,14H2,1-5H3/b15-13+,17-10+,18-9+/t19-,20?/m1/s1 Key: YAPXSYXFLHDPCK-TWZJLWADSA-N
- SMILES: C/C/1=C\CCC(/C=C/[C@@H](CC/C(=C/CC1)/C)C(C)C)(C)O

Properties
Chemical formula	C_{20}H_{34}O
Molar mass	290.491 g·mol^{−1}
- Except where otherwise noted, data are given for materials in their standard state (at 25 °C [77 °F], 100 kPa). Infobox references

Cembratrienol (CBTol) is a tertiary alcohol produced in the leaves of tobacco plants. It acts as an insect repellent.

== History ==
In 2018 researchers isolated the sections of the tobacco genome that produce CBTol molecules. They incorporated those genes into Escherichia coli bacteria. When fed wheat bran, those bacteria produced CBTol. The chemical was extracted via centrifugal separation chromatography and incorporated into a biodegradable, non-toxic and environmentally-friendly repellent that can be sprayed directly onto crops. In laboratory tests, aphids avoided treated crops. One side benefit was that it kills multiple types of gram-positive bacteria that are harmful to humans.

== See also ==
- Crop protection
- Insecticide
- Pesticide
