= Diamide insecticides =

Class of insecticide

Flubendiamide, a phthalic diamide insecticide

Chlorantraniliprole, an anthranilic diamide insecticide

Cyantraniliprole, another anthranilic diamide insecticide

Diamide insecticides are a class of insecticides, active mainly against lepidoptera (caterpillars), which act on the insect ryanodine receptor. They are diamides of either phthalic acid or anthranilic acid, with various appropriate further substitutions.

Worldwide sales of diamides in 2018 were estimated at US$2.4 billion, which is 13% of the $18.4 billion insecticide market.

== History and examples ==
The first diamide was flubendiamide. It was invented by Nihon Nohyaku and commercialised in 2007. It is a highly substituted diamide of phthalic acid and is highly active against lepidoptera (caterpillers). Later DuPont introduced chlorantraniliprole, which is more active against caterpillers and in addition active against other insect types. Cyanthraniliprole, introduced later, shows systemic activity and is also active against sucking pests such as aphids and whitefly.

According to one review, the first species reported to show resistance to diamides was the diamondback moth in 2012.

The following diamides have been given ISO common names. Flubendiamide and cyhalodiamide are phthalic (Note: This can be determined by examination of the chemical structure) diamides. Chlorantraniliprole, cyantraniliprole, cyclaniliprole, fluchlordiniliprole, pioxaniliprole, tetrachlorantraniliprole, tetraniliprole, and tiorantraniliprole are anthranilic (Note: This can be determined by examination of the chemical structure) diamides. Eight diamide insecticides have been commercialized as of February 2023.

== Mechanism of action ==
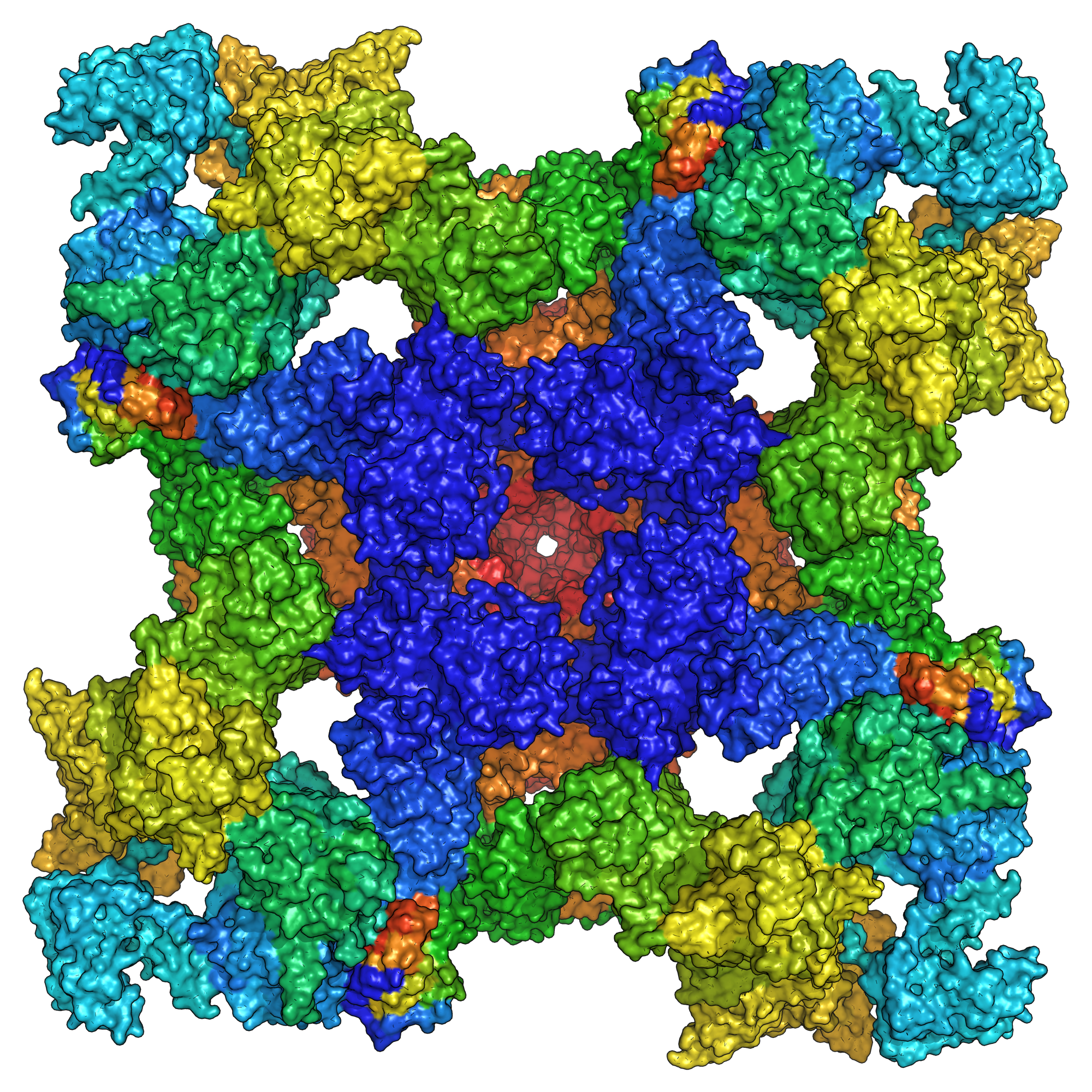
Ryanodine receptor in the open position; the calcium channel is at the center.

Diamides selectively activate insect ryanodine receptors (RyR), which are large tetrameric ryanodine-sensitive calcium release channels present in the sarcoplasmic reticulum and endoplasmic reticulum in neuromuscular tissues. The ryanodine receptor is also the target of the alkaloid insecticide ryanodine, after which it is named, although it addresses a different binding site on the receptor. A 3.2-Å structure of cyanthraniliprole bound to a ryanodine receptor has been determined, which informs on the mechanism of action as well as various mutations causing resistance.

The binding of diamides or ryanodine to the calcium channels causes them to remain open, leading to the loss of calcium crucial for biological processes. Specifically, calcium release is essential for muscle contraction and therefore locomotion. Ryanodine receptors are the only major calcium release channels of the sarco/endoplasmic reticulum. The forcing open of these channels then causes insects to act lethargic, stop feeding, and eventually die.

The diamides are classified under IRAC group 28.

== Toxicity ==
Diamides show low acute mammalian toxicity and appear to safe for bees.

A metabolite of flubendiamide is very persistent and toxic to aquatic invertebrates, causing flubendiamide to be banned by the United States EPA.
