= Ryanodine =

Names
- Preferred IUPAC name (1S,2R,2aS,2a^{1}R,3S,3aS,6S,7R,7aR,9S,9aS)-1,2a,2a^{1},3a,7,9-Hexahydroxy-3,6,9a-trimethyl-1-(propan-2-yl)dodecahydro-3,9-methanobenzo[1,2]pentaleno[1,6-bc]furan-2-yl 1H-pyrrole-2-carboxylate

Identifiers
CAS Number	15662-33-6
3D model (JSmol)	Interactive image
ChEBI	CHEBI:8925
ChEMBL	ChEMBL612231
ChemSpider	16736002
IUPHAR/BPS	4303
KEGG	C08705
MeSH	Ryanodine
PubChem CID	5114
UNII	37H6ATE4SA
CompTox Dashboard (EPA)	DTXSID0032574
- InChI: InChI=1S/C25H35NO9/c1-12(2)22(31)17(34-16(28)14-7-6-10-26-14)23(32)18(4)11-21(30)19(22,5)25(23,33)24(35-21)15(27)13(3)8-9-20(18,24)29/h6-7,10,12-13,15,17,26-27,29-33H,8-9,11H2,1-5H3/t13-,15+,17+,18-,19+,20-,21-,22+,23+,24+,25+/m0/s1 Key: JJSYXNQGLHBRRK-SFEDZAPPSA-N; InChI=1/C25H35NO9/c1-12(2)22(31)17(34-16(28)14-7-6-10-26-14)23(32)18(4)11-21(30)19(22,5)25(23,33)24(35-21)15(27)13(3)8-9-20(18,24)29/h6-7,10,12-13,15,17,26-27,29-33H,8-9,11H2,1-5H3/t13-,15+,17+,18-,19+,20-,21-,22+,23+,24+,25+/m0/s1 Key: JJSYXNQGLHBRRK-SFEDZAPPBA
- SMILES: C[C@H]1CC[C@@]2([C@@]3(C[C@]4([C@@]5([C@]([C@H]([C@@]3([C@]5([C@]2([C@@H]1O)O4)O)O)OC(=O)c6ccc[nH]6)(C(C)C)O)C)O)C)O

Properties
Chemical formula	C_{25}H_{35}NO_{9}
Molar mass	493.553 g·mol^{−1}
- Except where otherwise noted, data are given for materials in their standard state (at 25 °C [77 °F], 100 kPa). verify (what is ?) Infobox references

Ryanodine is a poisonous diterpenoid found in the South American plant Ryania speciosa (Salicaceae). It was isolated by Merck chemists in the 1940s from an extract of the plant by following its insecticidal activity. It was sold since the 1940s in a partially purified form as an insecticide, and used in organic farming, but was removed from the market in 1997.

The compound has extremely high affinity to the open-form ryanodine receptor, a group of calcium channels found in skeletal muscle, smooth muscle, and heart muscle cells. It binds with such high affinity to the receptor that it was used as a label for the first purification of that class of ion channels and gave its name to it.

At nanomolar concentrations, ryanodine locks the receptor in a half-open state, whereas it fully closes them at micromolar concentration. The effect of the nanomolar-level binding is that ryanodine causes release of calcium from calcium stores as the sarcoplasmic reticulum in the cytoplasm, leading to massive muscle contractions. The effect of micromolar-level binding is paralysis. This is true for both mammals and insects.

== See also ==
- Diamide insecticides, a class of insecticides with the same mechanism of action as ryanodine
- Ryanodine receptor
- Dihydropyridine channel
