= Gene silencing pesticide =

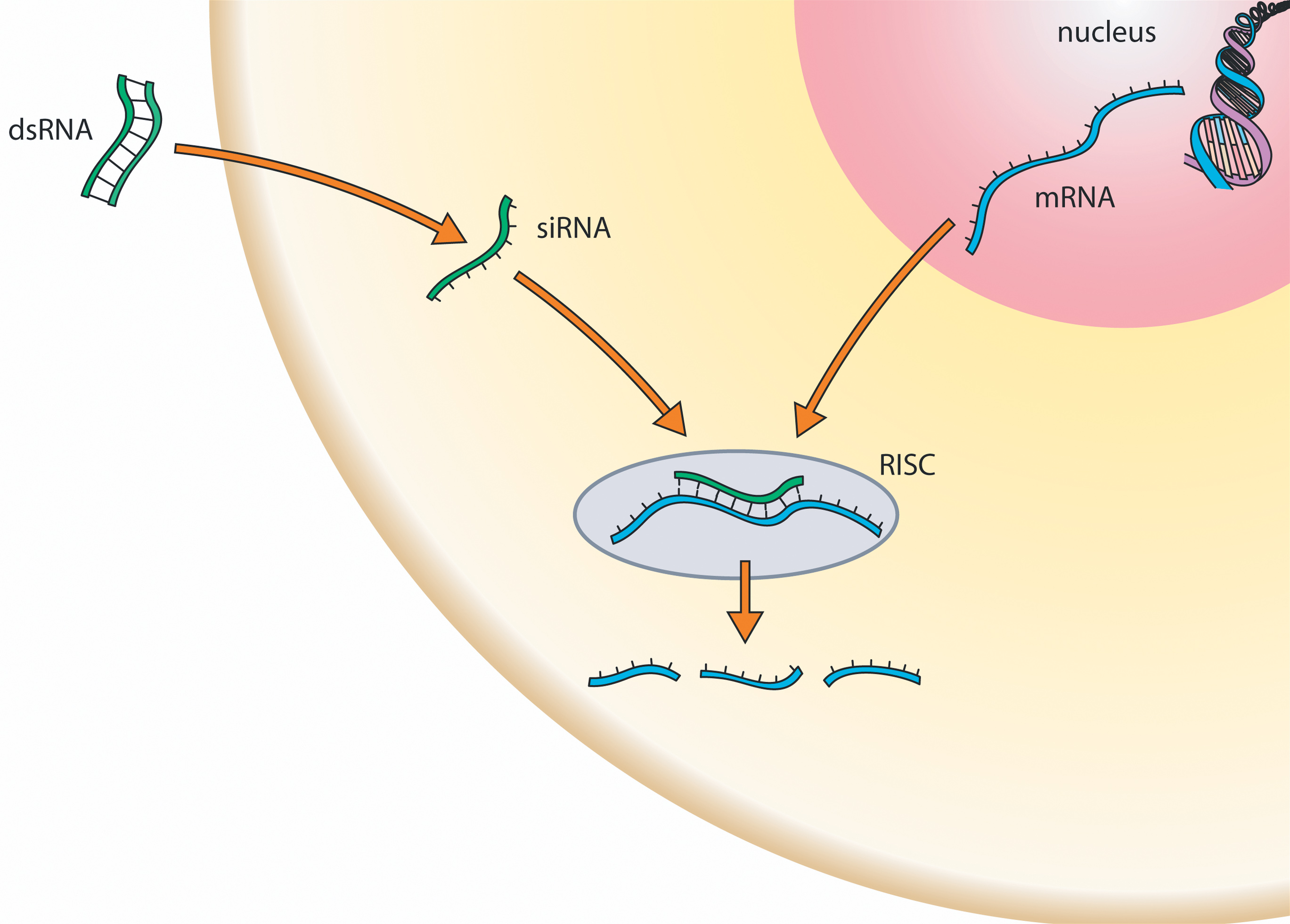
RNAi

Gene silencing pesticides are pesticides that use gene silencing, and RNA interference (RNAi) in particular to target individual species while leaving other species unharmed.

== History ==
In 1998, it was found that double-stranded RNA, injected to worms influenced the natural gene sequence in such a way that it was silenced. Equally surprising was that the genes were also silenced when the worms ingested the dsRNA. Steven Whyard, working for CSIRO Entomology at that time, then also tried it with insects. To his surprise, this also worked, and they just invented something that had huge implications. They then patented the technology and by 2006, it was used in pesticides. Two articles were then also published that confirmed that the effect was powerful enough to protect plants from pests.

== Products ==
Monsanto introduced the trait DvSnf7 which expresses a double-stranded RNA transcript containing a 240 bp fragment of the WCR Snf7 gene of the Western Corn Rootworm. GreenLight Biosciences introduced Ledprona, a formulation of double stranded RNA as a spray for potato fields. It targets the essential gene for proteasome subunit beta type-5 (PSMB5) in the Colorado potato beetle.

== Research ==
Besides directly killing the pests by poisoning the food of insects with RNAi, there are also other ways on how gene silencing pesticides can kill a pest. For example, a research study by Michael Scharf found that it was possible to eradicate termites by using RNAi which disables the Hex-2-gene; this transforms worker termites into soldier termites. A colony with too many soldier termites (apparently more than about 10%) does not have enough remaining worker termites to adequately feed the colony.

A team, led by Xiao-Ya Chen fed gossypol with dsRNA targeting the gene for cytochrome P450 to bollworm larvae to kill them off.

RNA interference (RNAi) is under study for use in spray-on insecticides (RNAi insecticides) by companies including Syngenta and Bayer. Such sprays do not modify the genome of the target plant. The RNA can be modified to maintain its effectiveness as target species evolve to tolerate the original. RNA is a relatively fragile molecule that generally degrades within days or weeks of application. Monsanto estimated costs to be on the order of $5/acre.

RNAi has been used to target weeds that tolerate Roundup. RNAi can be mixed with a silicone surfactant that lets the RNA molecules enter air-exchange holes in the plant's surface. This disrupted the gene for tolerance long enough to let the herbicide work. This strategy would allow the continued use of glyphosate-based herbicides.

They can be made with enough precision to target specific insect species. Monsanto is developing an RNA spray to kill Colorado potato beetles. One challenge is to make it stay on the plant for a week, even if it's raining. The potato beetle has become resistant to more than 60 conventional insecticides.

Monsanto lobbied the U.S. EPA to exempt RNAi pesticide products from any specific regulations (beyond those that apply to all pesticides) and be exempted from rodent toxicity, allergenicity and residual environmental testing. In 2014 an EPA advisory group found little evidence of a risk to people from eating RNA.

However, in 2012, the Australian Safe Food Foundation claimed that the RNA trigger designed to change the starch content of wheat might interfere with the gene for a human liver enzyme. Supporters countered that RNA does not appear to survive human saliva or stomach acids. The US National Honey Bee Advisory Board told EPA that using RNAi would put natural systems at "the epitome of risk". The beekeepers cautioned that pollinators could be hurt by unintended effects and that the genomes of many insects are still undetermined. Other unassessed risks include ecological (given the need for sustained presence for herbicides) and possible RNA drift across species boundaries.

Monsanto invested in multiple companies for their RNA expertise, including Beeologics (for RNA that kills a parasitic mite that infests hives and for manufacturing technology) and Preceres (nanoparticle lipidoid coatings) and licensed technology from Alnylam and Tekmira. In 2012 Syngenta acquired Devgen, a European RNA partner. Startup Forest Innovations is investigating RNAi as a solution to citrus greening disease that in 2014 caused 22 percent of oranges in Florida to fall off the trees.
