= Sulfoxidation =

Type of chemical reactions involving sulfur oxides

In chemistry, sulfoxidation refers to two distinct reactions:

- the radical oxidation of alkanes with sulfur dioxide and oxygen; see sulfonic acid § sulfoxidation
- the oxygenation of a thioether to a sulfoxide or sulfone; see sulfoxide § sulfoxidation
