= Flubendiamide =

Chemical compound used as insecticide

Names
- Preferred IUPAC name N^{1}-[4-(1,1,1,2,3,3,3-Heptafluoropropan-2-yl)-2-methylphenyl]-3-iodo-N^{2}-[1-(methanesulfonyl)-2-methylpropan-2-yl]benzene-1,2-dicarboxamide

Identifiers
CAS Number	272451-65-7
3D model (JSmol)	Interactive image
ChEBI	CHEBI:38798
ChEMBL	ChEMBL563789
ChemSpider	9368325
ECHA InfoCard	100.130.778
EC Number	608-064-7
KEGG	C18520
PubChem CID	11193251
UNII	GEV84ZI4K6
CompTox Dashboard (EPA)	DTXSID4047672
- InChI: InChI=1S/C23H22F7IN2O4S/c1-12-10-13(21(24,22(25,26)27)23(28,29)30)8-9-16(12)32-18(34)14-6-5-7-15(31)17(14)19(35)33-20(2,3)11-38(4,36)37/h5-10H,11H2,1-4H3,(H,32,34)(H,33,35) Key: ZGNITFSDLCMLGI-UHFFFAOYSA-N
- SMILES: CC1=C(C=CC(=C1)C(C(F)(F)F)(C(F)(F)F)F)NC(=O)C2=C(C(=CC=C2)I)C(=O)NC(C)(C)CS(=O)(=O)C

Properties
Chemical formula	C_{23}H_{22}F_{7}IN_{2}O_{4}S
Molar mass	682.39 g·mol^{−1}
Appearance	White crystalline powder
Density	1.659 g·cm^{−3}
Melting point	217.5–220.7 °C (423.5–429.3 °F; 490.6–493.8 K)
Solubility in water	0.0003 g·L^{−1}
Solubility in acetone	102 g·L^{−1}

Hazards
- GHS labelling
Pictograms	(GHS09: Environmental hazard)
Signal word	Warning
Hazard statements	H400
Precautionary statements	P273, P391, P501
- Except where otherwise noted, data are given for materials in their standard state (at 25 °C [77 °F], 100 kPa). Infobox references

Flubendiamide is the first insecticide of the diamide class. It acts on the ryanodine receptor.

== Legality ==
A environmentally persistent metabolite of flubendiamide is quite toxic to aquatic invertebrates, causing flubendiamide to be banned by the United States EPA. The product is still available in other jurisdictions such as Europe and India.
