= Cyantraniliprole =

Chemical compound used as an insecticide

Names
- Preferred IUPAC name 4-Bromo-1-(3-chloropyridin-2-yl)-N-[4-cyano-2-methyl-6-(N-methylcarbamoyl)phenyl]-1H-pyrazole-5-carboxamide
- Other names Cyazypyr; Exirel

Identifiers
| CAS Number | 736994-63-1 |
| 3D model (JSmol) | Interactive image |
| ChEBI | CHEBI:132300 |
| ChemSpider | 9753377 |
| ECHA InfoCard | 100.205.162 |
| PubChem CID | 11578610 |
| UNII | LO6K6H48FD |
| CompTox Dashboard (EPA) | DTXSID2058174 |
- InChI: InChI=1S/C19H14BrClN6O2/c1-10-6-11(9-22)7-12(18(28)23-2)16(10)25-19(29)14-8-15(20)26-27(14)17-13(21)4-3-5-24-17/h3-8H,1-2H3,(H,23,28)(H,25,29) Key: DVBUIBGJRQBEDP-UHFFFAOYSA-N; InChI=1/C19H14BrClN6O2/c1-10-6-11(9-22)7-12(18(28)23-2)16(10)25-19(29)14-8-15(20)26-27(14)17-13(21)4-3-5-24-17/h3-8H,1-2H3,(H,23,28)(H,25,29) Key: DVBUIBGJRQBEDP-UHFFFAOYAE
- SMILES: CC1=CC(=CC(=C1NC(=O)C2=CC(=NN2C3=C(C=CC=N3)Cl)Br)C(=O)NC)C#N

Properties
| Chemical formula | C_{19}H_{14}BrClN_{6}O_{2} |
| Molar mass | 473.72 g·mol^{−1} |
| Melting point | 217-219 °C |
- Except where otherwise noted, data are given for materials in their standard state (at 25 °C [77 °F], 100 kPa). Infobox references

Cyantraniliprole is an insecticide of the diamide class (IRAC MoA group 28). It shows strong activity on lepidoptera (caterpillars), and since it shows systemic activity, it is also active against sucking pests such as aphids and whitefly.

As part of an ongoing court dispute by the Center for Biological Diversity, in November 2022, the U.S. Court of Appeals for the D.C. Circuit ordered the United States Environmental Protection Agency to consider harms to plants and animals under the Endangered Species Act, and to put in place appropriate protections. The draft report by the EPA showed that cyantraniliprole is likely to adversely affect about 41% of endangered or threatened species.
