= SmartStax =

Seeds protected against bugs, weeds

Smartstax
- Genuity Smartstax logo

Development Status
- Developer: Monsanto and Dow AgroSciences
- Currently Available in: Corn
- Coming Soon In: Cotton, Soybean, and specialty crops
- Introduced to Market: 2009
- Website: http://www.genuity.com/Traits/Corn/Genuity-SmartStax.aspx

Technologies
- Herbicide Tolerance: Roundup Ready 2 and Liberty Link
- Insect Protection: VT Triple Pro and Herculex Xtra
- Seed Treatment: Acceleron

SmartStax is a brand of genetically modified seed made through a collaboration between Monsanto Company and Dow Chemical Company. It takes advantage of multiple modes of insect protection and herbicide tolerance. SmartStax takes advantage of Yieldgard VT Triple (Monsanto), Herculex Xtra (Dow), RoundUp Ready 2 (Monsanto), and Liberty Link (Dow). The traits included protect against above-ground insects, below-ground insects, and provide broad herbicide tolerance. It is currently available for corn, but cotton, soybean, and specialty crop variations are to be released. Previously, the most genes artificially added to a single plant was three, but Smartstax includes eight. Smartstax also incorporates Monsanto's Acceleron Seed Treatment System which protects against insects at the earliest stages of development. Smartstax is sold under the Genuity (Monsanto) and Mycogen (Dow) brands.

== Insect Spectrum ==
SmartStax seeds control a broad spectrum of pests which includes larvae of above-ground insects such as European corn borer, black cutworm, southwestern corn borer, corn earworm, fall armyworm, western bean cutworm, and below-ground feeding larvae of western corn rootworm and northern corn rootworm.

== Refuge acres ==
To prevent or delay insect resistance, growers plant a refuge on their farm. This is an area of non-GM plants where insect can live. These insect will not evolve resistance to GM technology. These refuge acres ensure that rare resistant insects that feed on insect-protected varieties of corn will mate with susceptible insects and slow the development of resistance.

== Promotion and branding ==
Smartstax corn has been advertised and promoted on television, at farm trade shows, and online as Monsanto has geared up for widespread commercial release. Smartstax is sold under the Genuity Brand by Monsanto and the Mycogen brand by Dow, but both companies have the right to sell it under as many names with as many additional technologies as they wish.

== Weed and insect resistance ==
Recently, rapid emergence of weeds thought to be resistant to Roundup have been observed. Horseweed, giant ragweed and pigweed, among others have been found growing with crops across the United States. Insects including corn rootworm and bollworm have also begun showing signs of resistance. In response, Monsanto has continued to develop new products. The USDA approves use of Bt crops. Monsanto has denied there is a problem with their product.

== Transgenic events, genes, and traits ==
SmartStax is bred from the products of four transgenic incorporation events MON89034, TC1507, MON88017, DAS59122-7, producing traits phosphinothricin acetyltransferase, CP4 EPSPS, Cry1Fa2, Cry1A.105, Cry2Ab, Cry3Bb1, Cry34Ab1, and Cry35Ab1.
