= Cry6Aa =

Bacterial toxins

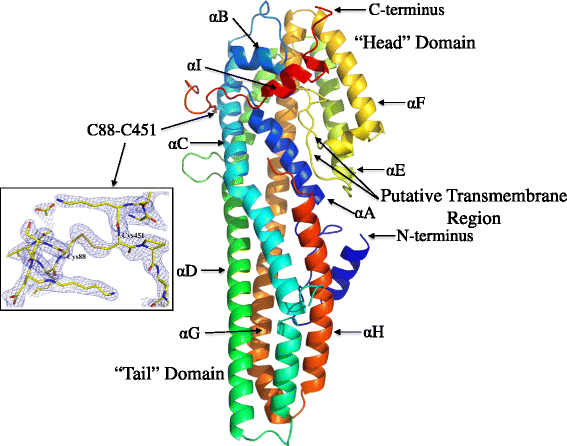
- Protein schematic of Cry6Aa toxin

Identifiers
- Organism: Bacillus thuringiensis
- Symbol: Cry6Aa
- UniProt: Q45757
Search for
- Structures: Swiss-model
- Domains: InterPro

Cry6Aa (Pesticidal crystal protein Cry6Aa) is a toxic crystal protein generated by the bacterial family Bacillus thuringiensis during sporulation. This protein is a member of the alpha pore forming toxins family, which gives it insecticidal qualities advantageous in agricultural pest control. Each Cry protein has some level of target specificity; Cry6Aa has specific toxic action against coleopteran insects and nematodes. The corresponding B. thuringiensis gene, cry6aa, is located on bacterial plasmids. Along with several other Cry protein genes, cry6aa can be genetically recombined in Bt corn and Bt cotton so the plants produce specific toxins. Insects are developing resistance to the most commonly inserted proteins like Cry1Ac. Since Cry6Aa proteins function differently than other Cry proteins, they are combined with other proteins to decrease the development of pest resistance. Recent studies suggest this protein functions better in combination with other virulence factors such as other Cry proteins and metalloproteinases.

== Structure ==
Cry6Aa proteins are unrelated to other insecticidal crystal proteins in primary amino acid structure; it is a member of the Tripartite Haemolysin BL family (TCDB). The protein is rod-shaped, with a diameter of 25 Å and height of 95 Å. It contains 475 residues, not including the N-terminal tail. Most Cry proteins have 3 main domains with functional homology across proteins, domain I contains an alpha helix bundle, domain II is composed of three antiparallel beta sheets in a Greek key motif, and domain III forms a beta sandwich responsible for catalyzing pore formation. However, Cry6Aa, a nine turn protein, consists of bipartite head and tail domains composed mainly of alpha helices. Secondary structure conformation is 71-72% alpha helices and 1-2% beta sheets in most pH conditions. The remaining regions are either bends, turns, or 3/10 helices. The trypsin resistant core is composed of long amphipathic alpha helices and fuels toxic function. The hydrophobic regions of the helices interact with each other, while the hydrophilic portions have increased exposure to the outside environment. Some of the helices are interrupted by loops that have variable positions in the structure. The head domain folds over the helices and contains a beta tongue group, which may trigger pore formation. There is a strong disulfide bond between the C terminal region and a portion of the core that isn't disrupted by trypsin. The protein has structural similarities to other toxins, including haemolysin E and B. cereus toxins HlbB and NheA. No other members of the Cry family utilizing alpha pore toxin structure have been discovered.

== Mechanism of action ==
=== Coleoptera ===
Cry6Aa has pore-forming action that destroys insect intestinal epithelial cells. Most Cry proteins have 3 domains, but Cry6Aa is composed largely of alpha helices, which indicates different membrane insertion methods. Cry6Aa has catalytic head domains regulated by hydrophobic residues. When Cry6Aa is first ingested, it remains a pro-toxin until intestinal proteases cleave the protein into active particles. After activation, the beta tongue head domain binds with the target membranes on brush border membrane cells similar to Haemolysin E. Typical Cry proteins are enhanced by interactions with cadherin, but Cry6Aa receptors remain unknown. Experimental data suggests the proteins embed in the membrane and form oligomeric pores, but the complete mechanism has not been deduced in 2016.

=== Nematodes ===
Presence of Cry6Aa in nematodes triggers a regulated necrosis pathway via an aspartic protease (ASP-1). In order for the toxin to be activated, it must be partially digested inside the organism's intestine after ingestion. ASP-1 proteases are highly concentrated in nematode intestinal cells and protect Cry6Aa proteins from over-degradation during activation. They are also members of the cathepsin family and can digest lysosomes. Cry6Aa triggers a magnesium dependent adenylyl cyclase/protein kinase A signaling pathway, which releases calcium ions into the cell from inositol triphosphate ion channels. Ca^{2+} activates calpain, a cysteine protease, which promotes lysosome rupture. The lysosome is further digested by ASP-1, which leads to cell degradation by cytosolic acidification. Alterations of apoptosis or autophagy proteins do not affect the action of Cry6Aa. Mutations in required proteins for necrosis inhibit Cry6Aa, but not other Cry proteins, revealing a rare mechanism in Cry6Aa. Necrosis isn't promoted in mammalian cells since they express ASP-3 and ASP-4 proteases at higher rates than ASP-1, which is necessary for toxic action by Cry6Aa. The cell receptor for Cry6Aa has not been identified. Additionally, nematocidal activity is enhanced by Bmp1 metalloproteinase, which degrades the intestinal cell wall of the organism. This either speeds death by loss of intestinal function or by increased cell wall perforation easing protein insertion.

== Significance ==
=== Agriculture ===
In order to combat growing pest resistance, Cry6Aa is implemented in transgenic plants because it targets pests differently, increasing susceptibility. DNA shuffling is the process of selecting genes of compatible Cry proteins to transfer into crops. Although the binding site of Cry6Aa is unknown, several sites have been ruled out, allowing successful Cry protein stacking. Because an organism has to be resistant to both expressed Cry proteins to survive, the chances of developing and vertically transferring resistance is lower, granting more time for pesticide research. In 2013, Cry6Aa and Cry3Aa combination transgenic plants were patented to prevent resistance in the western corn rootworm. Additionally, Cry6Aa has been layered with Cry34Ab1/Cry35Ab1, a binary toxin. Pyramiding Cry proteins can enhance the effect of toxins. Cry6Aa and Cry55Aa both can reduce brood size of the root-knot nematode Meloidogyne incognita, but when they are combined, these two proteins are five times more effective. Synergy between Cry proteins comes from either improved toxin docking, membrane insertion, or advanced degradation of the midgut protein matrix which increases action of the slower acting toxin.

=== Necrosis research ===
Cry6Aa can induce necrosis in laboratories without risking cell damage through heat or other triggers. Since necrosis results in swelling and damage to surrounding cell areas, it can be more effective in treating cancers than induced apoptosis. Although Cry6Aa has no action against mammals, many essential cell pathways are conserved throughout eukaryotes. C. elegans is a groundbreaking model nematode affected by Cry6Aa, which can be used to understand the activation of the necrosis pathway. Understanding the role of the aspartic protease may allow scientists to engineer other necrosis-inducing proteins which act through ASP-3 and ASP-4 in order to target mammalian cancer cells.
