= Genetically modified food in Asia =

India and China are the two largest producers of genetically modified products in Asia. India currently only grows GM cotton, while China produces GM varieties of cotton, poplar, petunia, tomato, papaya and sweet pepper. Cost of enforcement of regulations in India are generally higher, possibly due to the greater influence farmers and small seed firms have on policy makers, while the enforcement of regulations was more effective in China. Other Asian countries that grew GM crops in 2011 were Pakistan, the Philippines and Myanmar. GM crops were approved for commercialisation in Bangladesh in 2013 and in Vietnam and Indonesia in 2014.

== China ==
GM crops in China go through three phases of field trials (pilot field testing, environmental release testing, and preproduction testing) before they are submitted to the Office of Agricultural Genetic Engineering Biosafety Administration (OAGEBA) for assessment. Producers must apply to OAGEBA at each stage of the field tests. The Chinese Ministry of Science and Technology developed the first biosafety regulations for GM products in 1993 and they were updated in 2001. The 75 member National Biosafety Committee evaluates all applications, although OAGEBA has the final decision. Most of the National Biosafety Committee are involved in biotechnology leading to criticisms that they do not represent a wide enough range of public concerns.

== India ==
The release of transgenic crops in India is governed by the Indian Environment Protection Act, which was enacted in 1986. The Institutional Biosafety Committee (IBSC), Review Committee on Genetic Manipulation (RCGM) and Genetic Engineering Approval Committee (GEAC) all review any genetically modified organism to be released, with transgenic crops also needing permission from the Ministry of Agriculture. India regulators cleared the Bt brinjal, a genetically modified eggplant, for commercialisation in October 2009. Following opposition from some scientists, farmers and environmental groups a moratorium was imposed on its release in February 2010.

=== Official Reports on GMO ===
There have been four official reports on GMO in India till August 2013 :

1. The ‘Jairam Ramesh Report’ - February 2010, imposing an indefinite moratorium on Bt Brinjal
2. The Sopory Committee Report - August 2012
3. The Parliamentary Standing Committee (PSC) Report on GM crops - August 2012
4. Final Report of The Technical Expert Committee established by Supreme Court - July 2013

== Japan ==
Two laws regulate food safety and food quality in Japan, the Food Sanitation Law passed in 1947 and the Law Concerning Standardization and Proper Labeling of Agricultural and Forestry Products passed in 1950. The Food Sanitation Law has been amended and updated many times; an amendment dealing with pre-market approval and labeling of GMOs was passed in 2000 and came into effect in 2001. Japan passed laws to implement the Cartagena Protocol on Biosafety in September 2003 which came into effect in February 2004 - the Law Concerning the Conservation and Sustainable Use of Biological Diversity through Regulations on the Use of Living Modified Organisms (Law No. 97 of 2003).

Authority for approvals for various uses of genetically modified organisms is divided in Japan. The Ministry of the Environment has final approval for all uses of GMOs, but crops for commercial use and live vaccines for animals first go through the Ministry of Agriculture, Forestry and Fisheries; viruses for gene therapy and other medical applications first go through the Ministry of Health, Labor and Welfare; field trials of GM crops and recombinant DNA used in biotechnology research first goes through the Ministry of Education, Culture, Sports, Science and Technology; and uses in the process of production of industrial enzymes, etc. goes through the Ministry of Economy, Trade and Industry.

Japan has not approved any commodity GM crops to be grown in Japan, but does allow import of agricultural products made from GM crops and food made of imported GM ingredients. Japan does however allow cultivation of GM flowers (e.g. Blue roses).

GM foods must undergo a safety assessment prior to being awarded certification for distribution to the domestic market. The Food Safety Commission (FSC) performs food and feed safety risk assessments.

Certain GM food must be labeled, but this is limited to designated genetically modified agricultural products, which are soybean, corn, potato, rapeseed, cottonseed, alfalfa and beet, and is limited to 32 processed foods which contain soybean, corn and potato, alfalfa and beet, in which recombinant DNA or the resulting protein still exists even after processing. However, processed food in which recombinant DNA or protein is dissolved in or removed during processing, such as soy sauce, soybean oil, corn flakes, millet jelly, corn oil, rapeseed oil, cottonseed oil, and others, do not have to be labeled.

Japan does not require traceability, and allows negative labeling ("GMO-free" and the like).

== Philippines ==
The Philippines bans all GMOs recently overturning existing Department of Agriculture regulations. A petition filed on May 17, 2013 by environmental group Greenpeace Southeast Asia and farmer-scientist coalition Masipag (Magsasaka at Siyentipiko sa Pagpapaunlad ng Agrikultura) asked the appellate court to stop the planting of Bt eggplant in test fields, saying the impacts of such an undertaking to the environment, native crops and human health are still unknown. The Court of Appeals granted the petition, citing the precautionary principle stating "when human activities may lead to threats of serious and irreversible damage to the environment that is scientifically plausible but uncertain, actions shall be taken to avoid or diminish the threat." Respondents filed a motion for reconsideration in June 2013 and on September 20, 2013 the Court of Appeals chose to uphold their May decision saying the bt talong field trials violate the people’s constitutional right to a "balanced and healthful ecology." The Supreme Court on Tuesday, December 8, 2015 permanently stopped the field testing for Bt (Bacillus thuringiensis) talong (eggplant), upholding the decision of the Court of Appeals which stopped the field trials for the genetically modified eggplant. The Philippines Supreme Court also took the unprecedented step and invalidated the Department of Agriculture administrative order allowing the field testing, propagation and commercialization, and importation of GMOs.
