= Earworm (disambiguation) =

An earworm is a piece of music that repeats compulsively within one's mind.

Earworm may also refer to:

- Earworm Records, a British record label
- DJ Earworm, an American mashup artist
- "Earworm" (SpongeBob SquarePants), an episode of SpongeBob SquarePants

== See also ==
- Corn earworm (disambiguation)
- Earwig (disambiguation)
- Star Trek II: The Wrath of Khan, a science fiction film that featured an eel that entered its victims through their ears
