= Mahyco =

Indian agricultural company

Mahyco Private Limited
- Industry: Seeds
- Founded: 1964
- Founder: B.R. Barwale
- Headquarters: Badnapur, Maharashtra, India
- Area served: International
- Website: https://www.mahyco.com/index.html

Maharashtra Hybrid Seeds Co. (Mahyco) is an agricultural company based in India and a major producer of seeds. As of 2015, the company also operates in Vietnam, Indonesia, Philippines and Bangladesh, with plans for expansion into Africa. The company produces seeds for cotton, wheat, rice, sorghum, pearl millet, maize oilseeds and vegetables crops. Through a joint venture with Monsanto named Mahyco Monsanto Biotech, Mahyco sublicenses Bt cotton technology in India. The Indian government has maintained price controls on Bt cotton seeds since at least 2011.

Mahyco has 21 notified research varieties and production of 115 products across 30 crop species. Mahyco has six research centres in India focusing on molecular breeding, applied genomics, crop transformation, plant virus interaction, molecular microbiology, abiotic stress tolerance and molecular entomology.

The company has a research and development center at Dawalwadi near Jalna in Maharashtra, with an ongoing hybrid breeding program in over 30 crop species. Apart from the main R&D centre in Jalna, Mahyco has 3 research centres and 18 other location offices distributed across the country with over 150 scientists engaged in the research programs. As of 2014 Mahyco is present in over 20 countries, with offices in Singapore, Vietnam and recently acquired a controlling stake in Quton, the largest Cotton seeds company in Africa.

== History ==
B. R. Barwale founded the company in 1964.

In 2002, Monsanto and Mahyco's joint venture introduced Bt cotton technology to India. The joint venture's later attempt to introduce Bt brinjal to India was controversial and ultimately unsuccessful.

In 2012, the government of Maharashtra blocked sale of Mahyco Bt Cotton seed in response to distribution and transparency problems. The company's licence to sell was reinstated in May 2013. The first hybrid wheat seed in India "Pratham 7070" was developed by MAHYCO.

== Awards ==
2013: The Association of Biotechnology Led Enterprises (ABLE) recognizes Mahyco for outstanding contribution to the Indian agriculture sector

1990: Awards from the International Seeds and Science Technology (ISST) and the Federation of Indian Chambers of Commerce and Industries (FICCI)
