= Earwig (disambiguation) =

Earwig is the common name for the insect order Dermaptera.

Earwig may also refer to:

- Earwig (band), an indie rock band from Columbus, Ohio
- Earwig (Blake Babies album), 1989
- Earwig (Pegboy album), 1994
- Earwig (film), 2021 film
- Earwig Music Company, an American independent record label founded in 1978
- Mag Earwhig! (Guided by voices album), 1997
- Mrs Earwig, a character in the Discworld novels of Terry Pratchett
- In-Ear Audio Monitor
- "Earwigs", a 2026 episode of Game Changer

== See also ==
- Earworm (disambiguation)
- Earwig and the Witch, 2011 children's novel by Diana Wynne Jones
  - Earwig and the Witch, its 2020 anime film adaptation by Goro Miyazaki
