= Delta endotoxins =

Insecticide

Delta endotoxin, N-terminal domain
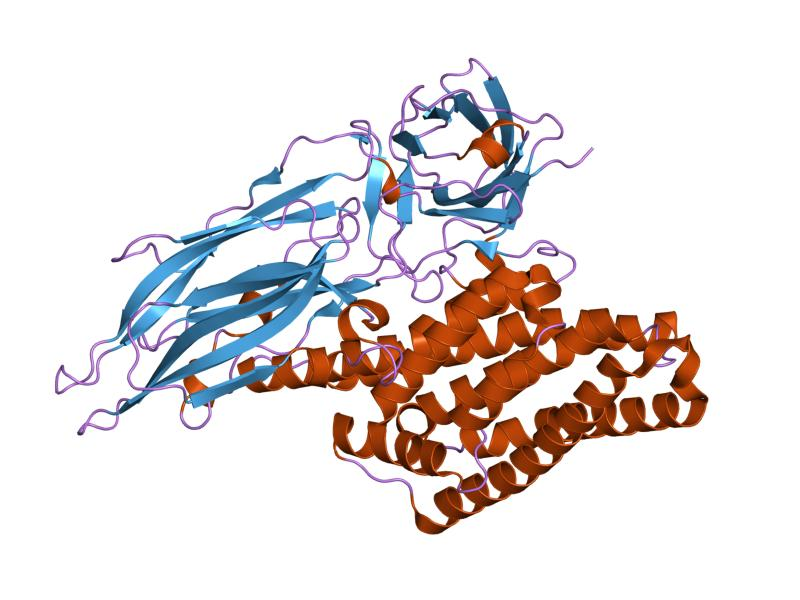
- crystal structure of the insecticidal bacterial del endotoxin Cry3Bb1 Bacillus thuringiensis

Identifiers
- Symbol: Endotoxin_N
- Pfam: PF03945
- InterPro: IPR005639
- SCOP2: 1dlc / SCOPe / SUPFAM
- TCDB: 1.C.2
Available protein structures:
- PDB: IPR005639 PF03945 (ECOD; PDBsum)
- AlphaFold: IPR005639; PF03945

Delta endotoxin, middle domain

Identifiers
- Symbol: Endotoxin_M
- Pfam: PF00555
- Pfam clan: CL0568
- InterPro: IPR015790
- SCOP2: 1dlc / SCOPe / SUPFAM
- TCDB: 1.C.2
Available protein structures:
- PDB: IPR015790 PF00555 (ECOD; PDBsum)
- AlphaFold: IPR015790; PF00555

Delta endotoxin, middle domain, Cry2A and Cry18
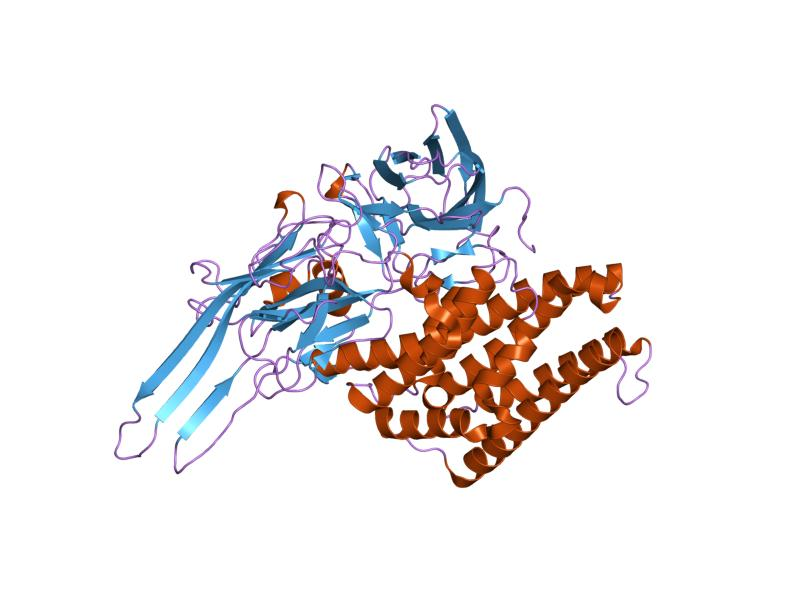
- insecticidal crystal protein cry2aa

Identifiers
- Symbol: Endotoxin_mid
- Pfam: PF09131
- InterPro: IPR015214
- SCOP2: 1i5p / SCOPe / SUPFAM
Available protein structures:
- PDB: IPR015214 PF09131 (ECOD; PDBsum)
- AlphaFold: IPR015214; PF09131

Delta endotoxin, C-terminal

Identifiers
- Symbol: Endotoxin_C
- Pfam: PF03944
- Pfam clan: CL0202
- InterPro: IPR005638
- SCOP2: 1dlc / SCOPe / SUPFAM
- TCDB: 1.C.2
- CDD: cd04085
Available protein structures:
- PDB: IPR005638 PF03944 (ECOD; PDBsum)
- AlphaFold: IPR005638; PF03944

Cytolytic delta-endotoxin Cyt1/2

Identifiers
- Symbol: CytB
- Pfam: PF01338
- InterPro: IPR001615
- SCOP2: 1cby / SCOPe / SUPFAM
- TCDB: 1.C.71
Available protein structures:
- PDB: IPR001615 PF01338 (ECOD; PDBsum)
- AlphaFold: IPR001615; PF01338

Delta endotoxins (δ-endotoxins) are a family of pore-forming toxins produced by Bacillus thuringiensis species of bacteria. They are useful for their insecticidal action and are the primary toxin produced by the genetically modified (GM) Bt maize/corn and other GM crops. During spore formation the bacteria produce crystals of such proteins (hence the name Cry toxins) that are also known as parasporal bodies, next to the endospores; as a result some members are known as a parasporin. The Cyt (cytolytic) toxin group is another group of delta-endotoxins formed in the cytoplasm. VIP toxins (vegetative insecticidal proteins) are formed at other stages of the life cycle.

== Mechanism of action ==
When an insect ingests these proteins, they are activated by proteolytic cleavage. The N-terminus is cleaved in all of the proteins and a C-terminal extension is cleaved in some members. Once activated, the endotoxin binds to the gut epithelium and causes cell lysis by the formation of cation-selective channels, which leads to death.

For many years there was no clarity as to the relationship between aminopeptidase N and Bt toxins. Although AP-N does bind Cry proteins in vitro (reviewed by Soberón et al. 2009 and Pigott & Ellar 2007), no cases of resistance – or even reduced in vitro binding – due to AP-N structure alteration were known through 2002, and there was some doubt that the resistance mechanism was so straight forward. Indeed, Luo et al. 1997, Mohammed et al. 1996, and Zhu et al. 2000 positively found this to not occur in Lepidoptera examples. Subsequently, however Herrero et al. 2005 showed correlation between nonexpression and Bt resistance, and actual resistance was found in Helicoverpa armigera by Zhang et al. 2009, in Ostrinia nubilalis by Khajuria et al. 2011, and in Trichoplusia ni by Baxter et al. 2011 and Tiewsiri & Wang 2011 (also all Lepidoptera). There continues to be confirmation that AP-Ns do not by themselves affect resistance in some cases, possibly due to sequential binding by the toxin being required to produce its effect. In this sequence each binding step is theoretically not indispensable, but if it occurs does contribute to the final pore formation result.

== Structure ==
The activated region of the delta toxin is composed of three distinct structural domains: an N-terminal helical bundle domain (InterPro: IPR005639) involved in membrane insertion and pore formation; a beta-sheet central domain involved in receptor binding; and a C-terminal beta-sandwich domain (InterPro: IPR005638) that interacts with the N-terminal domain to form a channel.

== Types ==
B. thuringiensis encodes many proteins of the delta endotoxin family (InterPro: IPR038979), with some strains encoding multiple types simultaneously. A gene mostly found on plasmids, delta-entotoxins sometimes show up in genomes of other species, albeit at a lower proportion than those found in B. thuringiensis. The gene names look like Cry3Bb, which in this case indicates a Cry toxin of superfamily 3 family B subfamily b.

Cry proteins that are interesting to cancer research are listed under a parasporin (PS) nomenclature in addition to the Cry nomenclature. They do not kill insects, but instead kill leukemia cells. The Cyt toxins tend to form their own group distinct from Cry toxins. Not all Cry — crystal-form — toxins directly share a common root. Examples of non-three-domain toxins that nevertheless have a Cry name include Cry34/35Ab1 and related beta-sandwich binary (Bin-like) toxins, Cry6Aa, and many beta-sandwich parasporins.

Specific delta-endotoxins that have been inserted with genetic engineering include Cry3Bb1 found in MON 863 and Cry1Ab found in MON 810, both of which are maize/corn cultivars. Cry3Bb1 is particularly useful because it kills Coleopteran insects such as the corn rootworm, an activity not seen in other Cry proteins. Other common toxins include Cry2Ab and Cry1F in cotton and maize/corn. In addition, Cry1Ac is effective as a vaccine adjuvant in humans.

Some insect populations have started to develop resistance towards delta endotoxin, with five resistant species found as of 2013. Plants with two kinds of delta endotoxins tend to make resistance happen slower, as the insects have to evolve to overcome both toxins at once. Planting non-Bt plants with the resistant plants will reduce the selection pressure for developing the toxin. Finally, two-toxin plants should not be planted with one-toxin plants, as one-toxin plants act as a stepping stone for adaption in this case.
