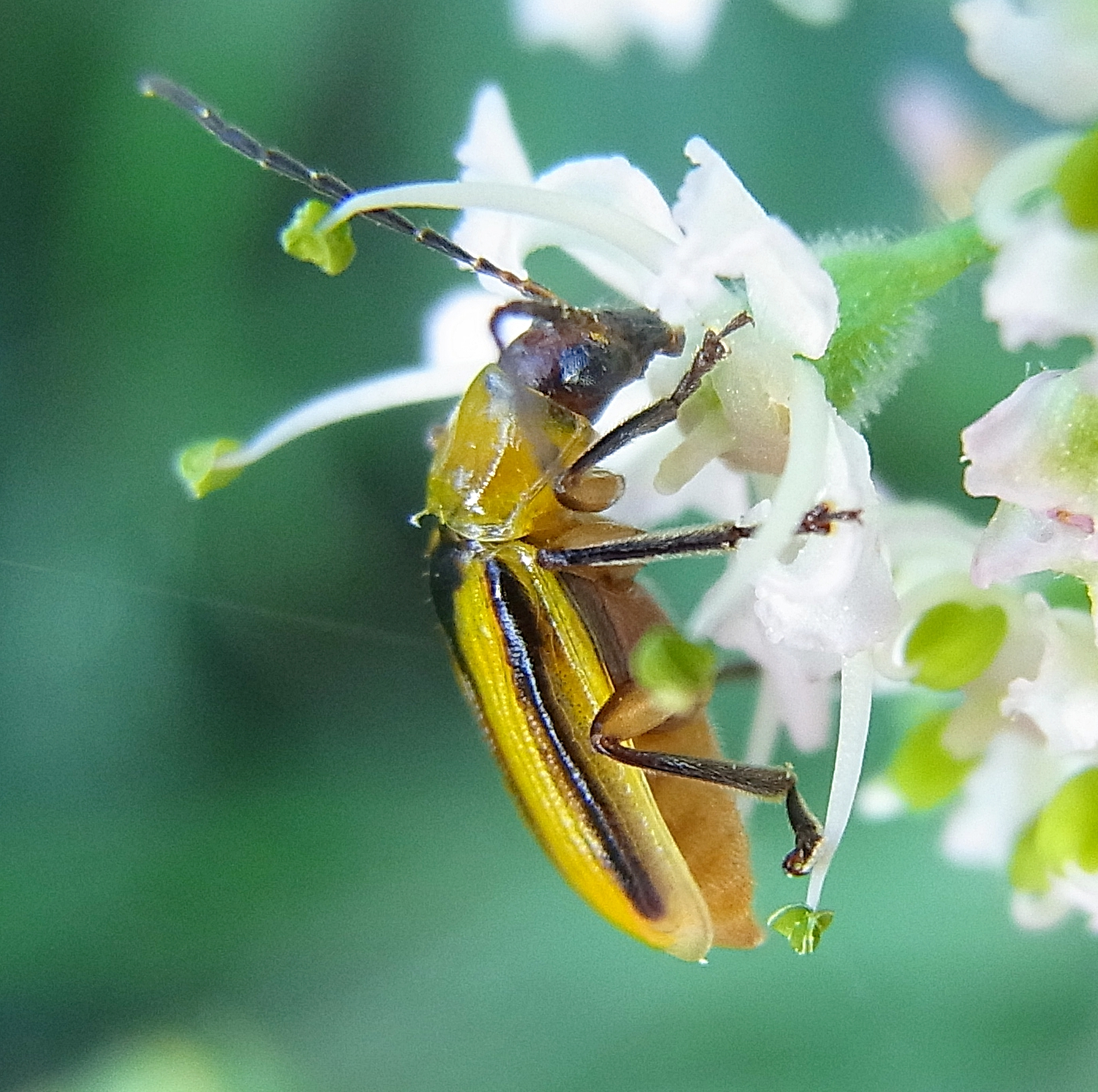

Scientific classification
- Kingdom: Animalia
- Phylum: Arthropoda
- Clade: Pancrustacea
- Class: Insecta
- Order: Coleoptera
- Suborder: Polyphaga
- Infraorder: Cucujiformia
- Family: Chrysomelidae
- Genus: Diabrotica
- Species: D. virgifera
- Subspecies: D. v. virgifera

Trinomial name
- Diabrotica virgifera virgifera LeConte, 1868

= Western corn rootworm =

Subspecies of beetle

The Western corn rootworm, Diabrotica virgifera virgifera, is one of the most devastating corn rootworm species in North America, especially in the midwestern corn-growing areas such as Iowa. A related species, the Northern corn rootworm, D. barberi, co-inhabits in much of the range and is fairly similar in biology.

Two other subspecies of D. virgifera are described, including the Mexican corn rootworm (Diabrotica virgifera zeae), a significant pest in its own right, attacking corn in that country.

Corn rootworm larvae can destroy significant percentages of corn if left untreated. In the United States, current estimates show that 30,000,000 acres (12,000,000 ha) of corn (out of 80 million grown) are infested with corn rootworm. The United States Department of Agriculture estimates that corn rootworms cause $1 billion in lost revenue each year, including $800 million in yield loss and $200 million in cost of treatment for corn growers.

== Life cycle ==
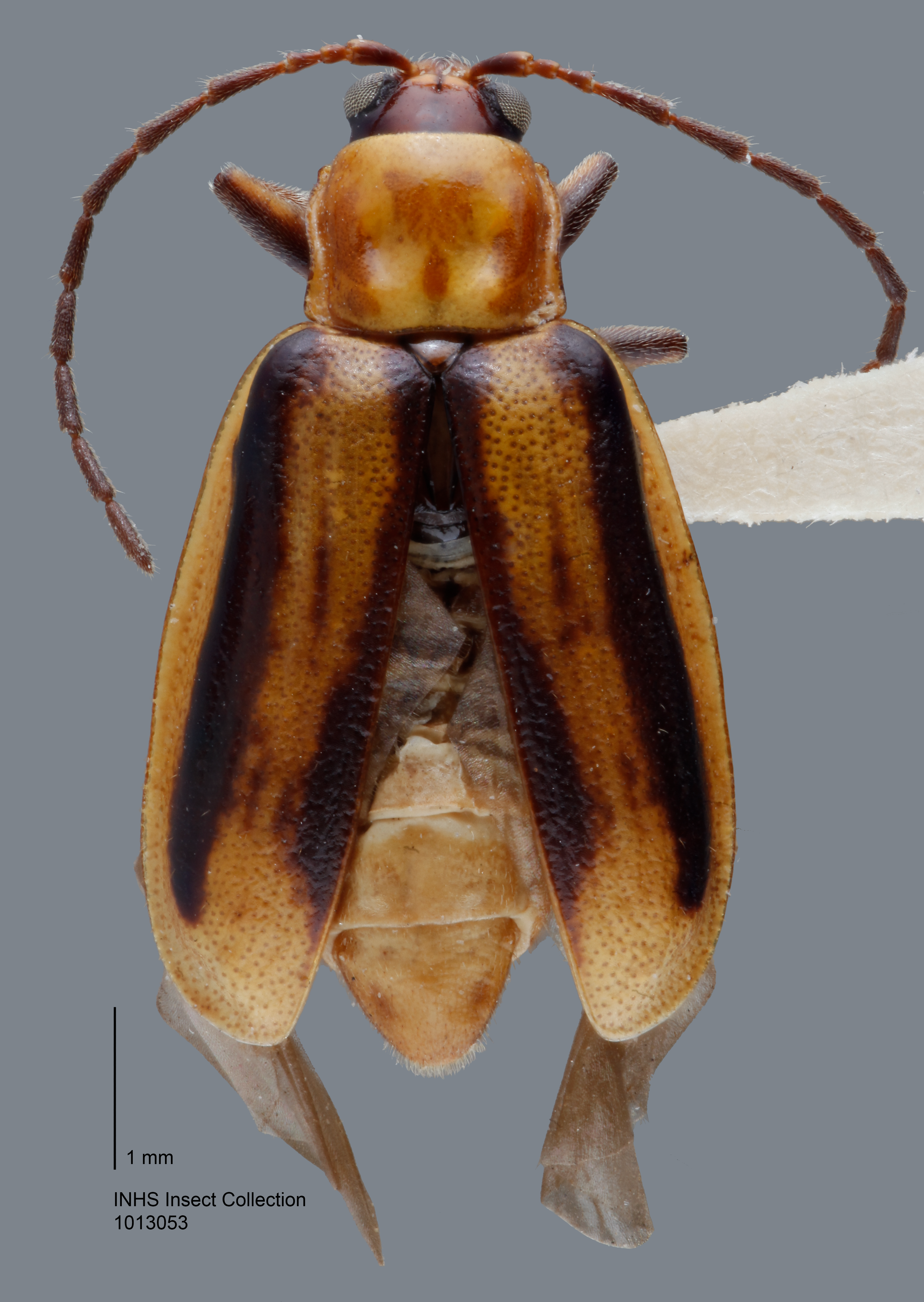
Diabrotica virgifera virgifera.

There are many similarities in the life cycles of the northern and western corn rootworm. Both overwinter in the egg stage in the soil. Eggs, which are deposited in the soil during the summer, are American football-shaped, white, and less than 0.004 inches (0.10 mm) long. Larvae hatch in late May or early June and begin to feed on corn roots. Newly hatched larvae are small, less than .125 inches (3.2 mm) long, white worms. Corn rootworms go through three larval instars, pupate in the soil and emerge as adults in July and August. One generation emerges each year. Larvae have brown heads and a brown marking on the top of the last abdominal segment, giving them a double-headed appearance. Larvae have three pairs of legs, but these are not usually visible without magnification. After feeding for several weeks, the larvae dig a cell in the soil and molt into the pupal stage. The pupal stage is white and has the basic shape of the adult. Adult rootworms are about .25 inches (6.4 mm) long. Western corn rootworms are yellowish with a black stripe on each wing cover. Northern corn rootworm beetles are solid in color and vary from light tan to pale green.

Timing of egg hatch varies from year to year due to temperature differences and location. Males begin to emerge before females. Emergence often continues for a month or more. In years with hot, dry summers, numbers of western corn rootworm beetles may decline rapidly after mid-August, although in summers with less extreme conditions they may be found up until the first frost.

Females mate soon after emergence. Western corn rootworm females need to feed for about two weeks before they can lay eggs. Temperature and food quality influence the pre-oviposition period. Females typically lay eggs in the top 8 inches (200 mm) of soil, although they may be laid more than 12 inches (300 mm) deep, particularly if the soil surface is dry. Western corn rootworm females are more likely to lay some of their eggs below the 8-inch (200 mm) depth than northern corn rootworm females.

== Feeding habits ==
Rootworm larvae can complete development only on corn and a few other species of grasses. Rootworm larvae reared on other grasses (specifically, yellow foxtail) emerged as adults later and had smaller head capsule size as adults compared to larvae reared on corn. Adults feed primarily on corn silk, pollen and kernels on exposed ear tips, although they will feed on leaves and pollen of other plants. Adults begin emerging before corn reproductive tissues are present, adults may feed on leaf tissue, scraping away the green surface tissue and leaving a window-pane appearance. However, adults quickly shift to preferred green silks and pollen as they become available. Northern corn rootworm adults feed on reproductive tissues of the corn plant, but rarely feed on corn leaves. "Northern" adults are more likely than "western" adults to abandon corn and seek pollen or flowers of other plants as corn matures.

== Feeding damage ==
Most of the damage to corn is caused by larval feeding. Hatchlings locate roots and begin feeding on the fine root hairs, burrowing into root tips. As larvae grow, they feed on and tunnel into primary roots. When rootworms are abundant, larval feeding and deterioration of injured roots by root rot pathogens can result in roots being pruned to the stalk base. Severe root injury interferes with the roots' ability to transport water and nutrients, reduces growth and results in reduced grain production. Severe root injury may result in lodging of corn plants, making harvest more difficult. Silk feeding by adults can result in pruning at the ear tip, commonly called silk clipping. In field corn, beetle populations are occasionally high enough to cause severe silk clipping during pollen shed, which may interfere with pollination.

== History of invasions ==
The Western corn rootworm rapidly expanded its range in North America during the second part of the 20th century. It is now present from the southwestern region of the US Corn Belt to the east coast. It was introduced at the end of the 20th century into Europe, where it was first observed near Belgrade, Serbia in 1992. The Serbian outbreak spread north and south to include Greece to Poland and east from Italy to Ukraine. In addition to this large continuous area in Central and southeastern Europe, discontinuous outbreaks have been detected in Europe. The first was discovered near Venice, Italy, in 1998, in northwestern Italy (Piedmont) and Switzerland (canton Ticino) in 2000, northeastern Italy in 2002 (near Pordenone) and 2003 (near Udine), northern Italy (Trentino), Eastern France (Alsace), Switzerland, Belgium, the United Kingdom and the Netherlands in 2003 and the Parisian region, France in 2002, 2004 and 2005. Outbreaks detected in north Switzerland, Belgium, the Netherlands and the Parisian region did not persist. The distribution of the European corn rootworm resulted from several introductions from North America. At least three successive introductions gave rise to outbreaks detected in Serbia in 1992, the Italian Piedmont in 2000, and Ile-de-France in 2002. The European outbreaks observed in Alsace in 2003 and Ile-de-France in 2005 came from two additional introductions from North America, bringing to five the number of transatlantic introductions. The exact North American origin of the European introductions has not yet been found, but the north of the US appears to be the most likely. Small remote outbreaks in southern Germany and north-eastern Italy most likely originated from long-distance dispersal events from Central and southeastern Europe. The large European outbreak is thus likely expanding by stratified dispersal, involving both continuous diffusion and discontinuous long-distance dispersal. This latter mode of dispersal may accelerate expansion in Europe.

== Management ==
Multiple management practices aim to control corn rootworms. These practices include corn variety selection, early planting, insecticides, crop rotation and transgenic corn varieties.

=== Variety ===
No commercial, non-transgenic resistant corn varieties are available. Several hybrid corn traits reduce damage by increasing stalk strength and root mass size. These characteristics allow a plant to better tolerate rootworm feeding, with reduced likelihood of lodging.

=== Early planting ===
Early planted fields that have completed pollen shed are less attractive and therefore have less egg laying activity. Early fields have relatively larger root systems when rootworm feeding starts. This makes them somewhat more tolerant. Practices that promote strong root systems and a generally vigorous crop make corn more tolerant to rootworm feeding and damage.

=== Insecticides ===
Soil-applied insecticides effectively control corn rootworms. Insecticide may be warranted in areas that have a history of moderate to high damage. The number of adults present during the previous growing season is the best guide for selecting fields to be treated. However, in some areas of high insecticide use in central Nebraska, populations of corn rootworm beetles have become resistant to certain insecticides. Aldrin resistance was probably introduced independently, at least twice, from North America into Europe. Organophosphates, such as methyl-parathion, may provide effective control of both larval and adult populations in Central and southeastern Europe and in northwest Italy.

=== Crop rotation ===
Crop rotation is a consistent and economical means of controlling rootworms the season following an outbreak in corn-growing areas where rootworm beetles primarily lay eggs in corn. As a way to reduce rootworm densities, it is more effective than insecticides. Corn rootworm larvae must feed on corn roots to develop and mature properly. If they hatch in a field without corn, they starve because they cannot move more than 10 to 20 inches (510 mm) in search of food. However, two rootworm biotypes survive rotation. The "soybean" variant was first discovered in central Illinois in the late 1980s and spread throughout Illinois, Indiana, southern Wisconsin and eastern Iowa. Instead of laying eggs into a corn field, the females of the soybean variant mate and then fly into a soybean field to lay their eggs, allowing the larvae to hatch in a field likely to rotate back to corn the following year. In the 1980s northern corn rootworm began to be a problem by beating the corn rotation practice with extended diapause eggs. The eggs remained in the soil for two years or more before hatching, thereby avoiding the soybean year. As of 2017, this adaptation has been observed in areas of Iowa, Minnesota and South Dakota, Wisconsin and Nebraska.

Companion or second crop planting can dramatically increase rootworm populations. Corn with pumpkins or corn following pumpkins are examples of planting patterns that exacerbate rootworm feeding pressure.

Shrestha, Dunbar, French and Gassmann have reported that field history causes variation in the degree of corn rootworm resistance. All the fields they found had corn rootworms resistant to the traits, but they observed that significantly more corn rootworm larvae survived in fields with Bt resistance. They recommend faithful crop rotation not only for reducing the population of the worm, but to slow the adaptation of the worm as well.

=== Natural enemies ===
Among natural enemies - Argiope bruennichi, Theridion impressum, Coccinella sp., Pseudophomus rufipes.

=== Transgenics ===
Planting rootworm-resistant transgenic corn is another strategy for minimizing damage. Bt corn is effective at reducing root damage and is safer and often cheaper than insecticide. The transgenic traits, isolated from the common soil bacterium Bacillus thuringiensis strain (often referred to as Bt), produce the insect control protein.

Bt was first discovered in 1901 by Japanese biologist S. Ishiwatari as the source of disease that was killing large populations of silkworms. Bt was first used as an insecticide in 1920 and spray formulations containing either Bt bacteria or Bt proteins came into use in the 1970s for crop protection, including organic farming operations. Bt insecticides saw expanded use and development in the 1980s as an alternative to synthetic insecticides. Beginning in the 1980s, the genes responsible for making Bt proteins were isolated and transferred into corn plants. Bt was commercially approved in transgenic corn seed in the mid-1990s. Compared to spray formulations, transgenic plants with the Bt protein provide much more effective insect protection throughout the season. Other Bt proteins have been used to genetically modify potatoes, cotton and other types of commercial corn. The two most common brands of transgenic Bt corn are Genuity and Herculex. Genuity Smartstax combines Monsanto's VT Triple Pro, Roundup Ready 2, and Acceleron Seed Treatment System technologies, as well as Dow Chemical's Herculex Xtra and Liberty Link technologies. Acceleron, Herculex Xtra, and VT Triple Pro include traits for protection from insect damage.

Bt must be ingested to kill the insect. A susceptible larva eats the protein, which then binds to receptors in the larval gut. Binding initiates a cascade of effects that ultimately leads to death. Bt proteins are highly selective on certain categories and species of insects, eliminating insecticide use and its harmful effects to non-target organisms.

Recently, however, strains of rootworms that exhibit Bt resistance have been discovered in several Midwestern US states. According to Monsanto, the "YieldGard VT Triple and Genuity VT Triple PRO corn products" are affected. In 2009, four strains in Iowa were found to have field-evolved resistance to Bt corn. Some rootworms were found to be resistant to two or more Bt toxins in addition to being tolerant to crop rotation. This ability to rapidly evolve to adapt to multiple traits in their new food source has proved to be a challenge for farmers and scientists. That same year, Monsanto, DuPont Pioneer, Syngenta and Dow Agro-Sciences all began to sell "stacked" or pyramid corn seed designed to slow the development of resistance. These products combined traits to increase effectiveness, however, so many of these traits are failing that soon they will run out of ingredients to stack. A new bacterial gene has been discovered by researchers that will kill rootworms, but it is not expected to be available to farmers before 2029.

By 2014 Syngenta Agrisure RW-rootworm strains had been detected in Iowa as well as glyphosate. Agrisure RW-based products entered the market in 2007. However, government officials, academics and companies lack consensus on how to define the resistance phenomenon. The affected fields constituted 0.2% of transgenic US corn acres. Further the affected areas had not been rotated with other crops.

As of December 2018, the corn rootworm has been found to be resistant to all four traits.

=== Biological solutions ===
In Austria, an innovative protection method has been developed, using the "mating disruption" method for the first time in corn fields. The according product is called CornProtect. The female bugs distribute pheromones that attract males. With that new method, such pheromones are put on specially treated mineral carriers and are slowly released over the full flying period of the bugs. Mating is significantly reduced, because males become disoriented and less interested in copulating. Reproduction is drastically reduced The application is done with conventional field sprayers which makes it economically very viable.
