= B. R. Barwale =

Indian farmer (1931–2017)

- Born: 1931; Hingoli
- Died: 24 July 2017 (86); Mumbai
- Occupation: Farmer
- Awards: World Food Prize, 1998; Padma Bhushan, 2001

Badrinarayan Ramulal Barwale (1931 – 24 July 2017) is one of the most regarded personality in the Indian seeds industry, who revolutionised farming practices by producing cheaper and higher-yield seeds in the Marathwada region of India.

Barwale was born in 1931 in Hingoli, Nizam state (now Maharashtra), India. He began farming on his family's land in the 1950s, experimenting with a high-yield okra hybrid given to him at the World Agricultural Fair in New Delhi. In 1964, he started the Maharashtra Hybrid Seeds Company, also known as Mahyco, where he cultivated the higher efficiency seeds and began selling them to area farmers at an affordable price. Mahyco expanded to a network of farmers producing new seed varieties of several different crops. By providing assistance and guaranteeing loans for farmers cultivating Mahyco's seeds, Barwale's team was able to gain valuable feedback on various crop strains and make subsequent improvements to their yield and quality.

Barwale was awarded the 12th World Food Prize in 1998 for his work in providing affordable, high-yield seed varieties and agronomic training to farmers across India. The President of India awarded him the Padma Bhushan award in 2001 for his distinguished service in the field of trade and economic activity.

He died on 24 July 2017 in Mumbai at the age of 86.
