= Acceleron Seed Treatment System =

For mold, mildew, insects - by Monsanto

Acceleron Seed Treatment system is a seed coating that protects from insects as well as mold, mildew, and disease. It was developed and patented by Monsanto. The Acceleron Seed Treatment System is available for Genuity Roundup Ready 2 yield soybeans and Smartstax seeds. The coating contains the fungicide pyraclostrobin and Imidacloprid, a neonicotinoid insecticide.
