= Genetically modified brinjal =

Variety of brinjal

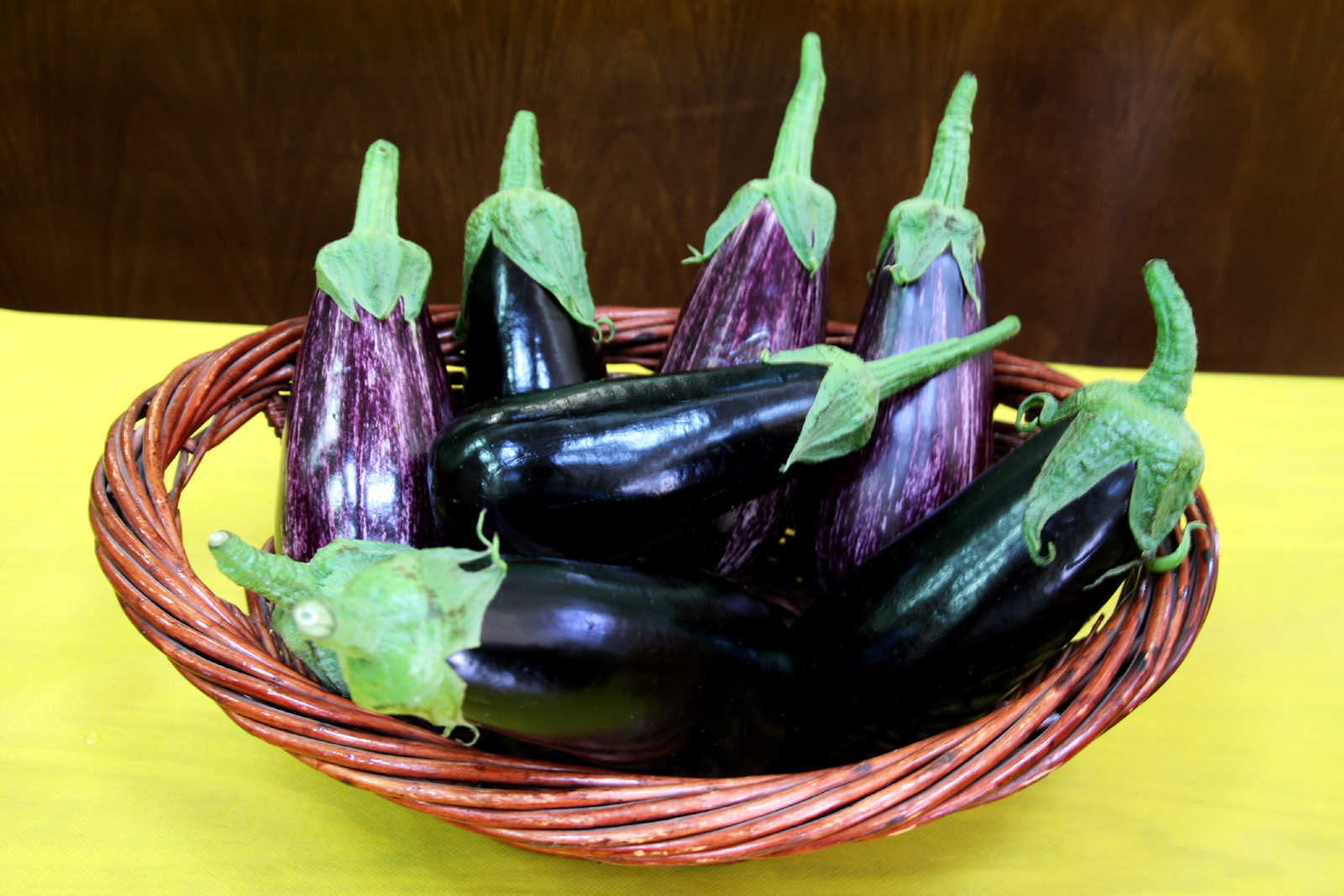
Genetically modified brinjals called "Corbeille d'aubergines"

The genetically modified brinjal is a suite of transgenic brinjals (also known as eggplant or aubergine) created by inserting a crystal protein gene (Cry1Ac) from the soil bacterium Bacillus thuringiensis into the genome of various brinjal cultivars. The insertion of the gene, along with other genetic elements such as promoters, terminators and an antibiotic resistance marker gene into the brinjal plant is accomplished using Agrobacterium-mediated genetic transformation. The Bt brinjal has been developed to give resistance against lepidopteron insects, in particular, the Brinjal Fruit and Shoot Borer (Leucinodes orbonalis)(FSB), by forming pores in the insects' digestive system. Mahyco, an Indian seed company based in Jalna, Maharashtra, has developed the Bt brinjal.

The genetically modified brinjal event is termed Event EE 1, and Mahyco has also applied for approval of two brinjal hybrids. Event EE 1 was introduced by breeding the plants into various local varieties by University of Agricultural Sciences, Dharwad and Tamil Nadu Agricultural University, Coimbatore. Some of the cultivars of Brinjal include Malpur local, Manjari gota, Kudachi local, Udupi local, 112 GO, and Pabkavi local. It was approved for commercialization in India in 2009, but after a public outcry and rounds of debates in which representatives from Mahyco, the scientific community, and non-governmental organizations spoke on the topic, the Indian Environment Minister, Jairam Ramesh, facilitated a moratorium on its release until further unspecified tests were conducted. Bt brinjal was approved for commercial release in Bangladesh in 2013.

By 2021, it had been cultivated by nearly 65,000 farmers with an approximate 6x net return, and about 20% of farmers used seeds from previous seasons.

== Development ==
Mahyco licensed and used the cry1Ac gene obtained from Monsanto and two supporting genes (nptII and aad). The cry1Ac gene is under the transcriptional control of an enhanced cauliflower mosaic virus 35S (CaMV35S) promoter, which ensures the gene is expressed in all the brinjal's tissue throughout its complete life cycle. NptII and aad are selectable marker genes, nptII is used to identify transgenic plants from non-transgenic, and aad is used to identify the transformed bacteria used during the development of the construct. Aad contains a bacterial promoter and is not expressed in the Bt brinjal. The completed construct was inserted into young cotyledons from the brinjal plants using an Agrobacterium-mediated technique. Agrobacterium naturally inserts DNA into plants from its Ti plasmid, and scientists use this to insert genes of interest into various plants. The transformed plants were regenerated and analyzed for the presence of the gene through Southern blotting. The plants' progeny were also analyzed to identify lines segregating in a Mendelian fashion.

== Attempted commercialization in India ==
The first agreement to develop Bt Brinjal was signed in 2005 between India's leading seed company, Maharashtra Hybrid Company, better known as Mahyco, and two agricultural universities - University of Agricultural Sciences, Dharwad (UAS) and Tamil Nadu Agricultural University (TNAU) in Coimbatore.

An expert committee (EC-I) was set up in 2006 to examine the biosafety data presented by Mahyco. They concluded that while the current data demonstrated that Bt brinjal was safe and equivalent to its non-Bt counterpart, more studies were required to re-affirm the findings, and further trials were needed to ascertain the benefits of Bt brinjal with respect to existing methods for pest management and pesticide reduction. They recommended that large-scale trials be allowed to go ahead. In 2009, a second expert committee (EC-II) examined the data from these trials. They concluded that adequate safety tests had been performed, stating that "the benefits of Bt brinjal event EE-I developed by M/s Mahyco far outweigh the perceived and projected risks", and advised the Genetic Engineering Appraisal Committee (GEAC) to recommend commercialization of the Bt brinjal.

The GEAC cleared Bt brinjal for commercialization on 14 October 2009. Following concerns raised by some scientists, farmers and anti-GMO activists, the government of India officially announced on 9 February 2010 that it needed more time before releasing Bt brinjal, with Indian Environment Minister Jairam Ramesh saying that there is no overriding urgency to introduce Bt brinjal in India. On 17 February 2010, Jairam Ramesh reiterated that the centre had only imposed a moratorium on the release of transgenic brinjal hybrid, and not a permanent ban, saying that "until we arrive at a political, scientific and societal consensus, this moratorium will remain". Companies with any seeds of Bt brinjal will have to register the details with the government, and the National Bureau of Plant Genetic Resources (NBPGR) was made responsible for the storage of all the Bt brinjal seeds in India. Independent testing labs are currently being set up.

An irregularity was also brought to the notice of the Karnataka Biodiversity Board by Environment Support Group, a charitable trust in Bengaluru, in February 2010. It found that agencies accessed at least 10 brinjal varieties from Karnataka and Tamil Nadu without seeking prior consent of the National Biodiversity Authority and state biodiversity boards. Mahyco became India's first commercial entity to be accused of bio-piracy, or misappropriation, of local germplasm. In October 2013, the Indian High Court was pursuing criminal proceedings against senior officials of Mahyco-Monsanto. In June 2019 1,500 farmers gathered in India to protest and illegally plant GMO Brinjal seeds. In 2022, the GEAC again approved Bt Brinjal for commercialization, but public opposition has stopped it from being used.

== Commercial cultivation in Bangladesh ==
On 30 October 2013, with approvals from the ministries of Environment and Forests (MoEF) and Agriculture (MoA), the Bangladesh Agricultural Research Institute (BARI) received permission to release four varieties of Bt brinjal in time for the 2013–2014 growing season: Bt Uttara, Bt Kajla, Bt Nayantara, and Bt ISD006. The Bt varieties underwent seven years of field and greenhouse trials in various environmental and geographic locations in Bangladesh

Saplings were distributed to 20 farmers in January 2014 The Guardian spoke to 19 of 20 farmers growing the Bt brinjal crop in 2014 and established that it has so far had mixed results. In September 2016, the Indian Business Standard quoted a director of the Bangladesh Department of Environment who said that production results had been very good from the 200–300 farmers who had grown the bt brinjal since 2013 but it was too early to judge whether there had been any contamination of wild brinjal.

In 2017, 6,512 farmers grew Bt Brinjal and 27,012 in 2018. A 2019 report found that as a result of growing Bt Brinjal there was a 39% reduction in the use of pesticides and the yield of Bt Brinjal was also 43% higher. With reduced costs of pesticides and increased yield, profit of farmers increased by nearly $400 per hectare.

A 2020 report found that farmers have achieved significantly higher yields and revenues by growing Bt brinjal. The four Bt brinjal varieties yielded on average 19.6 percent more than non-Bt varieties and earned growers 21.7 percent higher revenue. 83.1% of Bt brinjal growers were satisfied with the yields obtained and 80.6% were satisfied with the quality of fruit, compared to just 58.7% of non-Bt brinjal growers who were pleased with their yields. Several other trials have produced similarly positive results, and a few in areas with high pest pressure achieved multiplication of yield several times without the need for further insecticide inputs.

At the 2020 AAAS, it was announced that over 31,000 farmers in Bangladesh are now growing Bt brinjal.

A randomized controlled trial performed between 2017 and 2018 found that Bt brinjal increased net yields by 51%. Bt brinjal farmers used smaller quantities of pesticides and sprayed less frequently. Bt brinjal reduced the toxicity of pesticides by as much as 76%. Farmers growing Bt brinjal and who had pre‐existing chronic conditions consistent with pesticide poisoning were 11.5% points less likely to report a symptom of pesticide poisoning.

== Philippines ==
Scientists from the University of the Philippines Los Baños-Institute of Plant Breeding (UPLB-IPB) are currently developing a version of GM Brinjal.

In July 2021, the Philippine Department of Agriculture-Bureau of Plant Industry approved GM Brinjal for 'direct use as food, feed, or for processing'.

In October 2022, the Philippine government approved the commercial growing of GM Brinjal (Eggplant).

On 17 April 2024, the Court of Appeals in the Philippines issued a cease-and-desist order on the commercial propagation of two genetically modified crops, golden rice and Bt eggplant, citing a lack of "full scientific certainty" regarding their health and environmental impact. The decision was in response to a petition filed by groups including Magsasaka at Siyentipiko para sa Pag-unlad Agrikultura (Masipag) and Greenpeace Southeast Asia. The court revoked the biosafety permits previously granted by the government to the University of the Philippines Los Baños (UPLB) and the Philippine Rice Research Institute (PhilRice).

== Controversy ==
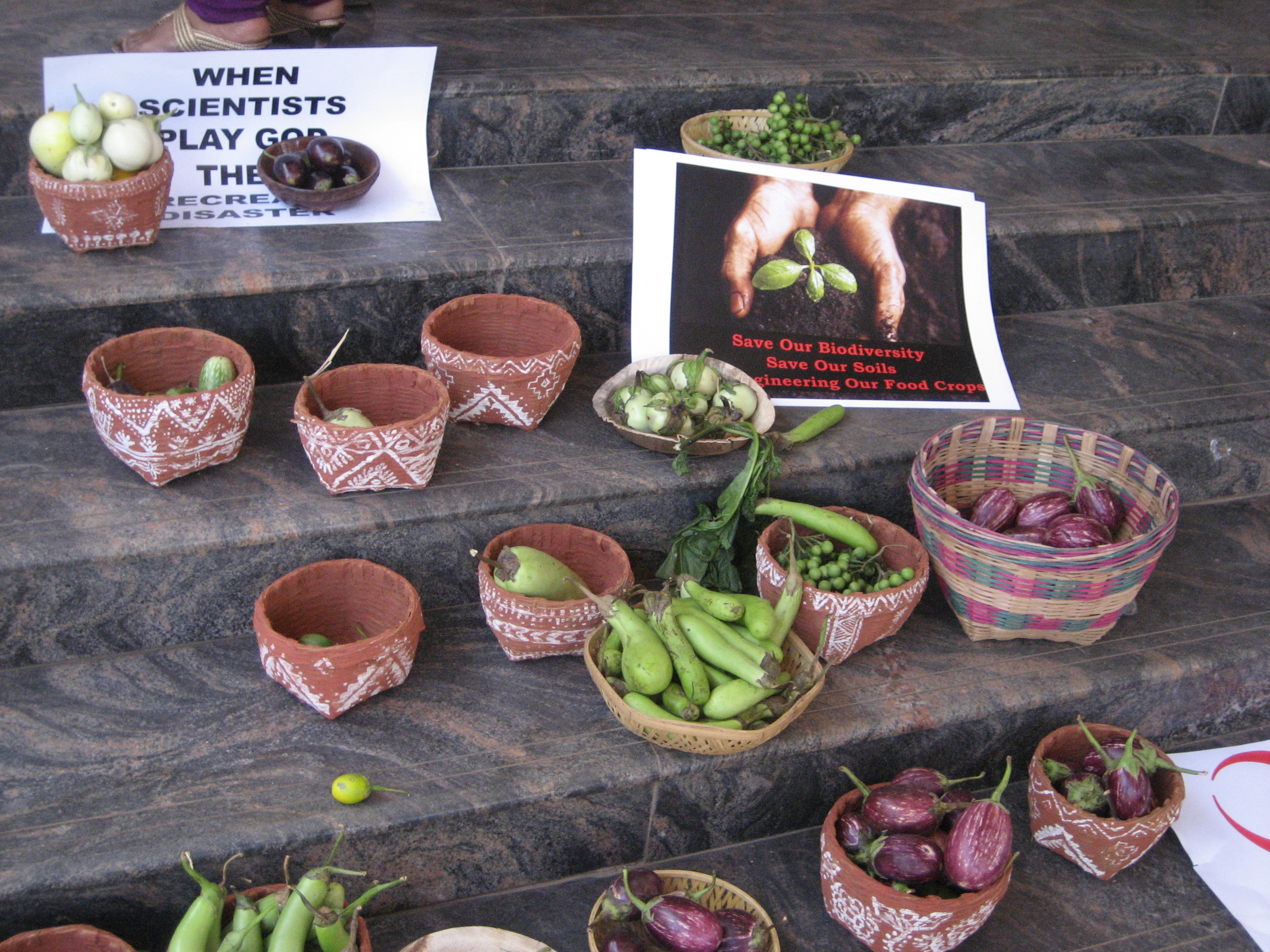
Many cultivars of eggplants displayed by protesters on the steps during the Feb. 2010 listening tour by India's environmental minister relating to BT Brinjal, in Bangalore, India

Many controversies surround the development and release of genetically modified foods, ranging from human safety and environmental impacts to ethical concerns such as corporate control of the food supply and intellectual property rights. The brinjal is an important food crop for India, and the potential commercialization of a genetically modified variety has drawn support and criticism. Although it is a major food crop in India, brinjal production is relatively low with fruit and shoot borer infestation a major constraint to yield. Proponents of the technology believe the Bt brinjal will have positive effects for the Indian economy and the health of the farmers. Field trials conducted on research-managed farms carried out by Mahyco and the Indian Council of Agricultural Research suggested a 42% pesticide reduction and a doubling of the yield was possible. The economic gain for consumers, developers and farmers was estimated to potentially be US$108 million per year with an additional $3–4 million saved due to health benefits associated with decreased pesticide use.

A French scientist notable for his anti-GM perspective, Gilles-Eric Seralini, raised concerns about some of the differences between feeding trials using the genetically modified and unmodified brinjal, and criticized some of the testing protocols. The EC-II responded to the concerns raised by Seralini and other scientists in their report, New Zealand epidemiologist Lou Gallagher also criticised the feeding trials saying that the raw data indicated toxic effects were associated with rats that were fed Bt Brinjal. Concerns have also been raised about a possible conflict of interest, with some of the scientists appointed to the GEAC being involved in developing their own GM products, that the decision by the EC-II was not unanimous, and about the reliability of safety data originating from Mahcyo run trials. The imposed moratorium has been criticized by some scientists as not being based on any compelling scientific evidence and potentially setting Indian biotechnology back decades. Others feel the critical issue is not the safety of the GM technology, but its corporatization and there are claims that India's crop protection industry was a major player in preventing the commercialization of Bt brinjal. India's National Biodiversity Authority is probing the crop scientists involved in developing the Bt brinjal for allegedly violating India's Biological Diversity Act, 2002 by using local cultivars and foreign technology without their permission. The Parliamentary Committee on Agriculture on 9 August 2012 asked the Government to stop all field trials and sought a ban on GM food crops like Bt brinjal. It also sought a "thorough probe" as to how permission was given to commercialise Bt brinjal seed when all evaluation tests were not carried out. The committee's report was tabled a day after the Maharashtra government canceled Mahyco's license to sell its Bt cotton seeds.

== See also ==
- Bt cotton
- Bt Eggplant Resource
