= Corn earworm =

Corn earworm may refer to:

- Helicoverpa armigera, a species of moth widespread across Europe, Asia, Africa, Australia, and Oceania
- Helicoverpa zea, a species of moth widespread across the Americas
