= Cry34Ab1 =

Bacterial toxins

13.6 kDa insecticidal crystal protein

Identifiers
- Organism: Bacillus thuringiensis
- Symbol: Cry34Ab1
- UniProt: Q939T0
Search for
- Structures: Swiss-model
- Domains: InterPro

43.8 kDa insecticidal crystal protein

Identifiers
- Organism: Bacillus thuringiensis
- Symbol: Cry35Ab1
- UniProt: Q939S9
Search for
- Structures: Swiss-model
- Domains: InterPro

Cry34Ab1 is one member of a binary Bacillus thuringiensis (Bt) crystal protein set isolated from Bt strain PS149B1. The protein exists as a 14 kDa aegerolysin that, in presence of Cry35Ab1, exhibits insecticidal activity towards Western Corn Rootworm. The protein has been transformed into maize plants under the commercialized events 4114 (DP-ØØ4114-3) by Pioneer Hi-Bred and 59122 (DAS-59122-7) by Dow AgroSciences. These events have, in turn, been bred into multiple trait stacks in additional products.

Cry34/35Ab1 binary toxins bind to the insect's brush border membrane vesicles (BBMVs) of cells in the epithelial lining of midgut, where they form pores; this leads to necrosis and, eventually, the insect's death. The Cry35Ab1 (45 kDa) protein does not convey specificity in the absence of Cry34Ab1, indicating that the smaller 14 kDa Cry34Ab1 protein is critical for BBMV binding and recruitment of Cry35Ab1 to induce insecticidal effect.

Cry34Ab1 is unrelated to Bt delta-endotoxins. It is an aegerolysin (Pfam PF06355) composed of two beta sheets in a beta-sandwich structure; the total protein is composed of 117 amino acid residues and contains a hydrophobic core. Its family placement shows that interaction with cell membranes is consistent with its role in the binary Cry34Ab1/Cry35Ab1 toxin complex. The partner toxin, Cry35Ab1, is a prototypical member of its own group (Pfam PF05431). Its structure is similar to that of aerolysin, Cry45Aa1, and Cry46Aa1.
