= Cry1Ac =

Crystal protein

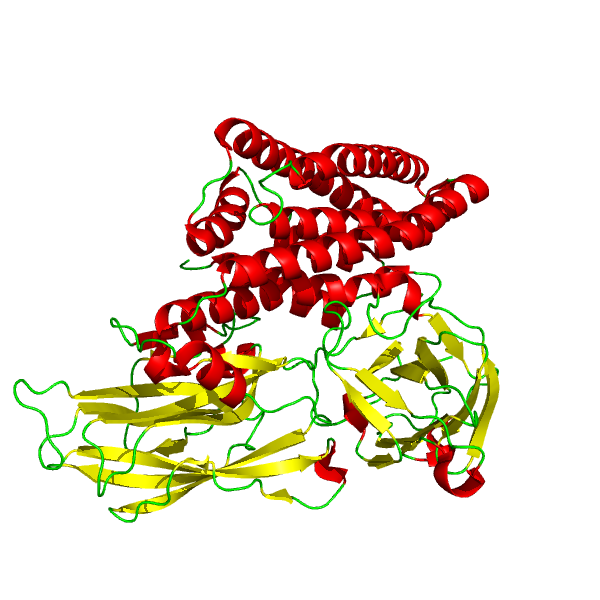
- Toxin Cry1Ac from Bacillus thuringiensis ssp. kurstaki HD-73. PDB entry 4arx

Identifiers
- Organism: Bacillus thuringiensis
- Symbol: Cry1Ac
- Orthologs: OMA: entry
- UniProt: P05068
Search for
- Structures: Swiss-model
- Domains: InterPro

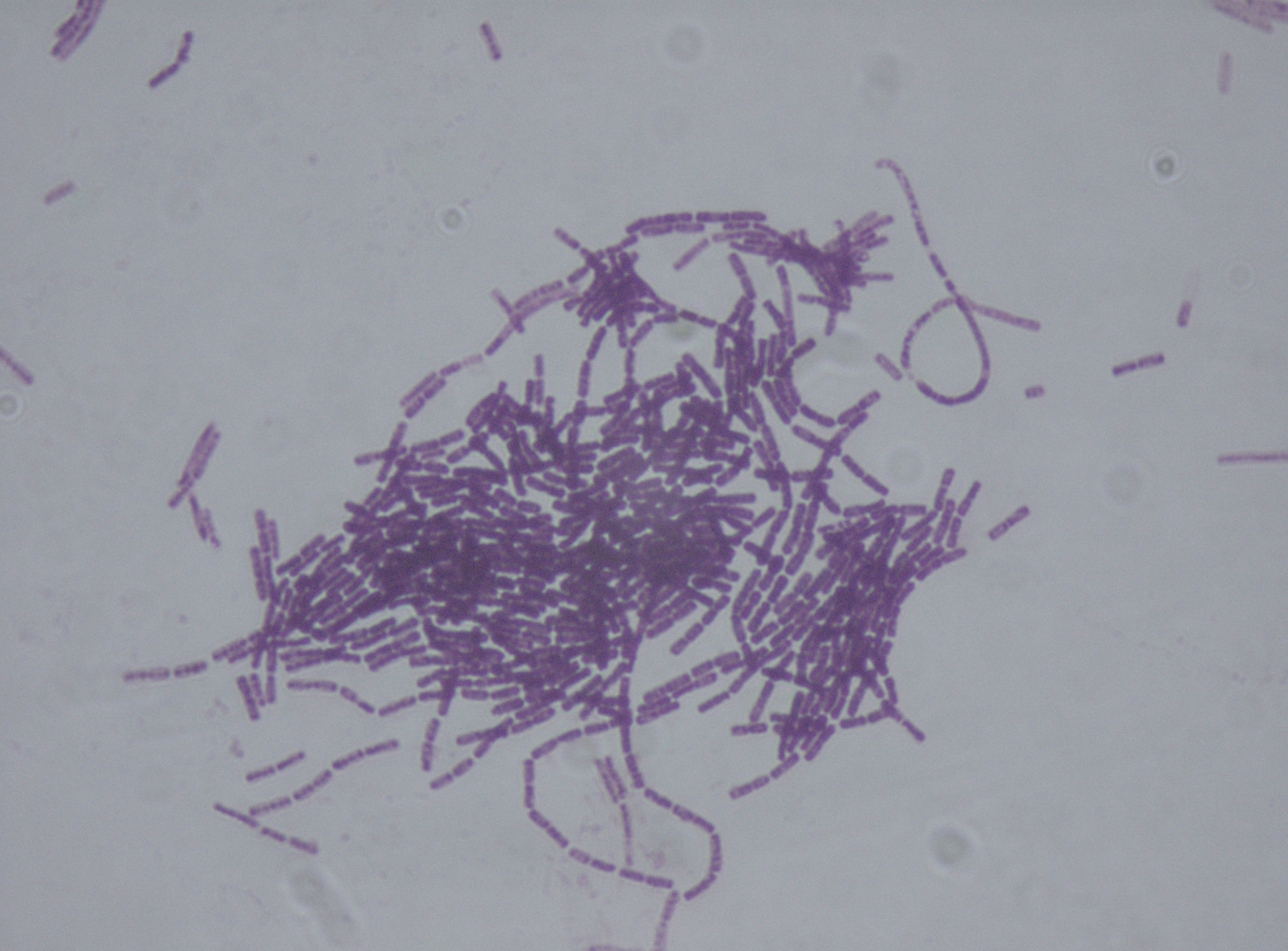
Gram-positive soil bacterium, Bacillus thuringiensis (Bt)

Cry1Ac is a delta endotoxin crystal protein that is produced by gram-positive soil bacterium, Bacillus thuringiensis (Bt) during sporulation, which is dependent on the bacterial strain in numbers and types 5,19, and 43. Bt bacterium spores are toxic if they are ingested by the members of the Lepidoptera order, as the bacterium acts as an insecticide to the larvae.

Because of this, the genes for these have been introduced into commercially important crops by genetic engineering in order to confer pest resistance on those plants

== Mode of action ==
An accepted model of the toxin is when it becomes ingested by lepidoptera, the larvae becomes activated due to the gut enzymes and the crystal's solubility characteristics. Initially the crystals are inactive and therefore insoluble, until they are in alkaline conditions. When ingested by lepidoptera larvae, they are susceptible to Bt because the pH of their midguts meet the alkaline conditions for the protoxin to become active. The activation follows a series of steps that evidently leads to the death of the insect. Beginning in the insect's gut, when the bacterium enters the gut the crystals dissolve and the protoxins activate because of the insect's midgut protease, then its followed by the recognition of the binding site on the midgut's brush border membrane, leading to the pore formation that disrupts the transport of the membrane, resulting in the protoxin becoming entomocidal.

== Receptor binding in lepidopteran larvae ==
Cry1A toxins in different lepidopteran insects contain different binding receptors. Four binding sites have been identified:

- Cadherin-like protein (CADR)
- Glycosylphosphatidyl-inositol (GPI)-anchored aminopoptidase-N (APN)
- GPI-anchored alkaline phosphatase (ALP)
- Glycoconjugate

== Structure ==
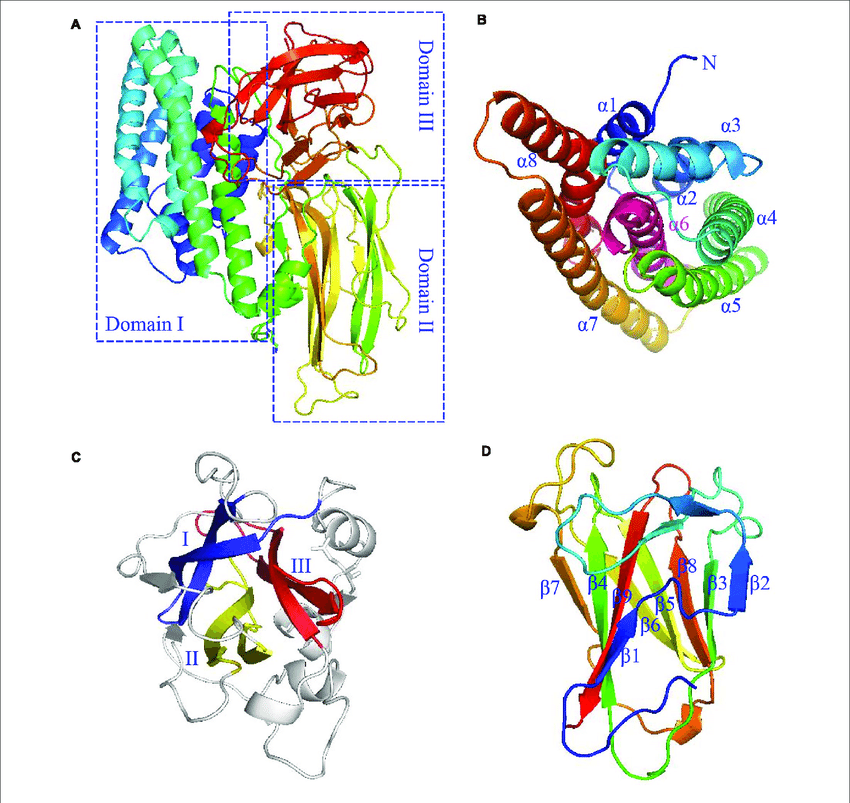
Three domain structure of Cry1Ac boxed in blue lines to showcase the visual representation of Domains I, II, and III

The structure of the protein is similar to others of the Cry family, as seen through x-ray diffractions. Proteins Cry1Aa, Cry3A, and CytB to be specific, share a similar globular molecules that contain a three domain structure that are connected by singular links.

- Domain I, is composed of hydrophobic and amphipathic alpha helices. The domain is located at the activated protein's end of the N-terminal and where pore formation of the cell membrane takes place.
- Domain II, is composed of anti-parallel beta sheets. Cry1Ac and other similar toxins contain fragments that determine the specificity and receptor binding sites to a number of toxins in domain II.
- Domain III, is also composed of beta sheets and is involved in specificity as domain II, but also is involved in structural stability

Due to the similarities of Domain II and III to those of carbohydrate binding proteins, it has been suggested that carbohydrate moieties might have a role in the mode of action in Cry toxins that contain three domain structures.

== Applications of cry toxins ==
Bt toxins are used as insecticides on lepidoptera larvae but the toxin its self has achieved three major applications:

1. Control of pests in the forest
2. Controlling of vectors for human diseases
3. Development of insect resistant plants

The control of forest pests is the most successful applications of the three. The success of pest control in forests is mostly reflected in the United States and Canada. The use of the insecticides relied on the Bt strain of HD-1, which produces a variety of Cry toxins such as: Cry1Aa, Cry1Ab, Cry1Ac, and Cry2Aa. The success of Bt application is not only dependent on the susceptibility of the bacterium on the larvae but also outside factors such as, weather conditions, timing, and dosage of the insecticide spray. A proper combination determines the likelihood of the larvae ingesting the toxins.

== Environmental impact ==
Cry1Ac is considered more environmentally friendly since it is a soil dwelling bacterium, it had greatly reduced the use of chemical insecticides for pest control. This is beneficial because it targets specific insect groups without affecting other organisms and the overall ecosystem of the forests and other vegetation. Making them safe to use since that are nontoxic to humans, livestock, and other wildlife.

The success of the substitution of chemical insecticides for environmental alternatives can be seen in the development of transgenic crops. Bt Cry proteins in transgenic crops is continuously being produced, which in turn is protecting the toxin form degrading. Notably, the rise of insect-resistant crops has had a positive effect on crop yield, specifically on Bt cotton, Bt brinjal, Bt soybean, and Bt rice.

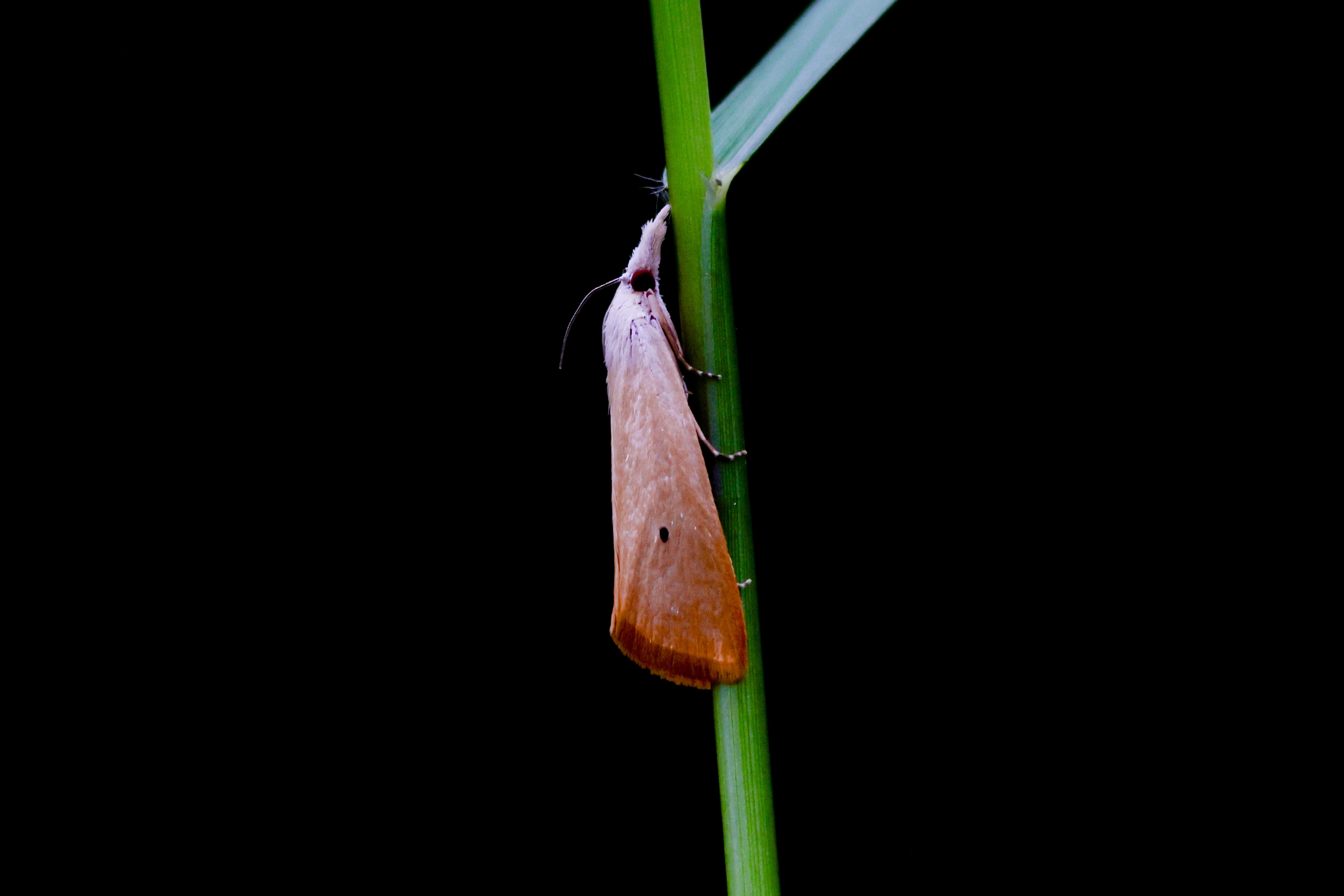
Rice yellow steam borer

An example of the success of crop yield, rice is one of the most important and essential crops for many countries. Before the use of insecticide, many members of the lepidopteran group would affect indica rice plants. Specifically Yellow steam borer (YSB), Scipophaga incertulas, as the larvae would cut holes into the steams of the rice plants and then enter into the tissues of the plants. Resulting in mass damages to the plants and in turn effecting the yield of crop production. But the introduction of Cry1Ac to the transgenic rice plant significantly reduced the amount of damage YSB did to the rice yield. Although transgenic crops have received attention due to a number of issues, including genetically modified food controversies, and the Séralini affair.

== Resistance ==
In addition it does rise some concerns for long term use. With eventual long term use the level of effectiveness will come into question as resistance will begin to develop as well as the gene flow of the crops and insects. The use of the insecticide on Bt cotton fields in Australia, China, Spain, and the United States had created a major potential for insect resistance. Potential reasons for resistance could be mutations that affect binding receptors, protease, or immune response. It is also believed that the hydrophobic tail and GPI-linked of the Bt toxins can affect the insects' resistance to the insecticide.

== Medical use ==
Cry1Ac has also been used to develop medical uses, as Bt is an immunogen and a mucosal adjuvant in mammals.

A vaccine use for Cry1Ac is it could act as a carrier for the development of oral vaccines (drops or capsules). Since it can target gut-associated lymphoid tissue (GALT) naturally, it is best suited for mucosal immunity. Considering most pathogens enter the body through the respiratory tract, mucosa, and gut the administration being given orally potentially provides advantages in safety for medical providers and patients and lower costs.

In trials, when administered orally it resulted in systemic and mucosal antibody responses, while also showing no significant toxicity.

In a more recent study, Cry1Ac has proven it is mucosal adjuvant meaning that it can provide protective immunity against lethal diseases. Specifically against primary amoebic meningoencephalitis (PAM) due to brain eating amoeba, Naegleria fowleri. This amoeba can invade and attack the human nervous system and brain, which is nearly always fatal. When a Naegleria fowleri infection is usually contracted it begins in the nasal mucosa, making the use if Cry1Ac ideal. When Cry1Ac is administered it alone proved to provide 60% protection against the disease. The high protection rate proposes Cry1Ac could stimulate the immune response and the adaptive antibodies.

== See also ==
- Bacillus thruingiensis
- Cry toxins
- Genetically modified organism
