= LibertyLink =

LibertyLink is a BASF-owned brand of genes for use in agriculture providing tolerance to Liberty herbicide and glufosinate (a.k.a. Liberty or Basta). The genes were developed by Bayer CropScience, before being sold to BASF Ag in late 2017. LibertyLink provides an herbicide resistance system that is still effective in the presence of glyphosate resistant weeds. The gene which gives resistance to glufosinate is a bar or pat gene which was first isolated from two species of Streptomyces bacteria. Glufosinate was included in a biocide ban proposed by the Swedish Chemicals Agency and approved by the European Parliament on January 13, 2009.

== Crops ==
The LibertyLink gene is available in a variety of crops including corn, cotton, canola, sugarbeet and soybean. It is not available in rice.

== Contamination lawsuit ==
In 2006, the U.S. Department of Agriculture announced that Bayer CropScience's LibertyLink genetically modified rice had contaminated the U.S. rice supply. Shortly after the public learned of the contamination, the E.U. banned imports of U.S. long-grain rice and the futures price plunged. In April 2010, a Lonoke County, Arkansas jury awarded a dozen farmers $48 million. The case was appealed to the Arkansas Supreme Court, which affirmed the judgement. On 1 July 2011, Bayer CropScience agreed to a global settlement for up to $750 million.
