= Bt cotton =

Genetically modified variety of cotton

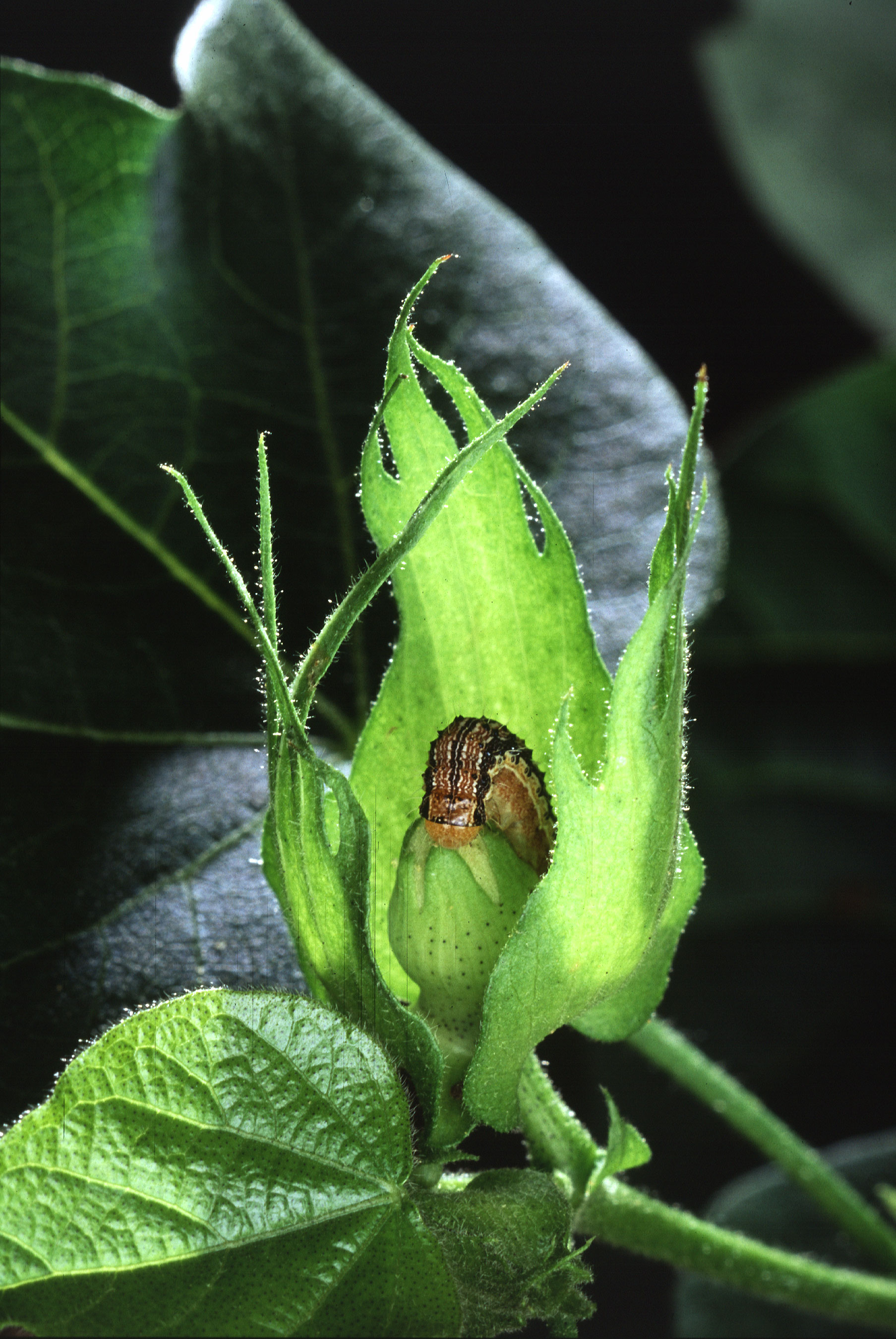
Cotton bollworm

Bt cotton is a genetically modified pest resistant plant cotton variety that produces an insecticide to combat bollworm. Strains of the bacterium Bacillus thuringiensis produce different Bt toxins, and the gene for the toxin has been inserted into the cotton. It was first approved for commercial use in the United States in 1995.

== Description ==
Strains of the bacterium Bacillus thuringiensis produce over 200 different Bt toxins, each harmful to different insects. Most notably, Bt toxins are insecticidal to the larvae of moths and butterflies, beetles, cotton bollworms and flies but are harmless to other forms of life. The gene coding for Bt toxin has been inserted into cotton as a transgene, causing it to produce this natural insecticide in its tissues. In many regions, the main pests in commercial cotton are lepidopteran larvae, which are killed by the Bt protein in the genetically modified cotton they eat. This eliminates the need to use large amounts of broad-spectrum insecticides to kill lepidopteran pests (some of which have developed pyrethroid resistance). This spares natural insect predators in the farm ecology and further contributes to noninsecticide pest management.

Bt cotton is ineffective against many cotton pests such as plant bugs, stink bugs, and aphids; depending on circumstances it may be desirable to use insecticides in prevention. A 2006 study done by Cornell researchers, the Center for Chinese Agricultural Policy and the Chinese Academy of Sciences on Bt cotton farming in China found that after seven years these secondary pests that were normally controlled by pesticide had increased, necessitating the use of pesticides at similar levels to non-Bt cotton and causing less profit for farmers because of the extra expense of GM seeds.

== Mechanism ==
Bt cotton was created through the addition of genes encoding toxin crystals in the Cry group of endotoxin. When insects attack and eat the cotton plant the Cry toxins or crystal protein are dissolved due to the high pH level of the insect's stomach. The dissolved and activated Cry molecules bond to cadherin-like proteins on cells comprising the brush border molecules. The epithelium of the brush border membranes separates the body cavity from the gut while allowing access to nutrients. The Cry toxin molecules attach themselves to specific locations on the cadherin-like proteins present on the epithelial cells of the midgut and ion channels are formed which allow the flow of potassium. Regulation of potassium concentration is essential and, if left unchecked, causes death of cells. Due to the formation of Cry ion channels sufficient regulation of potassium ions is lost, resulting in the death of epithelial cells. The death of such cells creates gaps in the brush border

== History ==
Bt cotton was first approved for field trials in the United States in 1993, and first approved for commercial use in the United States in 1995. Bt cotton was approved by the Chinese government in 1997.

In 2002, a joint venture between Monsanto and Mahyco introduced Bt cotton to India.

In 2011, India grew the largest GM cotton crop at 10.6 million hectares. The U.S. GM cotton crop was 4.0 million hectares, the second largest area in the world, followed by China with 3.9 million hectares and Pakistan with 2.6 million hectares. By 2014, 96% of cotton grown in the United States was genetically modified and 95% of cotton grown in India was GM. India is the largest producer of cotton, and GM cotton, as of 2014.

== Advantages ==
Bt cotton has several advantages over non-Bt cotton. The important advantages of Bt cotton are briefly :

- Increases yield of cotton due to effective control of three types of bollworms, viz. American, Spotted and Pink bollworms.
- Insects belonging to Lepidoptera (Bollworms) are sensitive to a crystalline endotoxic protein produced by the Bt gene which in turn protects cotton from bollworms.
- Reduction in insecticide use in the cultivation of Bt cotton in which bollworms are major pests.
- Potential reduction in the cost of cultivation (depending on seed cost versus insecticide costs).
- Reduction in predators which help in controlling the bollworms by feeding on larvae and eggs of bollworm.

The main selling points of Bt cotton are the reductions in pesticides to be sprayed on a crop and the ecological benefits which stem from that. China first planted Bt cotton in 1997 specifically in response to an outbreak of cotton bollworm, Helicoverpa armigera, that farmers were struggling to control with conventional pesticides. Similarly in India and the US, Bt cotton initially alleviated the issues with pests whilst increasing yields and delivering higher profits for farmers.

Studies showed that the lower levels of pesticide being sprayed on the cotton crops promoted biodiversity by allowing non-target species like ladybirds, lacewings and spiders to become more abundant. Likewise it was found that integrated pest management strategies (IPM) were becoming more effective due to the lower levels of pesticide encouraging the growth of natural enemy populations.

In India alone widespread adoption of Bt cotton led to 2.4-9 million less cases of pesticide poisoning, with similar reduction also seen in other countries.

== Bt-resistant pests ==
After the introduction of Bt cotton in northern China, non-target pests such as mirid bugs (Heteroptera: Miridae) became more abundant, because less pesticide was being sprayed. In 2013, a second issue being seen across the world, was the development of Bt resistant pests limiting the usefulness of Bt crops.

Main drivers for the widespread resistance in India and China included the high proportion of Bt cotton being planted, 90% and 95% respectively in 2011, and few refuge areas.

Refuge areas of non-Bt crops limit resistance development in targeted pests. The US Environmental Protection Agency requires farmers to have refuge areas of 20–50% non-Bt crops within 0.8 km of their Bt fields. Such requirements were not seen in China, where instead farmers relied on natural refuge areas to decrease resistance.

In 2009, a novel solution to the resistance problem was trialed in Arizona, when sterile male pink bollworms (Pectinophora gossypiella) were released into populations of their wild Bt-resistant counterparts. The hypothesis was that sterile males mating with the few surviving females, who had developed resistance, would lead to a decrease in pests in the following generation. There was a dramatic reduction in pink bollworms, with only two pink bollworm larvae being found by the third year of the study.

== Controversies ==
The link between the introduction of Bt cotton in India and a surge in farmer suicides has been refuted by other studies, with decreased farmer suicides since Bt cotton was introduced. Bt cotton accounts for 93% of cotton grown in India.

== By country ==
=== In India ===
In 2001, prior to the approval of Monsanto/Mahyco Bt cotton, Navbaharat Seeds sold illegal and unapproved Bt cotton, which was grown on 11,000 hectares in Gujarat.

The use of Bt cotton in India was approved in 2002 but adoption did not spread until 2005-2008. Eight years after the deployment of Bt cotton, India became the number one exporter of cotton globally and the second largest cotton producer in the world. India now has many dozen brands of Bt cotton.

Socio-economic surveys from the first few years of Bt cotton cultivation tended to indicate significant agronomic, economic, environmental and welfare benefits to Indian farmers.

The state of Maharashtra banned the sale and distribution of Bt cotton in 2012, to promote local Indian seeds, which demand less water, fertilizers and pesticide input, but lifted the ban in 2013.

Punjab Agricultural University (PAU) has successfully developed the country's first Bt cotton varieties. ICAR has identified three varieties, namely PAU Bt 1, F1861 and RS 2013, for cultivation in Punjab, Haryana, Rajasthan. It is a cheaper alternative to Bt cotton hybrid seed.

=== In the US ===
In Hawaii, growing GMO cotton has been prohibited since 2013. Hybridization with the wild cotton species Gossypium tomentosum may be possible. Transgenic cotton is also banned in some parts of Florida.

=== In Africa ===
==== Burkina Faso ====
Burkina Faso, Africa's top cotton producer, banned GM cotton in 2016, because of economic and quality concerns.

==== Kenya ====
Bt cotton is legal in Kenya having been conditionally approved by the National Biosafety Authority in 2016, conditional on the approval of the National Environment Management Authority of Kenya. The Kenyan government is promoting its use, expecting greatly increased output and some greater filling of its own domestic demand.

== See also ==
- Bt brinjal
- Genetically modified food controversies
