= Genetically modified food =

Foods produced from organisms that have had changes introduced into their DNA

Genetically modified foods (GM foods), also known as genetically engineered foods (GE foods), or bioengineered foods are foods produced from organisms that have had changes introduced into their DNA using various methods of genetic engineering. Genetic engineering techniques allow for the introduction of new traits as well as greater control (molecular-level insertion with greater predictability and speed) over traits when compared to previous methods, such as selective breeding and mutation breeding.

The discovery of DNA and the improvement of genetic technology in the 20th century played a crucial role in the development of transgenic technology. In 1988, genetically modified microbial enzymes were first approved for use in food manufacture. Recombinant rennet was used in several countries in the 1990s. Commercial sale of genetically modified foods began in 1994, when Calgene first marketed its later-withdrawn Flavr Savr delayed-ripening tomato. Most food modifications have primarily focused on cash crops in high demand by farmers such as soybean, maize/corn, canola, and cotton. Genetically modified crops have been engineered for resistance to pathogens and herbicides and for better nutrient profiles. The production of golden rice in 2000 represented the first genetically modified crop developed primarily to enhance nutritional value. GM livestock have been developed, although, as of 2015, none were on the market. As of 2015, the AquAdvantage salmon was the only animal approved for commercial production, sale and consumption by the FDA. It is the first genetically modified animal to be approved for human consumption.

Genes encoded for desired features, for instance an improved nutrient level, pesticide and herbicide resistances, and the possession of therapeutic substances, are often extracted and transferred to the target organisms, providing them with enhanced survival and production capacity. These modifications can provide consumer benefits in specific aspects such as taste, appearance, or shelf life.

There is a scientific consensus that currently available food derived from GM crops poses no greater risk to human health than conventional food, but that each GM food needs to be tested on a case-by-case basis before introduction. Nonetheless, members of the public are much less likely than scientists to perceive GM foods as safe. The legal and regulatory status of GM foods varies by country, with some nations banning or restricting them, and others permitting them with widely differing degrees of regulation, which varied due to geographical, religious, social, and other factors.

== Definition ==
Genetically modified foods are foods produced from organisms that have had changes introduced into their DNA using the methods of genetic engineering as opposed to traditional cross breeding. In the U.S., the Department of Agriculture (USDA) and the Food and Drug Administration (FDA) favor the use of the term genetic engineering over genetic modification as being more precise; the USDA defines genetic modification to include "genetic engineering or other more traditional methods".

According to the World Health Organization, "Foods produced from or using GM organisms are often referred to as GM foods."

What constitutes a genetically modified organism (GMO) is not clear and varies widely between countries, international bodies and other communities, has changed significantly over time, and was subject to numerous exceptions based on "convention", such as exclusion of mutation breeding from the EU definition.

'Non-GMO' or 'GMO-free' labeling schemes in food marketing exhibit significant inconsistency. Products such as water or salt, which contain no genetic material and thus cannot be genetically modified, are sometimes labeled to create an impression of superior health benefits.

== History ==
Human-directed genetic manipulation of food began with the domestication of plants and animals through artificial selection at about 10,500 to 10,100 BC. The process of selective breeding, in which organisms with desired traits (and thus with the desired genes) are used to breed the next generation and organisms lacking the trait are not bred, is a precursor to the modern concept of genetic modification (GM). With the discovery of DNA in the early 1900s and various advancements in genetic techniques through the 1970s it became possible to directly alter the DNA and genes within food.

Genetically modified microbial enzymes were the first application of genetically modified organisms in food production and were approved in 1988 by the US Food and Drug Administration. In the early 1990s, recombinant chymosin was approved for use in several countries. Cheese had typically been made using the enzyme complex rennet that had been extracted from cows' stomach lining. Scientists modified bacteria to produce chymosin, which was also able to clot milk, resulting in cheese curds.

The first genetically modified food approved for release was the Flavr Savr tomato in 1994. Developed by Calgene, it was engineered to have a longer shelf life by inserting an antisense gene that delayed ripening. China was the first country to commercialize a transgenic crop in 1993 with the introduction of virus-resistant tobacco. In 1995, Bacillus thuringiensis (Bt) Potato was approved for cultivation, making it the first pesticide producing crop to be approved in the US. Other genetically modified crops receiving marketing approval in 1995 were: canola with modified oil composition, Bt maize/corn, cotton resistant to the herbicide bromoxynil, Bt cotton, glyphosate-tolerant soybeans, virus-resistant squash, and another delayed ripening tomato.

With the creation of golden rice in 2000, scientists had genetically modified food to increase its nutrient value for the first time.

By 2010, 29 countries had planted commercialized biotech crops and a further 31 countries had granted regulatory approval for transgenic crops to be imported. The US was the leading country in the production of GM foods in 2011, with twenty-five GM crops having received regulatory approval. In 2015, 92% of corn, 94% of soybeans, and 94% of cotton produced in the US were genetically modified varieties.

The first genetically modified animal to be approved for food use was AquAdvantage salmon in 2015. The salmon were transformed with a growth hormone-regulating gene from a Pacific Chinook salmon and a promoter from an ocean pout enabling it to grow year-round instead of only during spring and summer.

A GM white button mushroom (Agaricus bisporus) has been approved in the United States since 2016. See §Mushroom below.

The most widely planted GMOs are designed to tolerate herbicides. The use of herbicides presents a strong selection pressure on treated weeds to gain resistance to the herbicide. Widespread planting of GM crops resistant to glyphosate has led to the use of glyphosate to control weeds and many weed species, such as Palmer amaranth, acquiring resistance to the herbicide.

In 2021, the first CRISPR-edited food has gone on public sale in Japan. Tomatoes were genetically modified for around five times the normal amount of possibly calming GABA. CRISPR was first applied in tomatoes in 2014. Shortly afterwards, the first CRISPR-gene-edited marine animal/seafood and second set of CRISPR-edited food has gone on public sale in Japan: two fish of which one species grows to twice the size of natural specimens due to disruption of leptin, which controls appetite, and the other grows to 1.2 the natural average size with the same amount of food due to disabled myostatin, which inhibits muscle growth.

== Process ==
Creating genetically modified food is a multi-step process. The first step is to identify a useful gene from another organism that you would like to add. The gene can be taken from a cell or artificially synthesised, and then combined with other genetic elements, including a promoter and terminator region and a selectable marker. Then the genetic elements are inserted into the target's genome. DNA is generally inserted into animal cells using microinjection, where it can be injected through the cell's nuclear envelope directly into the nucleus, or through the use of viral vectors. In plants the DNA is often inserted using Agrobacterium-mediated recombination, biolistics or electroporation. As only a single cell is transformed with genetic material, the organism must be regenerated from that single cell. In plants this is accomplished through tissue culture. In animals it is necessary to ensure that the inserted DNA is present in the embryonic stem cells. Further testing using PCR, Southern hybridization, and DNA sequencing is conducted to confirm that an organism contains the new gene.

Traditionally the new genetic material was inserted randomly within the host genome. Gene targeting techniques, which creates double-stranded breaks and takes advantage on the cells natural homologous recombination repair systems, have been developed to target insertion to exact locations. Genome editing uses artificially engineered nucleases that create breaks at specific points. There are four families of engineered nucleases: meganucleases, zinc finger nucleases, transcription activator-like effector nucleases (TALENs), and the Cas9-guideRNA system (adapted from CRISPR). TALEN and CRISPR are the two most commonly used and each has its own advantages. TALENs have greater target specificity, while CRISPR is easier to design and more efficient.

== By organism ==
=== Crops ===
Genetically modified crops (GM crops) are genetically modified plants that are used in agriculture. The first crops developed were used for animal or human food and provide resistance to certain pests, diseases, environmental conditions, spoilage or chemical treatments (e.g. resistance to a herbicide). The second generation of crops aimed to improve the quality, often by altering the nutrient profile. Third generation genetically modified crops could be used for non-food purposes, including the production of pharmaceutical agents, biofuels, and other industrially useful goods, as well as for bioremediation. GM crops have been produced to improve harvests through reducing insect pressure, increase nutrient value and tolerate different abiotic stresses. As of 2018, the commercialised crops are limited mostly to cash crops like cotton, soybean, maize/corn and canola and the vast majority of the introduced traits provide either herbicide tolerance or insect resistance.

The majority of GM crops have been modified to be resistant to selected herbicides, usually a glyphosate or glufosinate based one. Genetically modified crops engineered to resist herbicides are now more available than conventionally bred resistant varieties. Most currently available genes used to engineer insect resistance come from the Bacillus thuringiensis (Bt) bacterium and code for delta endotoxins. A few use the genes that encode for vegetative insecticidal proteins. The only gene commercially used to provide insect protection that does not originate from B. thuringiensis is the Cowpea trypsin inhibitor (CpTI). CpTI was first approved for use in cotton in 1999 and is currently undergoing trials in rice. Less than one percent of GM crops contained other traits, which include providing virus resistance, delaying senescence and altering the plants composition.

Adoption by farmers has been rapid, between 1996 and 2013, the total surface area of land cultivated with GM crops increased by a factor of 100. Geographically though the spread has been uneven, with strong growth in the Americas and parts of Asia and little in Europe and Africa in 2013 only 10% of world cropland was GM, with the US, Canada, Brazil, and Argentina being 90% of that. Its socioeconomic spread has been more even, with approximately 54% of worldwide GM crops grown in developing countries in 2013. Although doubts have been raised, most studies have found growing GM crops to be beneficial to farmers through decreased pesticide use as well as increased crop yield and farm profit.

=== Fruits and vegetables ===
Sweet potato domestication, which began approximately 8,000–10,000 years ago, involved the incorporation of Agrobacterium tumefaciens DNA into the crop's genome through horizontal gene transfer. Research by Kyndt et al. (2015) identified sequences of Agrobacterium tumefaciens DNA persisting in modern sweet potato genomes; while this natural transgenic event demonstrates that horizontal gene transfer has long affected crop genetics, the specific traits enhanced by this transfer remain incompletely characterized.

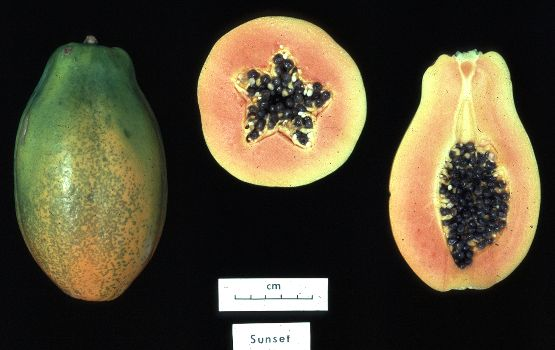
Three views of a papaya, cultivar "Sunset", which was genetically modified to create the cultivar 'SunUp', which is resistant to Papaya ringspot virus

Papaya was genetically modified to resist the ringspot virus (PSRV). "SunUp" is a transgenic red-fleshed Sunset papaya cultivar that is homozygous for the coat protein gene PRSV; "Rainbow" is a yellow-fleshed F1 hybrid developed by crossing 'SunUp' and nontransgenic yellow-fleshed "Kapoho". The GM cultivar was approved in 1998 and by 2010 80% of Hawaiian papaya was genetically engineered. The New York Times stated, "without it, the state's papaya industry would have collapsed". In China, a transgenic PRSV-resistant papaya was developed by South China Agricultural University and was first approved for commercial planting in 2006; as of 2012 95% of the papaya grown in Guangdong province and 40% of the papaya grown in Hainan province was genetically modified. In Hong Kong, where there is an exemption on growing and releasing any varieties of GM papaya, more than 80% of grown and imported papayas were transgenic.

The New Leaf potato, a GM food developed using Bacillus thuringiensis (Bt), was made to provide in-plant protection from the yield-robbing Colorado potato beetle. The New Leaf potato, brought to market by Monsanto in the late 1990s, was developed for the fast food market. It was withdrawn in 2001 after retailers rejected it and food processors ran into export problems. In 2011, BASF requested the European Food Safety Authority's approval for cultivation and marketing of its Fortuna potato as feed and food. The potato was made resistant to late blight by adding resistant genes blb1 and blb2 that originate from the Mexican wild potato Solanum bulbocastanum. In February 2013, BASF withdrew its application. In 2014, the USDA approved a genetically modified potato developed by J. R. Simplot Company that contained ten genetic modifications that prevent bruising and produce less acrylamide when fried. The modifications eliminate specific proteins from the potatoes, via RNA interference, rather than introducing novel proteins.

As of 2005, about 13% of the Zucchini grown in the US was genetically modified to resist three viruses; that variety is also grown in Canada.

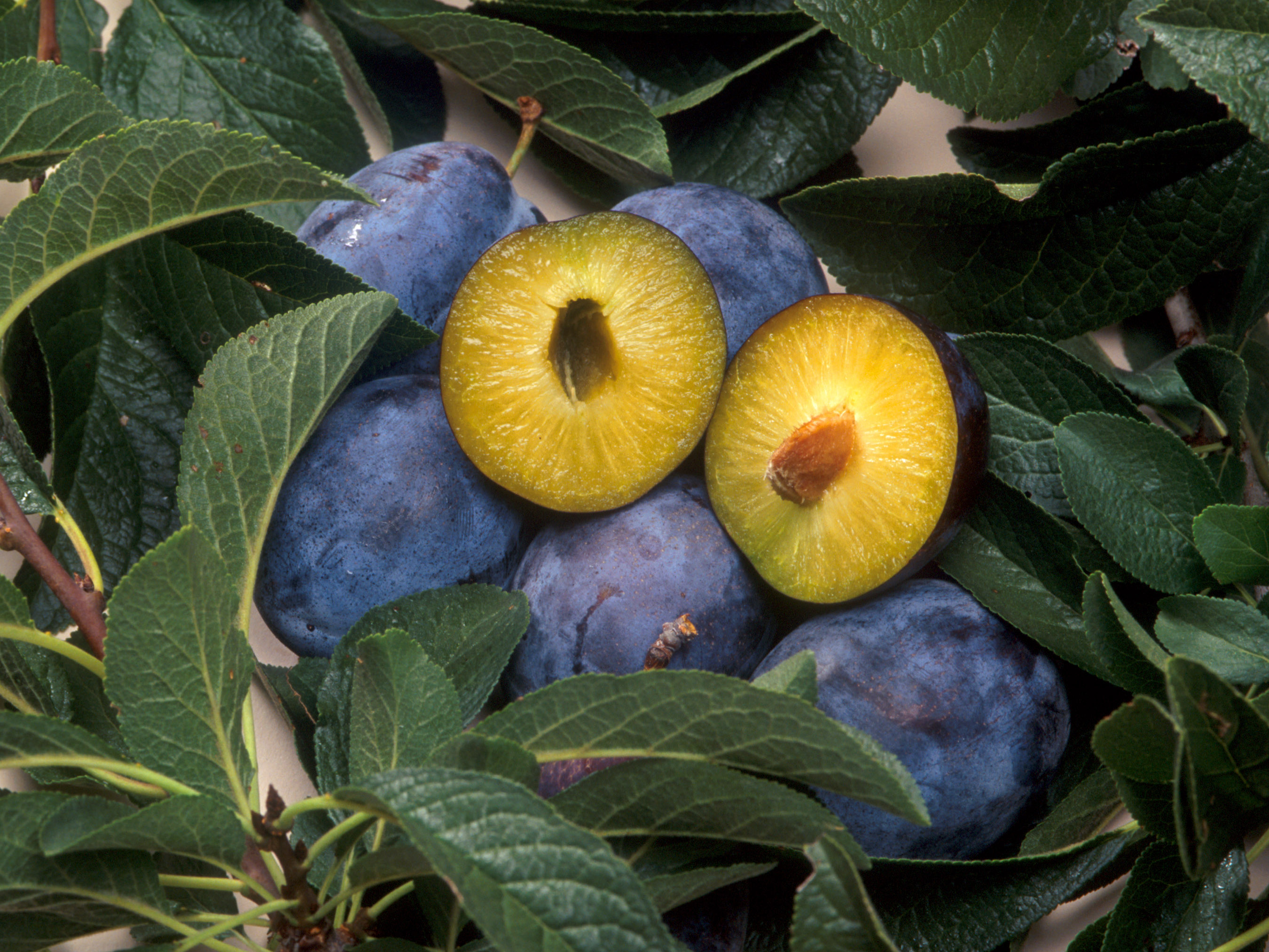
Plums genetically engineered for resistance to plum pox, a disease carried by aphids

In 2013, the USDA approved the import of a GM pineapple that is pink in color and that "overexpresses" a gene derived from tangerines and suppress other genes, increasing production of lycopene. The plant's flowering cycle was changed to provide for more uniform growth and quality. The fruit "does not have the ability to propagate and persist in the environment once they have been harvested", according to USDA APHIS. According to Del Monte's submission, the pineapples are commercially grown in a "monoculture" that prevents seed production, as the plant's flowers aren't exposed to compatible pollen sources. Importation into Hawaii is banned for "plant sanitation" reasons. The US FDA approved sales of the pineapples in December 2016, and Del Monte launched sales of their pink pineapples in October 2020, marketed under the name "Pinkglow".

In February 2015 Arctic Apples were approved by the USDA, becoming the first genetically modified apple approved for sale in the US. Gene silencing is used to reduce the expression of polyphenol oxidase (PPO), thus preventing the fruit from browning.

=== Tomatoes ===
Following the withdrawal of the Flavr Savr tomato from the market in 1999, genetically modified tomatoes were not sold in the United States for decades.

In February 2024, the Purple Tomato, created by the UK-based Norfolk Plant Sciences, was launched to the public. It is distinguished by its striking purple color, which comes from the antioxidant anthocyanin. Proponents suggest these tomatoes could provide health benefits due to their elevated antioxidant content. Cathie Martin, who developed these tomatoes, reported in a study that mice fed these tomatoes lived 30% longer than control mice.

Also in development in the UK are tomatoes enhanced with Vitamin D. This tomato has increased provitamin D3 that when exposed to UVB light, converts to Vitamin D3.

=== Maize/corn ===
Maize/corn used for food and ethanol has been genetically modified to tolerate various herbicides and to express a protein from Bacillus thuringiensis (Bt) that kills certain insects. About 90% of the corn grown in the US was genetically modified in 2010. In the US in 2015, 81% of corn acreage contained the Bt trait and 89% of corn acreage contained the glyphosate-tolerant trait. Corn can be processed into grits, meal and flour as an ingredient in pancakes, muffins, doughnuts, breadings and batters, as well as baby foods, meat products, cereals and some fermented products. Corn-based masa flour and masa dough are used in the production of taco shells, corn chips and tortillas.

=== Soy ===
Soybeans accounted for half of all genetically modified crops planted in 2014. Genetically modified soybean has been modified to tolerate herbicides and produce healthier oils. In 2015, 94% of soybean acreage in the U.S. was genetically modified to be glyphosate-tolerant.

=== Rice ===
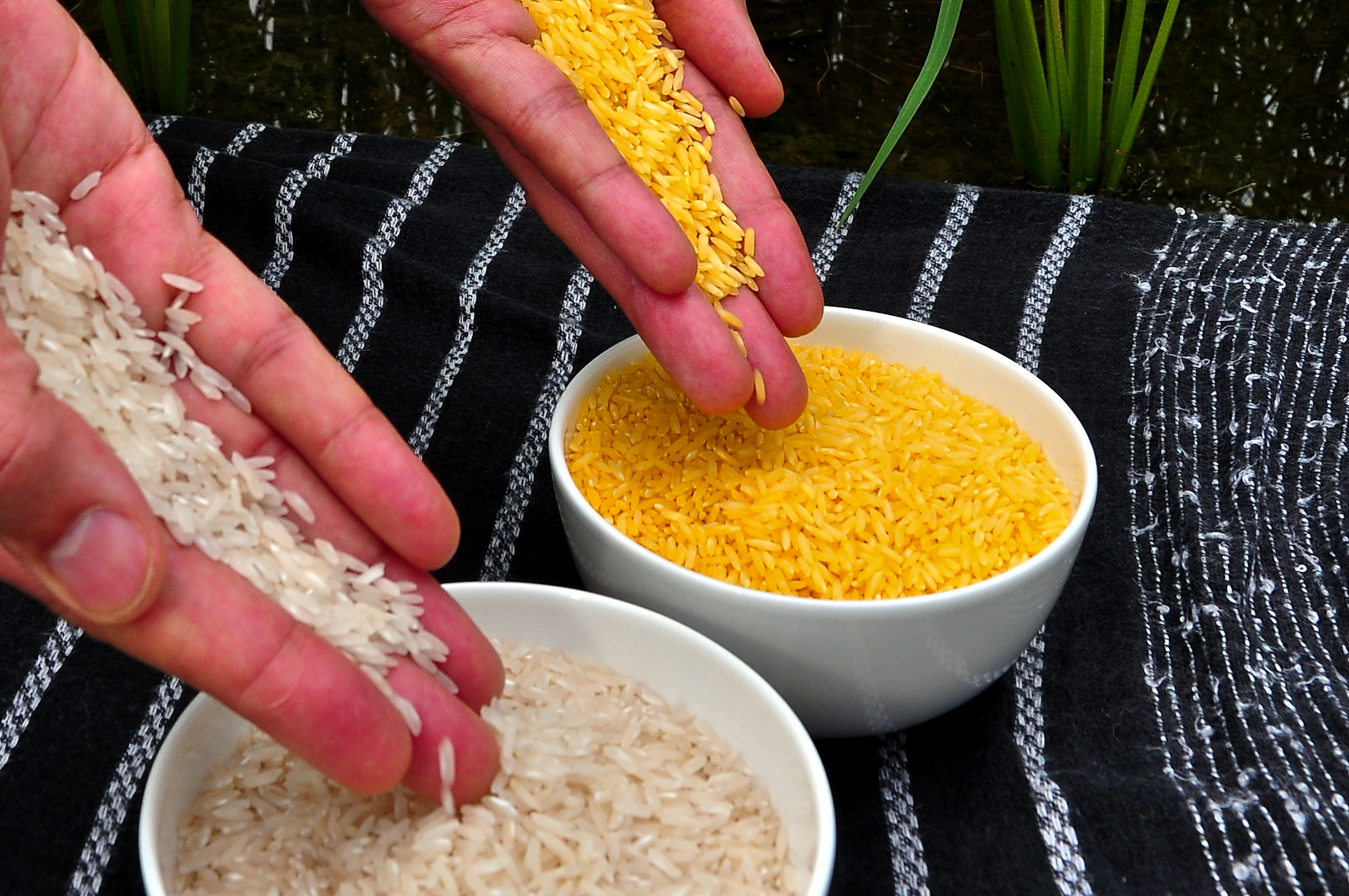
Golden rice is genetically modified for an increased nutrient level, which has a different color and vitamin A content.

Golden rice is the most well known GM crop that is aimed at increasing nutrient value. It has been engineered with three genes that biosynthesise beta-carotene, a precursor of vitamin A, in the edible parts of rice. It is intended to produce a fortified food to be grown and consumed in areas with a shortage of dietary vitamin A, a deficiency which each year is estimated to kill 670,000 children under the age of 5 and cause an additional 500,000 cases of irreversible childhood blindness. The original golden rice produced 1.6 μg/g of the carotenoids, with further development increasing this 23 times. In 2018 it gained its first approvals for use as food.

=== Wheat ===
As of December 2017, genetically modified wheat has been evaluated in field trials, but has not been released commercially.

=== Alfalfa ===
Alfalfa, a flowering plant in the legume family, has also been genetically modified. GMO alfalfa is typically used to feed dairy cattle. One particular genetic modification that has been made involves increased resistance to pesticides and herbicides. This modification allows farmers to spray surrounding areas for weeds without harming the alfalfa crops. If left unchecked, these destructive weeds can reduce the nutritional value of alfalfa.

=== Mushroom ===
In April 2016, the USDA determined that a white button mushroom (Agaricus bisporus) modified using CRISPR-Cas9 gene editing was exempt from regulatory review. Because the editing process deleted DNA sequences (rather than introducing foreign genetic material), the USDA classified the edited mushroom outside its regulatory authority under the Plant Protection Act. This exemption effectively permitted commercialization of the mushroom without formal pre-market safety assessment.

=== Livestock ===
Genetically modified livestock are organisms from the group of cattle, sheep, pigs, goats, birds, horses and fish kept for human consumption, whose genetic material (DNA) has been altered using genetic engineering techniques. In some cases, the aim is to introduce a new trait to the animals which does not occur naturally in the species, i.e. transgenesis.

A 2003 review published on behalf of Food Standards Australia New Zealand examined transgenic experimentation on terrestrial livestock species as well as aquatic species such as fish and shellfish. The review examined the molecular techniques used for experimentation as well as techniques for tracing the transgenes in animals and products as well as issues regarding transgene stability.

Some mammals typically used for food production have been modified to produce non-food products, a practice sometimes called Pharming.

==== Cows ====
Transgenic cows, or cows that have had foreign DNA artificially inserted into their genome, were introduced in 2000 by AgResearch scientists. The specific modification made was to provide these genetically altered cows with proteins in their milk to help treat human diseases.

=== Salmon ===
A GM salmon, awaiting regulatory approval since 1997, was approved for human consumption by the American FDA in November 2015, to be raised in specific land-based hatcheries in Canada and Panama. This salmon, called the AquAdvantage salmon, was designed to reach stages in growth sooner than non-GMO salmon. However, the producer of this salmon, AquaBounty Technologies, closed their salmon facilities in December 2024 due to loss of funds.

=== Microbes ===
Bacteriophages are an economically significant cause of culture failure in cheese production. Various culture microbes - especially Lactococcus lactis and Streptococcus thermophilus - have been studied for genetic analysis and modification to improve phage resistance. This has especially focused on plasmid and recombinant chromosomal modifications.

Genetically modified microbes are also being utilized for farming and soil health. Proven, a genetically edited product created by the biotechnology company Pivot Bio, uses nitrogen-fixing microbes instead of synthetic nitrogen in soil for crops such as corn.

== Derivative products ==
=== Lecithin ===
Lecithin is a naturally occurring lipid. It can be found in egg yolks and oil-producing plants. It is an emulsifier and thus is used in many foods. Corn, soy and safflower oil are sources of lecithin, though the majority of lecithin commercially available is derived from soy. Sufficiently processed lecithin is often undetectable with standard testing practices. According to the FDA, no evidence shows or suggests hazard to the public when lecithin is used at common levels. Lecithin added to foods amounts to only 2 to 10 percent of the 1 to 5 g of phosphoglycerides consumed daily on average. Nonetheless, consumer concerns about GM food extend to such products. This concern led to policy and regulatory changes in Europe in 2000, when Regulation (EC) 50/2000 was passed which required labelling of food containing additives derived from GMOs, including lecithin. Because of the difficulty of detecting the origin of derivatives like lecithin with current testing practices, European regulations require those who wish to sell lecithin in Europe to employ a comprehensive system of Identity preservation (IP).

=== Sugar ===
The US imports 10% of its sugar, while the remaining 90% is extracted from sugar beet and sugarcane. After deregulation in 2005, glyphosate-resistant sugar beet was extensively adopted in the United States. 95% of beet acres in the US were planted with glyphosate-resistant seed in 2011. GM sugar beets are approved for cultivation in the US, Canada and Japan; the vast majority are grown in the US. GM beets are approved for import and consumption in Australia, Canada, Colombia, EU, Japan, Korea, Mexico, New Zealand, Philippines, the Russian Federation and Singapore. Pulp from the refining process is used as animal feed. The sugar produced from GM sugar beets contains no DNA or protein – it is just sucrose that is chemically indistinguishable from sugar produced from non-GM sugar beets. Independent analyses conducted by internationally recognized laboratories found that sugar from Roundup Ready sugar beets is identical to the sugar from comparably grown conventional (non-Roundup Ready) sugar beets.

In 2017, Brazil became the first country to approve the commercial cultivation of genetically modified insect-resistant sugarcane. Some other countries also allow the import of refined sugar derived from these genetically modified crops, as the refined product is considered indistinguishable from conventional sugar.

=== Vegetable oil ===
Most vegetable oil used in the US is produced from GM crops canola, maize/corn, cotton and soybeans. Vegetable oil is sold directly to consumers as cooking oil, shortening and margarine and is used in prepared foods. There is a vanishingly small amount of protein or DNA from the original crop in vegetable oil. Vegetable oil is made of triglycerides extracted from plants or seeds and then refined and may be further processed via hydrogenation to turn liquid oils into solids. The refining process removes all, or nearly all non-triglyceride ingredients.

=== High-fructose corn syrup ===
High-fructose corn syrup (HFCS) was first developed in 1957 by researchers in the US. It is produced from corn that is initially ground to make corn starch, which is subsequently refined to produce corn syrup. Enzymes are added to transform the sugars in corn syrup into sweet fructose. The alpha-amylase and glucoamylase employed in high fructose corn syrup production have been genetically altered to enhance their heat stability for HFCS manufacturing. The US food sector, especially large soft drink corporations, started using HFCS extensively as a sweetener because of elevated sugar prices and cheaper corn costs.

== Other uses ==
=== Animal feed ===
Livestock and poultry are raised on animal feed, much of which is composed of the leftovers from processing crops, including GM crops. For example, approximately 43% of a canola seed is oil. What remains after oil extraction is a meal that becomes an ingredient in animal feed and contains canola protein. Likewise, the bulk of the soybean crop is grown for oil and meal. The high-protein defatted and toasted soy meal becomes livestock feed and dog food. 98% of the US soybean crop goes for livestock feed. In 2011, 49% of the US maize/corn harvest was used for livestock feed (including the percentage of waste from distillers grains). "Despite methods that are becoming more and more sensitive, tests have not yet been able to establish a difference in the meat, milk, or eggs of animals depending on the type of feed they are fed. It is impossible to tell if an animal was fed GM soy just by looking at the resulting meat, dairy, or egg products. The only way to verify the presence of GMOs in animal feed is to analyze the origin of the feed itself."

Enzymes produced by genetically modified microorganisms are also integrated into animal feed to enhance availability of nutrients and overall digestion. These enzymes may also provide benefit to the gut microbiome of an animal, as well as hydrolyse antinutritional factors present in the feed.

=== Proteins ===
The foundation of genetic engineering is DNA, which directs the production of proteins. Proteins are also the common source of human allergens. When new proteins are introduced they must be assessed for potential allergenicity.

Rennet is a mixture of enzymes used to coagulate milk into cheese. Originally it was available only from the fourth stomach of calves, and was scarce and expensive, or was available from microbial sources, which often produced unpleasant tastes. Genetic engineering made it possible to extract rennet-producing genes from animal stomachs and insert them into bacteria, fungi or yeasts to make them produce chymosin, the key enzyme. The modified microorganism is killed after fermentation. Chymosin is isolated from the fermentation broth, so that the Fermentation-Produced Chymosin (FPC) used by cheese producers has an amino acid sequence that is identical to bovine rennet. The majority of the applied chymosin is retained in the whey. Trace quantities of chymosin may remain in cheese.

FPC was the first artificially produced enzyme to be approved by the US Food and Drug Administration. FPC products have been on the market since 1990 and as of 2015 had yet to be surpassed in commercial markets. In 1999, about 60% of US hard cheese was made with FPC. Its global market share approached 80%. By 2008, approximately 80% to 90% of commercially made cheeses in the US and Britain were made using FPC.

In some countries, recombinant (GM) bovine somatotropin (also called rBST, or bovine growth hormone or BGH) is approved for administration to increase milk production. rBST may be present in milk from rBST treated cows, but it is destroyed in the digestive system and even if directly injected into the human bloodstream, has no observable effect on humans. The FDA, World Health Organization, American Medical Association, American Dietetic Association and the National Institutes of Health have independently stated that dairy products and meat from rBST-treated cows are safe for human consumption. On 30 September 2010, the United States Court of Appeals, Sixth Circuit, analyzing submitted evidence, found a "compositional difference" between milk from rBGH-treated cows and milk from untreated cows. The court stated that milk from rBGH-treated cows has: increased levels of the hormone Insulin-like growth factor 1 (IGF-1); higher fat content and lower protein content when produced at certain points in the cow's lactation cycle; and more somatic cell counts, which may "make the milk turn sour more quickly".

=== Cotton ===
The National Library of Medicine states that many lines of GM cotton have been created using a gene from Bacillus thuringiensis subspecies. This genetic modification provides protection against lepidopteran pests. This GM allowed the macronutrients and gossypol to remain similar to non-GM parental lineages, with cyclopropenoid fatty acids and aflatoxin levels less than the parental non-GM seeds.

== Benefits ==
Genetically modified foods are typically engineered to achieve specific characteristics that provide agronomic or nutritional benefits, including: tolerance to extreme environmental conditions (drought, saline soil, flooding); enhanced nutritional profiles (increased vitamins, minerals, or amino acids); production of therapeutic substances (vaccines); reduced carcinogen exposure (through decreased mycotoxin or pesticide residue contamination); and resistance to agricultural pests and herbicides.

=== Prepare for extreme weather ===
Some genetically modified plants have been engineered to tolerate extreme weather conditions. Genetically modified (GM) food crops can be cultivated in locations with unfavorable climatic conditions on occasion. The quality and yield of genetically modified foods are often improved. These foods tend to grow more quickly than conventionally cultivated ones. Furthermore, the application of genetically modified food could be beneficial in resisting drought and poor soil.

=== Nutritional enhancement ===
Increased levels of specific nutrients in food crops can be achieved by genetic engineering. The study of this technique, sometimes known as nutritional improvement, is well-advanced. Foods are monitored to gain specific qualities that became practical, such as added nutrients, making them a desirable component of diets. Among the notable breakthroughs of genetic modification is golden rice, whose genome is altered by the injection of the vitamin A gene from a daffodil plant conditioning provitamin A production. This increases the activity of phytoene synthase, which therefore synthesizes a higher amount of beta-carotene, followed by modification and improvement of the level of iron and bioavailability. This affects the rice's color and vitamin content, which is beneficial in places where vitamin A shortage is common. In addition, increased mineral, vitamin A, and protein content has played a critical role in preventing childhood blindness and iron deficiency anemia.

Lipid composition could also be manipulated to produce desirable traits and essential nutrients. Scientific evidence has shown that inadequate consumption of omega-3 polyunsaturated fatty acids is generally associated with the development of chronic diseases and developmental aberrations. Alimentary lipids can be modified to gain an increased saturated fatty acid together with a decreased polyunsaturated fatty acid component. Genes coded for the synthesis of unsaturated fatty acids are therefore introduced into plant cells, increasing the synthesis of polyunsaturated omega-3 acids. This omega-3 polyunsaturated fatty acid is responsible to lower the level of LDL cholesterol and triglyceride level as well as the incidence rate of cardiovascular diseases.

=== Production of therapeutic substances ===
The genetically modified organisms, including potato, tomato, and spinach are applied in the production of substances that stimulate the immune system to respond to specific pathogens. With the help of recombinant DNA techniques, the genes encoded for viral or bacterial antigens could be genetically transcribed and translated into plant cells. Antibodies are often produced in response to the introduction of antigens, in which the pathological microflora obtains the immune response towards specific antigens. The transgenic organisms are usually applied to use as oral vaccines, which allows the active substances to enter the human digestive system, targeting the alimentary tract in which stimulate a mucosal immune response. This technique has been widely used in vaccine production including rice, maize, and soybeans. Additionally, transgenic plants are widely used as bioreactors in the production of pharmaceutical proteins and peptides, including vaccines, hormones, and human serum albumin. The suitability of transgenic plants can helps meet the demand for the rapid growth of therapeutic antibodies. These developments have contributed to advances in pharmaceutical production.

== Health and safety ==
There is a scientific consensus that currently available food derived from GM crops poses no greater risk to human health than conventional food, but that each GM food needs to be tested on a case-by-case basis before introduction. Nonetheless, members of the public are much less likely than scientists to perceive GM foods as safe. The legal and regulatory status of GM foods varies by country, with some nations banning or restricting them, and others permitting them with widely differing degrees of regulation.

Opponents claim that long-term health risks have not been adequately assessed and propose various combinations of additional testing, labeling or removal from the market. Despite these concerns, long-term studies in humans are limited by ethical and practical constraints. However, studies in non-human animals, particularly in livestock, have not identified adverse health effects following the continuous use of transgenic feed. A 2012 literature review of studies evaluating the effect of GM feed on the health of animals did not find evidence that animals were adversely affected, although small biological differences were occasionally found. The studies included in the review ranged from 90 days to two years, with several of the longer studies considering reproductive and intergenerational effects. One study analyzing the gut microbiota and metabolite profiles in two generations of cynomolgus monkeys that were fed GM corn found no significant differences in most biological indicators, and the small variations observed did not affect physiological functions during the feeding period. Moreover, available epidemiological data do not demonstrate associations between the consumption of genetically modified foods and the emergence of diseases or chronic conditions. To date, no harmful effects on human health have been proven following the introduction of genetically modified foods.

Some studies purporting to show harm have been discredited, in some cases leading to academic condemnation against the researchers such as the Pusztai affair and the Séralini affair.

There are no certifications for foods that have been verified to be both genetically modified – in particular in a way that is ensured to be well-understood, safe and environmentally friendly – and otherwise organic (i.e. produced without the use of chemical pesticides) in the U.S. and possibly the world, giving consumers the binary choice of either genetically modified food or organic food.

=== Testing ===
The legal and regulatory status of GM foods varies by country, with some nations banning or restricting them, and others permitting them with widely differing degrees of regulation.

Governments manage the marketing and release of GM foods on a case-by-case basis. Countries differ in their risk assessments and regulations. Marked differences distinguish the US from Europe. Crops not intended as foods are generally not reviewed for food safety. GM foods are not tested in humans before marketing because they are not a single chemical, nor are they intended to be ingested using specific doses and intervals, which complicate clinical study design. Regulators examine the genetic modification, related protein products and any changes that those proteins make to the food.

Regulators verify whether genetically modified foods are "substantially equivalent" to their conventional counterparts in order to detect any unintended negative consequences. To determine this equivalence, the manufacturer conducts tests designed to identify possible unexpected changes in specific components—such as toxins, nutrients, or allergens—and usually also evaluates the effects of processing and transformation of the raw food, comparing the genetically modified product with its unmodified conventional counterpart. These data are then analyzed by a regulatory agency. If regulators conclude that there are no significant differences between the modified and conventional products, additional food safety testing is generally not required. However, if the product has no natural equivalent, presents relevant differences compared to the unmodified food, or involves other risk factors—for example, the expression of a protein that did not previously exist in the composition—supplementary safety tests may be required. New proteins or anomalies detected during substantial equivalence analysis undergo additional toxicological assessments, resulting in a final safety evaluation. Additional tests may also be recommended to assess environmental impacts.

Substantial equivalence is the underlying principle in GM food safety assessment for a number of national and international agencies, including the Canadian Food Inspection Agency (CFIA), Japan's Ministry of Health, Labour and Welfare (MHLW), the US Food and Drug Administration (FDA), and the United Nations' Food and Agriculture Organization (FAO) and World Health Organization. In the U.S. the FDA determined that GMOs are "generally recognized as safe" (GRAS) and therefore do not require additional testing if the GMO product is substantially equivalent to the non-modified product. If new substances are found, further testing may be required to satisfy concerns over potential toxicity, allergenicity, possible gene transfer to humans or genetic outcrossing to other organisms.

Some medical organizations, including the British Medical Association, advocate greater caution in the regulation of GMOs based on the precautionary principle. This principle recommends that, in the face of potential risks or significant scientific uncertainty, preventive measures should be taken or the proposed action should be suspended or re-evaluated, rather than waiting for conclusive proof of harm. In its strict formulation, the principle can only be relaxed when robust evidence has been obtained showing that no harm will result. The precautionary principle was incorporated into the Cartagena Protocol on Biosafety, developed under the Convention on Biological Diversity.

In 1997, the European Union established a novel food evaluation procedure under which, once the producer has confirmed substantial equivalence with an existing food, government notification—accompanied by supporting scientific evidence—is the only requirement for commercial release. However, foods containing genetically modified organisms are excluded from this simplified process and require mandatory authorization. In the EU, the precautionary principle is applied, as the potential risks of GMOs are not yet fully known. Therefore, a rigorous demonstration of safety is required prior to approval, along with prior authorization for commercialization and environmental monitoring after the product enters the market.

== Regulation ==
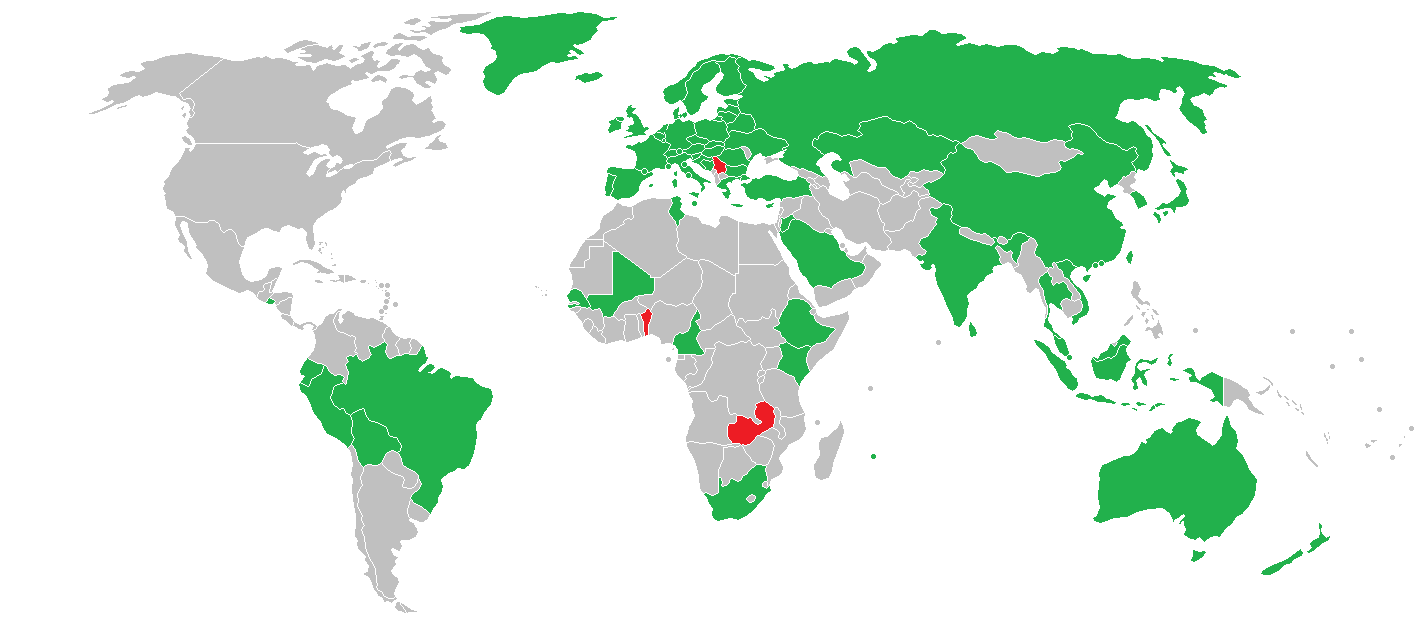
Green: Mandatory labeling required; Red: Ban on import and cultivation of genetically engineered food.

Government regulation of GMO development and release varies widely between countries. Marked differences separate GMO regulation in the U.S. and GMO regulation in the European Union. Regulation also varies depending on the intended product's use. For example, a crop not intended for food use is generally not reviewed by authorities responsible for food safety. European and EU regulation has been far more restrictive than anywhere else in the world: In 2013 only 1 cultivar of maize/corn and 1 cultivar of potato were approved, and eight EU member states did not allow even those.

=== United States regulations ===
In the U.S., three government organizations regulate GMOs. The FDA checks the chemical composition of organisms for potential allergens. The United States Department of Agriculture (USDA) supervises field testing and monitors the distribution of GM seeds. The United States Environmental Protection Agency (EPA) is responsible for monitoring pesticide usage, including plants modified to contain proteins toxic to insects. Like USDA, EPA also oversees field testing and the distribution of crops that have had contact with pesticides to ensure environmental safety. In 2015 the Obama administration announced that it would update the way the government regulated GM crops.

In 1992 FDA published "Statement of Policy: Foods derived from New Plant Varieties". This statement is a clarification of FDA's interpretation of the Food, Drug, and Cosmetic Act with respect to foods produced from new plant varieties developed using recombinant deoxyribonucleic acid (rDNA) technology. FDA encouraged developers to consult with the FDA regarding any bioengineered foods in development. The FDA says developers routinely do reach out for consultations. In 1996 FDA updated consultation procedures. With these updates came the voluntary Plant Biotechnology Consultation Program established through the FDA, which assesses the safety of new GMO products. This program provides a way for developers to meet directly with the FDA to introduce their product to the public.

The StarLink corn recalls occurred in the autumn of 2000, when over 300 food products were found to contain a genetically modified maize/corn that had not been approved for human consumption. It was the first-ever recall of a genetically modified food.

=== European regulations ===
The European Union's control of genetically modified organisms illustrates some of the promises and limitations of debate as a framework for supranational regulation. The issues posed by the EU's GMO regulation have caused major problems in agriculture, politics, societies, status, and other fields. 12 The EU law regulates the development and use of GMOs by allocating responsibilities to different authorities, public and private, accompanied by limited recognition of public information, consultation, and participation rights. The European Convention on Human Rights (ECHR) provided certain rights and protection for GM biotechnology in the EU. However, the value of human dignity, liberty, equality, and solidarity, as well as the status of democracy and law, as emphasized in the European Charter of Fundamental Rights, are considered the ethical framework governing the employment of scientific and technological research and development.

Due to the political, religious, and social differences in EU countries, the EU's position on GM has been divided geographically, including more than 100 "GM-free" regions. Different regional attitudes to GM foods make it nearly impossible to reach a common agreement on GM foods. In recent years, however, the sense of crisis that this has generated for the European Union has intensified. Some member states, including Germany, France, Austria, Italy, and Luxembourg, have even banned the planting of certain GM food in their countries in response to public resistance to GM foods. These regulatory challenges occur amid consumer concerns about the environmental and health effects of GM foods, reflected in various anti-biotech coalitions. The current political deadlock over GM foods is also a consequence of the ban and has yet to be resolved by scientific methods and processes. Public opinion tends to politicize the GM issue, which is the main obstacle to an agreement in the EU.

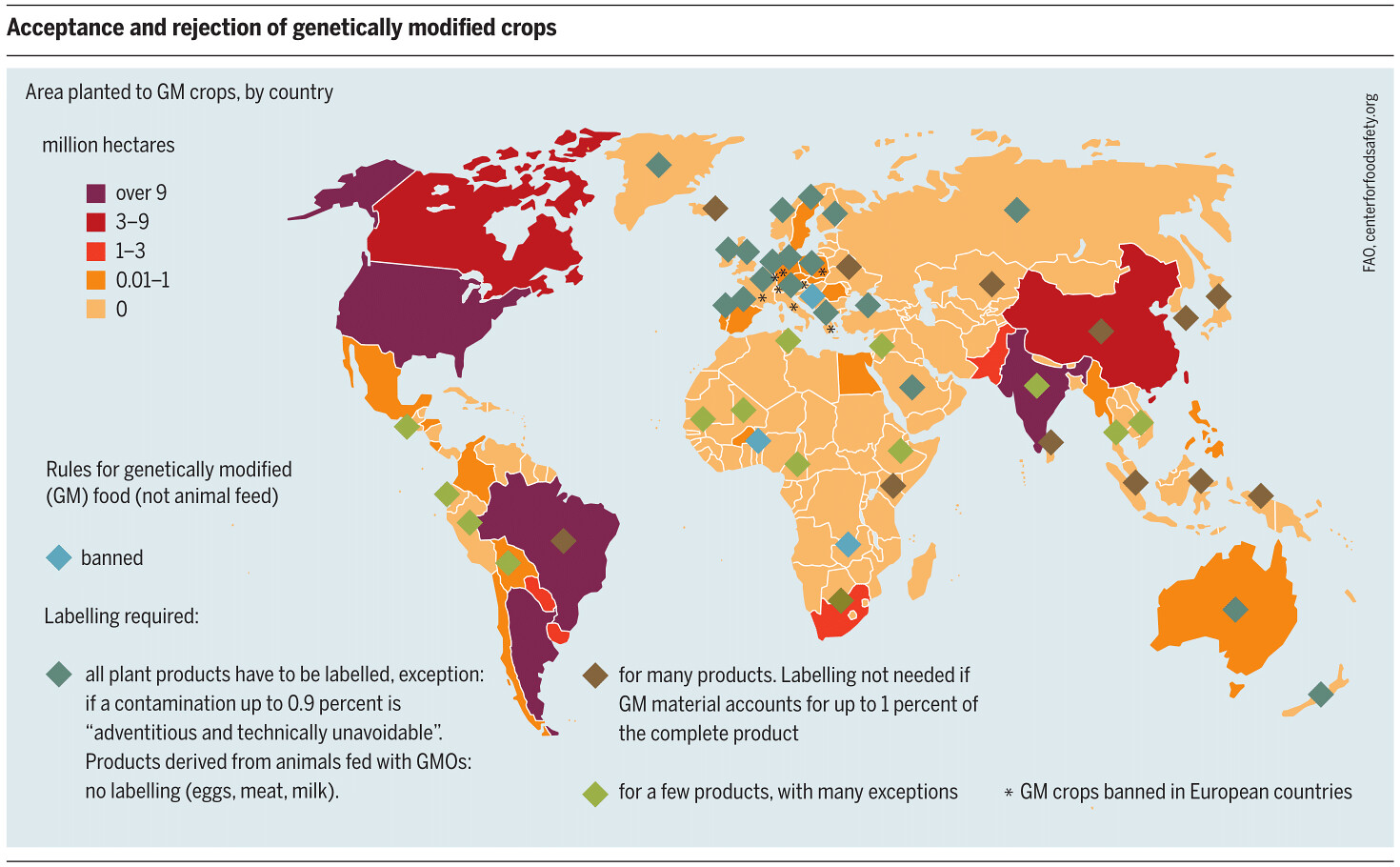
Application of genetically modified food throughout the globe

In the United Kingdom, the Food Standards Agency assesses GM foods for their toxicity, nutritional value, and potential to cause allergic reactions. GM foods can be authorised for sale where they present no risk to health, do not mislead consumers, and have nutritional value at least equivalent to non-modified counterparts. The Genetic Technology (Precision Breeding) Act passed into law on 23 March 2023. The UK government said it would allow farmers to "grow crops which are drought and disease resistant, reduce use of fertilisers and pesticides, and help breed animals that are protected from catching harmful diseases".

=== Labeling ===
As of 2015, 64 countries require labeling of GMO products in the marketplace.

US and Canadian national policy is to require a label only given significant composition differences or documented health impacts, although some individual US states (Vermont, Connecticut and Maine) enacted laws requiring them. In July 2016, Public Law 114-214 was enacted to regulate labeling of GMO food on a national basis.

In some jurisdictions, the labeling requirement depends on the relative quantity of GMO in the product. A study that investigated voluntary labeling in South Africa found that 31% of products labeled as GMO-free had a GM content above 1.0%.

In the European Union all food (including processed food) or feed that contains greater than 0.9% GMOs must be labelled.

At the same time, due to lack of single, clear definition of GMO, a number of foods created using genetic engineering techniques (such as mutation breeding) are excluded from labelling and regulation based on "convention" and traditional usage.

The Non-GMO Project is the sole U.S. organization that does verifiable testing and places seals on labels for presence of GMO in products. The "Non-GMO Project Seal" indicates that the product contains 0.9% or less GMO ingredients, which is the European Union's standard for labeling.

Efforts across the world that are being made to help restrict and label GMO's in food involve anti-genetic engineering campaigns and in America the "Just Label It" movement is joining organizations together to call for mandatory labeling.

=== Detection ===
Testing on GMOs in food and feed is routinely done using molecular techniques such as PCR and bioinformatics.

In a January 2010 paper, the extraction and detection of DNA along a complete industrial soybean oil processing chain was described to monitor the presence of Roundup Ready (RR) soybean: "The amplification of soybean lectin gene by end-point polymerase chain reaction (PCR) was successfully achieved in all the steps of extraction and refining processes, until the fully refined soybean oil. The amplification of RR soybean by PCR assays using event-specific primers was also achieved for all the extraction and refining steps, except for the intermediate steps of refining (neutralisation, washing and bleaching) possibly due to sample instability. The real-time PCR assays using specific probes confirmed all the results and proved that it is possible to detect and quantify genetically modified organisms in the fully refined soybean oil. To our knowledge, this has never been reported before and represents an important accomplishment regarding the traceability of genetically modified organisms in refined oils."

According to Thomas Redick, detection and prevention of cross-pollination is possible through the suggestions offered by the Farm Service Agency (FSA) and Natural Resources Conservation Service (NRCS). Suggestions include educating farmers on the importance of coexistence, providing farmers with tools and incentives to promote coexistence, conducting research to understand and monitor gene flow, providing assurance of quality and diversity in crops, and providing compensation for actual economic losses for farmers.

=== Regulation methodology design ===
Scientists have argued or elaborated a need for an evidence-based reform of regulation of genetically modified crops that moves it from regulation based on characteristics of the development-process (process-based regulation) to characteristics of the product (product-based regulation).

Various countries have adopted either of these two approaches, but many countries appear to be moving towards product-based regulation – such as the US, Canada, and England. With the exception of England, the rest of the UK has remained in a more process-based regulation approach, which follows the rest of the European Union (EU).

Specifically in the United States, many federal organizations are involved in advocating for regulation and consumer education regarding GMOs. In 2020, the U.S. Food and Drug Administration (FDA), U.S. Department of Agriculture (USDA), and the U.S. Environmental Protection Agency (EPA) launched the "Feed Your Mind" initiative. This program aims to provide consumers with more scientific information about the foods they are purchasing and how they may have been genetically modified.

== Controversies ==
The genetically modified foods controversy consists of a set of disputes over the use of food made from genetically modified crops. The disputes involve consumers, farmers, biotechnology companies, governmental regulators, non-governmental organizations, environmental and political activists and scientists. The major disagreements include whether GM foods can be safely consumed, harm the human body and the environment and/or are adequately tested and regulated.

The conflicts have continued since GM foods were invented. They have occupied the media, the courts, local, regional, national governments, and international organizations.

"GMO-free" labelling schemes are causing controversies in farming community due to lack of clear definition, inconsistency of their application and are described as "deceptive".

=== Allergenicity ===
New allergies could be introduced inadvertently, according to scientists, community groups, and members of the public concerned about the genetic variation of foods. An example involves the methionine rich soybean production. Methionine is an amino acid obtained by synthesizing substances derived from Brazil nuts, which could be an allergen. A gene from the Brazil nut was inserted into soybeans during laboratory trials. Because it was discovered that those who were allergic to Brazil nuts could also be allergic to genetically modified soybeans, the experiment was stopped. In vitro assays such as RAST or serum from people allergic to the original crop could be applied to test the allergenicity of GM goods with known source of the gene. This was established in GM soybeans that expressed Brazil nut 2S proteins and GM potatoes that expressed cod protein genes. The expression and synthesis of new proteins that were previously unavailable in parental cells were achieved by gene transfer from the cells of one organism to the nuclei of another organism. The potential risks of allergy that may develop with the intake of transgenic food come from the amino acid sequence in protein formation. However, there have been no reports of allergic reactions to currently approved GM foods for human consumption, and experiments showed no measurable difference in allergenicity between GM and non-GM soybeans.

=== Resistance genes ===
Scientists suggest that consumers should also pay attention to the health issues associated with the utilizations of pesticide-resistant and herbicide-resistant plants. The 'Bt' genes currently confer insect resistance in GM crops; however, other methods of achieving insect resistance are being developed. The Bt genes are typically obtained from the soil bacteria Bacillus thuringiensis, which can generate a protein that breaks down in an insect's gut, releasing a toxin called delta-endotoxin that causes paralysis and death. Concerns related to the expression of transgenic material include resistance development and off-target effects of crops expressing Bt toxins, consequences of transgenic herbicide-tolerant plants caused by herbicide use, and the potential transfer of gene expression from GM crops via vertical and horizontal gene transfer.

=== Environmental impacts ===
Another concern raised by ecologists is the possible spread of the pest-resistant genes to wildlife. This is an example of gene pollution, which is often associated with a decrease in biodiversity, the proliferation of resistant weeds, and the formation of new pests and pathogens.

Studies have proven that herbicide-resistant pollen from transgenic rapeseed could spread up to 3 km, while the average gene spread of transgenic crops is 2 km and even reach to maximum 21 kilometers. The high aggressiveness of these GM crops could lead to negative consequences by competing with traditional crops for water, light, and nutrients. Crossbreeding of spreading pollens with surrounding organisms has led to the introduction of the modified resistant genes. An international database has highlighted that genetic contaminations with undesired seeds is a major problem due to the expansion of field trials and commercial cultivation of GM crops globally.

Furthermore, a decrease in the number of one pest under the impact of a pest-resistant weed could unintentionally increase the population of other pests that compete with it. Even beneficial insects, which prey on crop pests, have been exposed to dangerous doses of Bt toxin.

=== International trade ===
In December 2024, the United States–Mexico–Canada Agreement (USMCA) held a vote regarding a trade conflict between the United States and Mexico involving GM corn. Mexico had banned the genetically engineered corn for human consumption due to health concerns, such as those related to glyphosates. The United States challenged these views, claiming that they violated the trade agreement between the two countries and were not rooted in science. The panel ultimately ruled in favor of the United States, but debates are still ongoing in Mexico regarding GM corn importation and cultivation. This decision was viewed as a success for United States farmers, who benefit from the large-scale exportation of corn to Mexico.

=== Other concerns ===
The introduction of GM crops in place of more locally adapted varieties could lead to long-term negative effects on the entire agricultural system. Much of the concern with GM technology involves encoding genes that increase or decrease biochemicals. Alternatively, the newly programmed enzyme might result in the consumption of the substrate, forming and accumulating the products.

In terms of socioeconomics, GM crops are usually dependent on high levels of external products, such as pesticides and herbicides, which limits their use to high-input agriculture. This dependency, coupled with the widespread patents held on GM crops, restricts farmers' trading rights over harvested seeds without paying royalties. Other arguments against GM crops held by some opponents are based on the high costs of isolating and distributing GM crops separately from non-GM crops.

Consumer acceptance of genetically modified foods can be categorized based on their attitudes. The 'attitudinal' sector of US consumers' acceptance can be explained in part by cognitive characteristics that are not always observable. Individual characteristics and values, for example, can play a role in shaping consumer acceptance of biotechnology. The concept of transplanting animal DNA into plants is unsettling for many people. Studies have shown that consumers' attitudes towards GM technology are positively correlated with their knowledge about it. It was found that elevated acceptance of genetic modification is usually associated with a high education level, whereas high levels of perceived risks are associated with the opposite. People tend to worry about unpredictable dangers due to the lack of sufficient knowledge to predict or avoid negative impacts.

Another crucial link of the change in consumer attitudes towards genetically modified foods has been shown to be closely related to their interaction with socioeconomic and demographic characteristics, such as age, ethnicity, residence, and level of consumption. Opposition to genetically modified foods could also include religious and cultural groups, because the nature of GM foods goes against what they believe are natural products. On the one hand, it was found that consumers in most European countries, especially in northern Europe, the UK and Germany, believe that the benefits of GM foods do not outweigh the potential risks. On the other hand, consumers in the United States and other European countries generally hold to view that the risks of GM foods could be far less than the benefits it brought. GM foods are then expected to be supported by more appropriate policies and clearer regulations.

== See also ==
- List of genetically modified crops
- Genetically modified crops
- Genetically modified food controversies
- Genetically modified organisms
- California Proposition 37 (2012) - rejected labeling initiative
- Pharming (genetics) – use of genetically modified mammals to produce drugs
- Regulation of the release of genetic modified organisms
- StarLink corn recall in 2000
