= Genetically modified sugar beet =

A genetically modified sugar beet is a sugar beet that has been genetically engineered by the direct modification of its genome using biotechnology. Commercialized GM sugar beets make use of a glyphosate-resistance modification developed by Monsanto and KWS Saat. These glyphosate-resistant beets, also called 'Roundup Ready' sugar beets, were developed by 2000, but not commercialized until 2007. For international trade, sugar beets have a Maximum Residue Limit of glyphosate of 15 mg/Kg at harvest. As of 2016, GMO sugar beets are grown in the United States and Canada. In the United States, they play an important role in domestic sugar production. Studies have concluded the sugar from glyphosate-resistant sugar beets is molecularly identical to and so has the same nutritional value as sugar from conventional (non-GMO) sugar beets.

The United States imports 30% of its sugar, while the remaining 70% is extracted from domestically grown sugar beets and sugarcane. More than 1 million acres of sugar beets are cultivated annually in the United States, with a market value at harvest exceeding $1 billion. GM sugar beets are grown by more than 95 percent of the nation's sugar beet farmers. Of the domestically grown sugar crops, over half of the extracted sugar is derived from sugar beets, and the rest from sugarcane.

The glyphosate sprayed on GM beet fields significantly reduces weed growth, and thus has decreased the demand for migrant workers, who have historically been employed as seasonal workers to pull weeds on conventional sugar beet farms in the United States.

According to Monsanto, more than 37,000 acres of Roundup Ready sugar beet had been planted in Canada by 2010.

== History ==
Glyphosate-resistant sugar beets were initially developed by Monsanto and KWS Saat prior to 2000. Food companies raised concerns about consumer response to GM-sourced sugar, and as a result seed companies chose not to pursue commercialization at that time.

In 2005, the US Department of Agriculture-Animal and Plant Health Inspection Service (USDA-APHIS) deregulated glyphosate-resistant sugar beets after it conducted an environmental assessment and determined glyphosate-resistant sugar beets were highly unlikely to become a plant pest. Sugar from glyphosate-resistant sugar beets has been approved for human and animal consumption in multiple countries, but commercial production of biotech beets has been approved only in the United States and Canada.

In 2007, GM sugar beets were commercialized and GM seed sold in the United States. In 2008/2009, 60% of the sugar beets grown in the US were GM. By 2009/2010, the percentage of GM beets had grown to 95%.

In August 2010, commercial planting of GM sugar beets was suspended following a lawsuit and US district court revocation of their approval. In February 2011, the USDA-APHIS allowed GM sugar beet planting under a set of monitoring and handling requirements. In July 2012, after completing an environmental impact assessment and a plant pest risk assessment, the USDA deregulated Monsanto's Roundup Ready sugar beets.

In 2015, The Hershey Company, historically a major buyer of beet sugar, switched to cane sugar for many products due to consumer concern about GMOs.

== Controversies ==
=== Litigation over commercial regulation ===
On January 23, 2008, the Center for Food Safety, the Sierra Club, and the Organic Seed Alliance and High Mowing Seeds filed a lawsuit against USDA-APHIS regarding their decision to deregulate glyphosate-resistant sugar beets in 2005. The organizations expressed concerns regarding glyphosate-resistant sugar beets' ability to potentially cross-pollinate with conventional sugar beets.

On September 21, 2009, U.S. District Judge Jeffrey S. White, US District Court for the Northern District of California, ruled that USDA-APHIS had violated federal law in deregulating glyphosate-resistant sugar beets without adequately evaluating the environmental and socioeconomic impacts of allowing commercial production. The USDA estimated a sugar shortage would cost consumers $2.972 billion in 2011.

On August 13, 2010, Judge White revoked the deregulation of glyphosate-resistant sugar beets and declared it unlawful for growers to plant glyphosate-resistant sugar beets in the spring of 2011. As a result of this ruling, growers were permitted to harvest and process their crop at the end of the 2010 growing season, yet a ban on new plantings was enacted. After the ruling, glyphosate-resistant sugar beets could not be planted until USDA-APHIS filed an environmental impact statement (EIS), the purpose of which is to determine if environmental issues have negative effects on humans and the environment, and it may take two to three years to complete the study. After the EIS is completed, USDA-APHIS may petition to deregulate glyphosate-resistant sugar beets.

After Judge White's ruling, USDA-APHIS prepared an environmental assessment seeking partial deregulation of glyphosate-resistant sugar beets. The assessment was filed based on a request received from Monsanto and KWS SSAT AG, a German seed company. Both companies, as well as the sugar beet industry employees and growers, believed a sugar shortage would occur if glyphosate-resistant sugar beets could not be planted. As a response to this concern, USDA-APHIS developed three options in the environmental assessment to address the concerns of environmentalists, as well as those raised by the industry. The first option was to not plant glyphosate-resistant sugar beets until the EIS was completed. The second option was to allow growers to plant glyphosate-resistant sugar beets if they obtained a USDA-APHIS permit and followed specific mandates. Under the third and final option, glyphosate-resistant sugar beets would be partially deregulated, but monitored by Monsanto and KWS SSAT AG. USDA-APHIS preferred the second option. They placed the environmental assessment in the Federal Register on November 4, 2010, and received public comment for 30 days. In November 2010, in response to a suit by the original parties, Judge White ordered the destruction of plantings of genetically modified sugar beets developed by Monsanto after ruling previously that the USDA had illegally approved the biotech crop. In February 2011, a federal appeals court for the Northern district of California in San Francisco overturned the ruling, concluding, "The Plaintiffs have failed to show a likelihood of irreparable injury. Biology, geography, field experience, and permit restrictions make irreparable injury unlikely."

On February 4, 2011, the USDA-APHIS announced glyphosate-resistant sugar beets had been partially deregulated and growers would be allowed to plant seed from spring 2011 until an EIS is completed. USDA-APHIS developed requirements that growers must follow if handling glyphosate-resistant sugar beets and will monitor growers throughout the partial deregulation period. The requirements are classified into categories which include planting glyphosate-resistant sugar beets for seed production, planting for sugar production, and transporting sugar beets across state lines. Failure to follow the requirements set by USDA-APHIS may result in civil or criminal charges and destruction of the crop. In July 2012, after completing an environmental impact assessment and a plant pest risk assessment the USDA deregulated Monsanto's Roundup Ready sugar beets.

=== Potential for cross-pollination ===
In 2011, some growers of chard seed in Oregon raised concerns about the possibility of cross-pollination with GM sugar beets via windblown pollen.

=== Glyphosate-resistant weeds ===
As with other glyphosate-resistant crops, GM sugar beet farming may contribute to the growing number of glyphosate-resistant weeds. GM Corn, GM soybeans and GM cotton are grown on many times the acreage devoted to sugar beets and these crops are most affected.

== See also ==
- Genetically modified food
- Genetically modified crops
- Genetically modified food controversies
