= Vistive Gold =

Genetically engineered variety of glyphosate-resistant soybeans

MON 87705 (OECD UI: MON-877Ø5-6, also known as Vistive Gold) is a genetically engineered variety of glyphosate-resistant low-linolenic, high-oleic soybeans produced by Monsanto.

== History ==
MON 87705 was designed as a replacement for hydrogenated oils and fats, which are high in trans-fatty acids. The decreased linolenic content allows MON 87705 to have favorable characteristics for deep frying and increasing the shelf life of foods.

The Federal Register announced on 28 June 2011 that Monsanto was petitioning the Animal and Plant Health Inspection Service for a nonregulated status determination of MON 87705. The Iowa Soybean Association announced its support for deregulation of MON 87705 on September 1, 2011. On December 16, 2011, the agency granted Monsanto's petition.

The soybeans were commercially launched in 2018.

== Modified mechanisms ==
Engineered to reduce linolenic acid content, MON 87705 suppresses FATB and FAD2, endogenous genes encoding enzymes that play a role in the biosynthesis of fatty acids. This alteration more than triples oleic acid content, raising it from approximately 20% to 70% of all fatty acids, and reduces the levels of linoleic acid, stearic acid and palmitic acid present in seeds.

MON 87705 is also a Roundup Ready derivative, containing the CP4 EPSPS Agrobacterium gene that confers glyphosate resistance.

== Effects ==
It is believed that MON 87705 can yield up to US$0.60 per bushel more than conventional soybeans.

According to Joe Cornelius, Executive Director of Research and Development at Monsanto, MON 87705 has the potential to "make a real difference in efforts to produce healthier foods", for example, by reducing the saturated fat content by more than 60%.

An analyst at the Center for Food Safety commented that "No animal feeding trials were conducted on [Vistive Gold] to see what would happen when it was consumed".

=== GenØk study ===
Researchers at GenØk and the University of Canterbury concluded in a collaborative report submitted to the Norwegian government that there were "a number of methodological and conceptual weaknesses contained in the [MON 87705] dossier".

The study outlined concerns that "[t]he rates, types and pathways of exposure to MON 87705 have not been sufficiently characterized" by Monsanto, which it also said had not presented a "convincing case for having either identified or analyzed off-target effects of the novel dsRNAs expressed in soybean MON 87705, or other unintended metabolic changes". The researchers found it significant that Monsanto "excluded the production of novel small peptides being produced by regular but low level expression of intended dsRNAs," and that it had "only argued that they do not exist", which was described as lacking a basis in science. "The molecular characterization is unsatisfactory for concluding that there are no novel protein-based hazards", said the researchers.

They also found that Monsanto had not "addressed several important health issues or substantiated its claims of benefits to be derived from use of MON 87705, including the combinatorial (in food) or cumulative (in environment) effects of both high oleic acid levels and unintended increases and decreases in other fatty acids". The researchers noted that this could have implications for individuals affected by acute respiratory distress syndrome, which can be exacerbated by elevated fatty acid levels or irritation from inhalation.

The researchers also criticized the assessment, stating that "[t]he standards used for equivalence testing of surrogate proteins in the assessment lack substantive rigor to draw relevant conclusions" and that Monsanto had employed "methods and study designs [that], in our view, bias against identification of differences".

== See also ==
- Genetically modified soybean
