= Genetically modified crops =

Plants used in agriculture

Genetically modified crops (GM crops) are plants used in agriculture, the DNA of which has been modified using genetic engineering methods. Plant genomes can be engineered by physical methods or by use of Agrobacterium for the delivery of sequences hosted in T-DNA binary vectors. In most cases, the aim is to introduce a new trait to the plant which does not occur naturally in the species. Examples in food crops include resistance to certain pests, diseases, environmental conditions, reduction of spoilage, resistance to chemical treatments (e.g. resistance to a herbicide), or improving the nutrient profile of the crop. Examples in non-food crops include genetically modified trees for silviculture, and production of pharmaceutical agents, biofuels, and other industrially useful goods, as well as for bioremediation.

Farmers have widely adopted GM technology. Acreage increased from 1.7 million hectares in 1996 to 185.1 million hectares in 2016, some 12% of global cropland. As of 2016, major crop (soybean, maize, canola and cotton) traits consist of herbicide tolerance (95.9 million hectares) insect resistance (25.2 million hectares), or both (58.5 million hectares). In 2015, 53.6 million ha of Genetically modified maize were under cultivation (almost 1/3 of the maize crop). GM maize outperformed its predecessors: yield was 5.6 to 24.5% higher with less mycotoxins (−28.8%), fumonisin (−30.6%) and thricotecens (−36.5%). Non-target organisms were unaffected, except for lower populations some parasitoid wasps due to decreased populations of their pest host European corn borer; European corn borer is a target of Lepidoptera active Bt maize. Biogeochemical parameters such as lignin content did not vary, while biomass decomposition was higher.

A 2014 meta-analysis concluded that GM technology adoption had reduced chemical pesticide use by 37%, increased crop yields by 22%, and increased farmer profits by 68%. This reduction in pesticide use has been ecologically beneficial, but benefits may be reduced by overuse. Yield gains and pesticide reductions are larger for insect-resistant crops than for herbicide-tolerant crops. Yield and profit gains are higher in developing countries than in developed countries. Pesticide poisonings were reduced by between 2.4 and 9 million cases per year in India alone. A 2011 review of the relationship between Bt cotton adoption and farmer suicides in India found that "Available data show no evidence of a 'resurgence' of farmer suicides" and that "Bt cotton technology has been very effective overall in India." During the time period of Bt cotton introduction in India, farmer suicides instead declined by 25%.

There is a scientific consensus that currently available food derived from GM crops poses no greater risk to human health than conventional food, but that each GM food needs to be tested on a case-by-case basis before introduction. Nonetheless, members of the public are much less likely than scientists to perceive GM foods as safe. The legal and regulatory status of GM foods varies by country, with some nations banning or restricting them, and others permitting them with widely differing degrees of regulation.

== History ==
Humans have directly influenced the genetic makeup of plants to increase their value as a crop through domestication. The first evidence of plant domestication comes from emmer and einkorn wheat found in pre-Pottery Neolithic A villages in Southwest Asia dated about 10,500 to 10,100 BC. The Fertile Crescent of Western Asia, Egypt, and India were sites of the earliest planned sowing and harvesting of plants that had previously been gathered in the wild. Independent development of agriculture occurred in northern and southern China, Africa's Sahel, New Guinea and several regions of the Americas. The eight Neolithic founder crops (emmer wheat, einkorn wheat, barley, peas, lentils, bitter vetch, chick peas and flax) had all appeared by about 7,000 BC. Traditional crop breeders have long introduced foreign germplasm into crops by creating novel crosses. A hybrid cereal grain was created in 1875, by crossing wheat and rye. Since then traits including dwarfing genes and rust resistance have been introduced in that manner. Plant tissue culture and deliberate mutations have enabled humans to alter the makeup of plant genomes.

Modern advances in genetics have allowed humans to more directly alter plants genetics. In 1970 Hamilton Smith's lab discovered restriction enzymes that allowed DNA to be cut at specific places, enabling scientists to isolate genes from an organism's genome. DNA ligases that join broken DNA together had been discovered earlier in 1967, and by combining the two technologies, it was possible to "cut and paste" DNA sequences and create recombinant DNA. Plasmids, discovered in 1952, became important tools for transferring information between cells and replicating DNA sequences. In 1907 a bacterium that caused plant tumors, Agrobacterium tumefaciens, was discovered and in the early 1970s the tumor inducing agent was found to be a DNA plasmid called the Ti plasmid. By removing the genes in the plasmid that caused the tumor and adding in novel genes researchers were able to infect plants with A. tumefaciens and let the bacteria insert their chosen DNA sequence into the genomes of the plants. As not all plant cells were susceptible to infection by A. tumefaciens other methods were developed, including electroporation, micro-injection and particle bombardment with a gene gun (invented in 1987). In the 1980s techniques were developed to introduce isolated chloroplasts back into a plant cell that had its cell wall removed. With the introduction of the gene gun in 1987 it became possible to integrate foreign genes into a chloroplast. Genetic transformation has become very efficient in some model organisms. In 2008 genetically modified seeds were produced in Arabidopsis thaliana by dipping the flowers in an Agrobacterium solution. In 2013 CRISPR was first used to target modification of plant genomes.

The first genetically engineered crop plant was tobacco, reported in 1983. It was developed creating a chimeric gene that joined an antibiotic resistant gene to the T1 plasmid from Agrobacterium. The tobacco was infected with Agrobacterium transformed with this plasmid resulting in the chimeric gene being inserted into the plant. Through tissue culture techniques a single tobacco cell was selected that contained the gene and a new plant grown from it. The first field trials of genetically engineered plants occurred in France and the US in 1986, tobacco plants were engineered to be resistant to herbicides. In 1987 Plant Genetic Systems, founded by Marc Van Montagu and Jeff Schell, was the first company to genetically engineer insect-resistant plants by incorporating genes that produced insecticidal proteins from Bacillus thuringiensis (Bt) into tobacco. The People's Republic of China was the first country to commercialise transgenic plants, introducing a virus-resistant tobacco in 1992. In 1994 Calgene attained approval to commercially release the Flavr Savr tomato, a tomato engineered to have a longer shelf life. Also in 1994, the European Union approved tobacco engineered to be resistant to the herbicide bromoxynil, making it the first genetically engineered crop commercialised in Europe. In 1995, Monsanto's "NewLeaf" Bt Potato was approved by the Environmental Protection Agency, after having been approved by the FDA, making it the first pesticide-producing crop to be approved in the US. In 1996 a total of 35 approvals had been granted to commercially grow 8 transgenic crops and one flower crop (carnation), with 8 different traits in 6 countries plus the EU. By 2010, 29 countries had planted commercialised genetically modified crops and a further 31 countries had granted regulatory approval for transgenic crops to be imported.

GM banana cultivar QCAV-4 was approved by Australia and New Zealand in 2024. This banana resists the fungus, Fusarium oxysporum, which causes Panama disease that is fatal to the Cavendish banana, the dominant cultivar.

== Methods ==
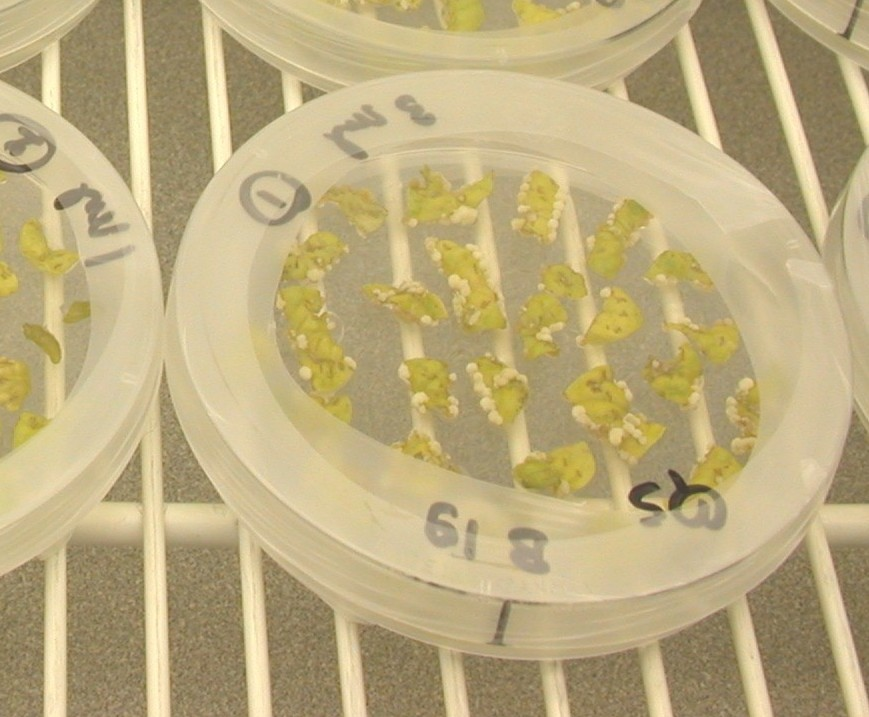
Plants (Solanum chacoense) being transformed using agrobacterium

Genetically engineered crops have genes added or removed using genetic engineering techniques, originally including gene guns, electroporation, microinjection and agrobacterium. More recently, CRISPR and TALEN offered much more precise and convenient editing techniques.

Gene guns (also known as biolistics) "shoot" (direct high energy particles or radiations against) target genes into plant cells. It is the most common method. DNA is bound to tiny particles of gold or tungsten which are subsequently shot into plant tissue or single plant cells under high pressure. The accelerated particles penetrate both the cell wall and membranes. The DNA separates from the metal and is integrated into plant DNA inside the nucleus. This method has been applied successfully for many cultivated crops, especially monocots like wheat or maize, for which transformation using Agrobacterium tumefaciens has been less successful. The major disadvantage of this procedure is that serious damage can be done to the cellular tissue.

Agrobacterium tumefaciens-mediated transformation is another common technique. Agrobacteria are natural plant parasites. Their natural ability to transfer genes provides another engineering method. To create a suitable environment for themselves, these Agrobacteria insert their genes into plant hosts, resulting in a proliferation of modified plant cells near the soil level (crown gall). The genetic information for tumor growth is encoded on a mobile, circular DNA fragment (plasmid). When Agrobacterium infects a plant, it transfers this T-DNA to a random site in the plant genome. When used in genetic engineering the bacterial T-DNA is removed from the bacterial plasmid and replaced with the desired foreign gene. The bacterium is a vector, enabling transportation of foreign genes into plants. This method works especially well for dicotyledonous plants like potatoes, tomatoes, and tobacco. Agrobacteria infection is less successful in crops like wheat and maize.

Electroporation is used when the plant tissue does not contain cell walls. In this technique, small pores are temporarily created in plant cells by electric pulses, and DNA is then introduced through these small pores.

Microinjection is used to directly introduce DNA into a cell nucleus.

Plant scientists, backed by results of modern comprehensive profiling of crop composition, point out that crops modified using GM techniques are less likely to have unintended changes than are conventionally bred crops.

In research tobacco and Arabidopsis thaliana are the most frequently modified plants, due to well-developed transformation methods, easy propagation and well studied genomes. They serve as model organisms for other plant species.

Introducing new genes into plants requires a promoter specific to the area where the gene is to be expressed. For instance, to express a gene only in rice grains and not in leaves, an endosperm-specific promoter is used. The codons of the gene must be optimized for the organism due to codon usage bias.

== Types of modifications ==
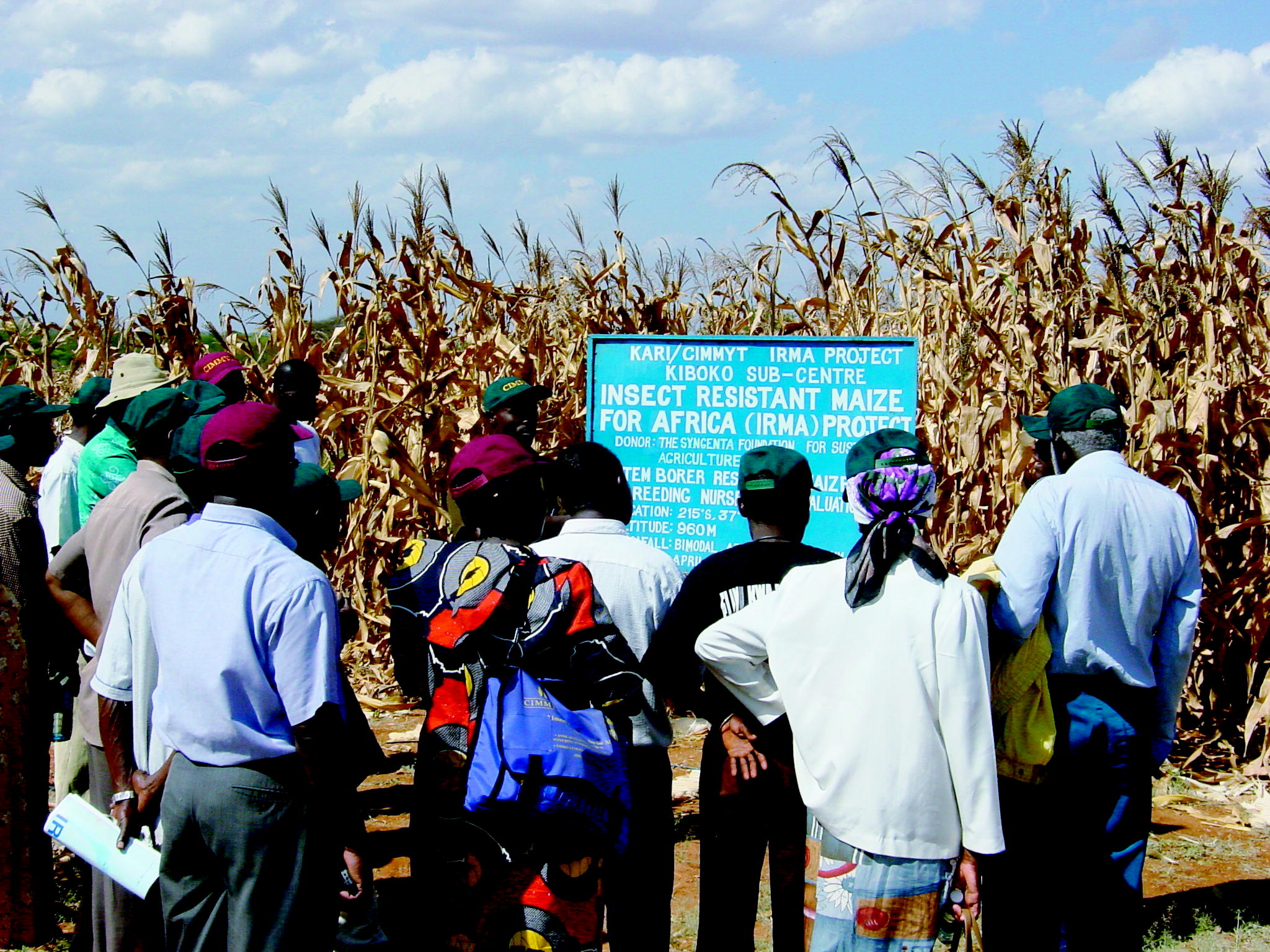
Transgenic maize containing a gene from the bacteria Bacillus thuringiensis

=== Transgenic ===
Transgenic plants have genes inserted into them that are derived from another species. The inserted genes can come from species within the same kingdom (plant to plant), or between kingdoms (for example, bacteria to plant). In many cases the inserted DNA has to be modified slightly in order to be correctly and efficiently expressed in the host organism. Transgenic plants are used to express proteins, like the cry toxins from B. thuringiensis, herbicide-resistant genes, antibodies, and antigens for vaccinations. A study led by the European Food Safety Authority (EFSA) also found viral genes in transgenic plants.

Transgenic carrots have been used to produce the drug Taliglucerase alfa which is used to treat Gaucher's disease. In the laboratory, transgenic plants have been modified to increase photosynthesis (currently about 2% at most plants versus the theoretic potential of 9–10%). This is possible by changing the rubisco enzyme (i.e. changing C_{3} plants into C_{4} plants), by placing the rubisco in a carboxysome, by adding CO_{2} pumps in the cell wall, or by changing the leaf form or size. Plants have been engineered to exhibit bioluminescence that may become a sustainable alternative to electric lighting.

=== Cisgenic ===
Cisgenic plants are made using genes found within the same species or a sexually compatible closely related one, where conventional plant breeding can occur. Some breeders and scientists argue that cisgenic modification is useful for plants that are difficult to crossbreed by conventional means (such as potatoes), and that plants in the cisgenic category should not require the same regulatory scrutiny as transgenics.

=== Subgenic ===
Genetically modified plants can also be developed using gene knockdown or gene knockout to alter the genetic makeup of a plant without incorporating genes from other plants. In 2014, Chinese researcher Gao Caixia filed patents on the creation of a strain of wheat that is resistant to powdery mildew. The strain lacks genes that encode proteins that repress defenses against the mildew. The researchers deleted all three copies of the genes from wheat's hexaploid genome. Gao used the TALENs and CRISPR gene editing tools without adding or changing any other genes. No field trials were immediately planned. The CRISPR technique has also been used by Penn State researcher Yinong Yang to modify white button mushrooms (Agaricus bisporus) to be non-browning, and by DuPont Pioneer to make a new variety of corn.

=== Multiple trait integration ===
With multiple trait integration, several new traits may be integrated into a new crop. Multiple trait GMOs are also referred to as 'stacked', such as HarvXtra, a Genetically modified alfalfa variety with both Roundup Ready and low lignin traits.

== Economics ==
GM food's economic value to farmers is one of its major benefits, including in developing nations. A 2010 study found that Bt corn provided economic benefits of $6.9 billion over the previous 14 years in five Midwestern states. The majority ($4.3 billion) accrued to farmers producing non-Bt corn. This was attributed to European corn borer populations reduced by exposure to Bt corn, leaving fewer to attack conventional corn nearby. Agriculture economists calculated that "world surplus [increased by] $240.3 million for 1996. Of this total, the largest share (59%) went to U.S. farmers. Seed company Monsanto received the next largest share (21%), followed by US consumers (9%), the rest of the world (6%), and the germplasm supplier, Delta & Pine Land Company of Mississippi (5%)."

According to the International Service for the Acquisition of Agri-biotech Applications (ISAAA), in 2014 approximately 18 million farmers grew biotech crops in 28 countries; about 94% of the farmers were resource-poor in developing countries. 53% of the global biotech crop area of 181.5 million hectares was grown in 20 developing countries. PG Economics comprehensive 2012 study concluded that GM crops increased farm incomes worldwide by $14 billion in 2010, with over half this total going to farmers in developing countries.

Forgoing these benefits is costly. Wesseler et al., 2017 estimate the cost of delay for several crops including GM banana in Uganda, GM cowpea in west Africa, and GM maize/corn in Kenya. They estimate Nigeria alone loses $33–46m annually. The potential and alleged harms of GM crops must then be compared to these costs of delay.

Critics challenged the claimed benefits to farmers over the prevalence of biased observers and by the absence of randomized controlled trials. The main Bt crop grown by small farmers in developing countries is cotton. A 2006 review of Bt cotton findings by agricultural economists concluded, "the overall balance sheet, though promising, is mixed. Economic returns are highly variable over years, farm type, and geographical location".

In 2013, the European Academies' Science Advisory Council (EASAC) asked the EU to allow the development of agricultural GM technologies to enable more sustainable agriculture, by employing fewer land, water, and nutrient resources. EASAC also criticizes the EU's "time-consuming and expensive regulatory framework" and said that the EU had fallen behind in the adoption of GM technologies.

Participants in agriculture business markets include seed companies, agrochemical companies, distributors, farmers, grain elevators and universities that develop new crops/traits and whose agricultural extensions advise farmers on best practices. According to a 2012 review based on data from the late 1990s and early 2000s, much of the GM crop grown each year is used for livestock feed and increased demand for meat leads to increased demand for GM feed crops. Feed grain usage as a percentage of total crop production is 70% for corn and more than 90% of oil seed meals such as soybeans. About 65 million metric tons of GM corn grains and about 70 million metric tons of soybean meals derived from GM soybean become feed.

In 2014 the global value of biotech seed was US$15.7 billion; US$11.3 billion (72%) was in industrial countries and US$4.4 billion (28%) was in the developing countries. In 2009, Monsanto had $7.3 billion in sales of seeds and from licensing its technology; DuPont, through its Pioneer subsidiary, was the next biggest company in that market. As of 2009, the overall Roundup line of products including the GM seeds represented about 50% of Monsanto's business.

Some patents on GM traits have expired, allowing the legal development of generic strains that include these traits. For example, generic glyphosate-tolerant GM soybean is now available. Another impact is that traits developed by one vendor can be added to another vendor's proprietary strains, potentially increasing product choice and competition. The patent on the first type of Roundup Ready crop that Monsanto produced (soybeans) expired in 2014 and the first harvest of off-patent soybeans occurs in the spring of 2015. Monsanto has broadly licensed the patent to other seed companies that include the glyphosate resistance trait in their seed products. About 150 companies have licensed the technology, including Syngenta and DuPont Pioneer.

== Yield ==
In 2014, the largest review yet concluded that GM crops' effects on farming were positive. The meta-analysis considered all published English-language examinations of the agronomic and economic impacts between 1995 and March 2014 for three major GM crops: soybean, maize, and cotton. The study found that herbicide-tolerant crops have lower production costs, while for insect-resistant crops the reduced pesticide use was offset by higher seed prices, leaving overall production costs about the same.

Yields increased 9% for herbicide tolerance and 25% for insect resistant varieties. Farmers who adopted GM crops made 69% higher profits than those who did not. The review found that GM crops help farmers in developing countries, increasing yields by 14 percentage points.

The researchers considered some studies that were not peer-reviewed and a few that did not report sample sizes. They attempted to correct for publication bias, by considering sources beyond academic journals. The large data set allowed the study to control for potentially confounding variables such as fertilizer use. Separately, they concluded that the funding source did not influence study results.

Under special conditions meant to reveal only genetic yield factors, many GM crops are known to actually have lower yields. This is variously due to one or both of: Yield drag, wherein the trait itself lowers yield, either by competing for synthesis feedstock or by being inserted slightly inaccurately, into the middle of a yield-relevant gene; and/or yield lag, wherein it takes some time to breed the newest yield genetics into the GM lines. This does not reflect realistic field conditions however, especially leaving out pest pressure which is often the point of the GM trait. See for example Roundup Ready § Productivity claims.

Gene editing may also increase yields non-specific to the use of any biocides/pesticides. In March 2022, field test results showed CRISPR-based gene knockout of KRN2 in maize and OsKRN2 in rice increased grain yields by ~10% and ~8% without any detected negative effects.

== Traits ==
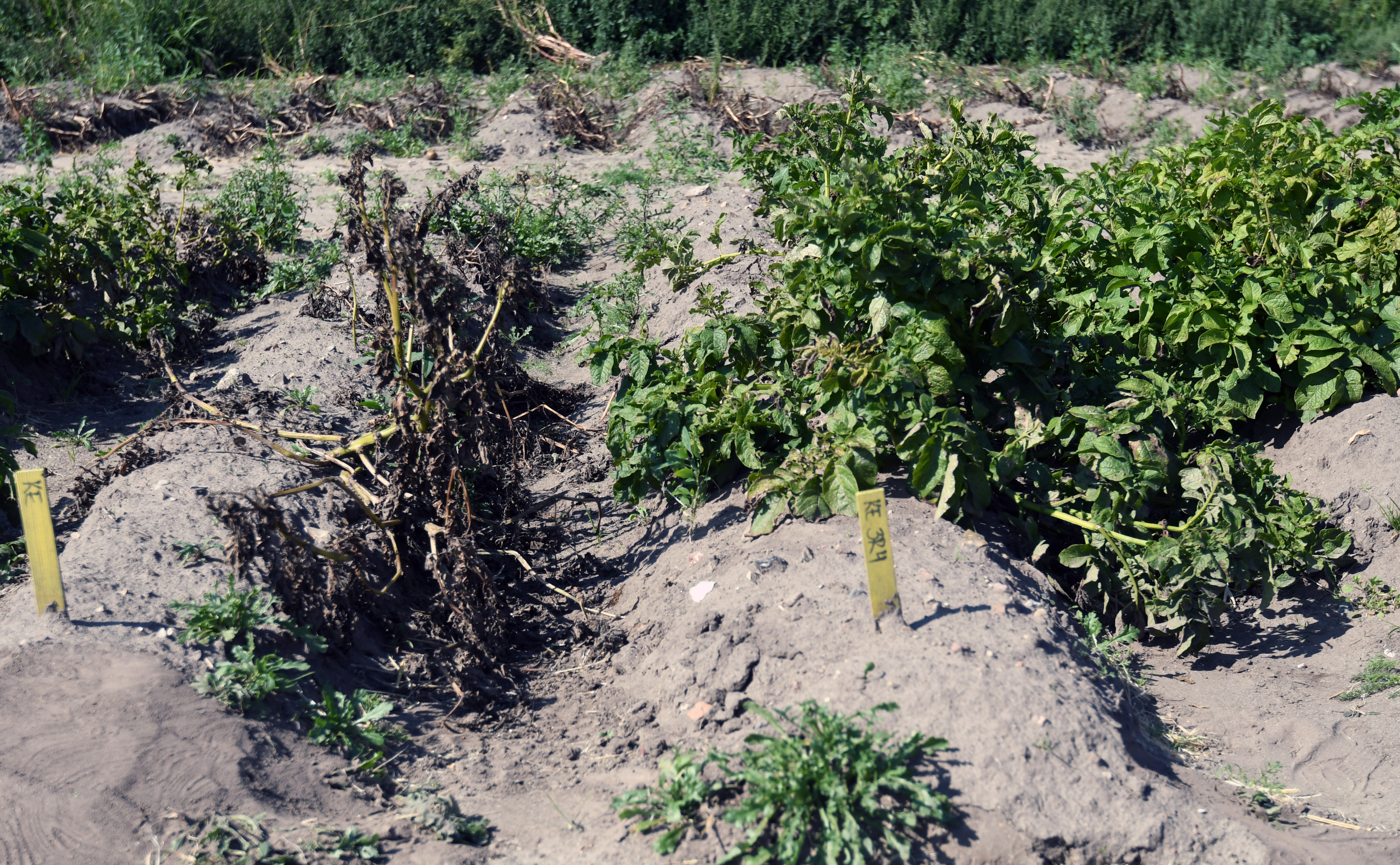
Genetically modified King Edward potato (right) next to King Edward which has not been genetically modified (left). Research field belonging to the Swedish University of Agricultural Sciences in 2019.

GM crops grown today, or under development, have been modified with various traits. These traits include improved shelf life, disease resistance, stress resistance, herbicide resistance, pest resistance, production of useful goods such as biofuel or drugs, and ability to absorb toxins and for use in bioremediation of pollution.

Recently, research and development has been targeted to enhancement of crops that are locally important in developing countries, such as insect-resistant cowpea for Africa and insect-resistant brinjal (eggplant).

=== Extended shelf life ===
The first genetically modified crop approved for sale in the U.S. was the FlavrSavr tomato, which had a longer shelf life. First sold in 1994, FlavrSavr tomato production ceased in 1997. It is no longer on the market.

In November 2014, the USDA approved a GM potato that prevents bruising.

In February 2015, Arctic Apples were approved by the USDA, becoming the first genetically modified apple approved for US sale. Gene silencing was used to reduce the expression of polyphenol oxidase (PPO), thus preventing enzymatic browning of the fruit after it has been sliced open. The trait was added to Granny Smith and Golden Delicious varieties. The FDA approved the apples in March 2015.

=== Improved photosynthesis ===
Plants use non-photochemical quenching to protect them from excessive amounts of sunlight. Plants can switch on the quenching mechanism almost instantaneously, but it takes much longer for it to switch off again. During the time that it is switched on, the amount of energy that is wasted increases. A genetic modification in three genes allows to correct this (in a trial with tobacco plants). As a result, yields were 14-20% higher, in terms of the weight of the dry leaves harvested. The plants had larger leaves, were taller and had more vigorous roots.

Another improvement that can be made on the photosynthesis process (with C3 pathway plants) is on photorespiration. By inserting the C4 pathway into C3 plants, productivity may increase by as much as 50% for cereal crops, such as rice.

=== Improved biosequestration capability ===
Biosequestration refers to the process of capturing and storing atmospheric carbon dioxide into living matter such as plants, trees and soil. Plants and trees act as carbon sinks by absorbing CO_{2} during photosynthesis and storing it in roots, stems, and leaves. It is also stored in the soil as soil organic carbon (SOC). Aquatic ecosystems such as mangroves, marshes and oceans also absorb and store massive amounts of CO_{2}.

The Harnessing Plants Initiative focuses on creating GM crops like wheat, rice, maize and soybean that can create larger, deeper root systems that are enhanced to produce high amounts of suberin. Since suberin is highly resistant to decomposition, it locks the absorbed CO_{2} underground for decades to hundreds of years. Such modifications also help to replenish depleted soils, improve land quality, restore water levels and improve the tolerance of crops to drought.

=== Nitrogen fixation ===
Plants such as legumes obtain nitrogen through a symbiotic relationship with diazotrophic bacteria that fix nitrogen from the air and transfer it to the soil in the form of ammonia, where it is absorbed by the roots. Other crops, including cereals important for human consumption such as corn/maize, wheat, and rice, generally depend on nitrogen fertilizers. The use of these fertilizers contributes to the eutrophication of water bodies and to climate change due to nitrous oxide emissions. Without fertilizers, these plants grow less and produce fewer grains. Recent research has developed innovative strategies to supply nitrogen more sustainably, reducing dependence on synthetic fertilizers. Approaches include genetically engineering non-legume crops to serve as more effective hosts for nitrogen-fixing microbes, transferring nitrogen-fixing genes (nif genes) to soil bacteria to establish a symbiotic relationship with cereals similar to that of legumes, or, more challenging, directly introducing these genes into plants to enable them to fix their own nitrogen. Other strategies focus on enhancing crops’ nitrogen-use efficiency, allowing them to achieve optimal growth with reduced nitrogen inputs.

=== Improved nutritional value ===
==== Edible oils ====
Some GM soybeans offer improved oil profiles for processing. Soybeans have been genetically modified to improve the quality of soybean oil. Soy oil has a fatty acid profile that makes it susceptible to oxidation, which makes it rancid, which limits its usefulness in the food industry. Genetic modifications increased the amount of oleic acid and stearic acid and decreased the amount of linolenic acid. By silencing, or knocking out, the delta 9 and delta 12 desaturases. DuPont Pioneer has developed a soybean with a high content of monounsaturated fatty acids (oleic acid) and a lower content of polyunsaturated fatty acids (linoleic and linolenic acids), with oleic acid levels above 80%, and began marketing it in 2010. In comparison, Monsanto’s MON 87705 soybean also exhibits elevated oleic acid levels and reduced polyunsaturated fatty acids, MON 87705 also has a reduction in saturated fatty acids, including palmitic and stearic acids, compared with conventional soybean oil.

Camelina sativa has been modified to produce plants that accumulate high levels of oils similar to fish oils.

==== Vitamin enrichment ====
Golden Rice, developed by the International Rice Research Institute (IRRI), provides increased amounts of vitamin A. It was engineered with three genes capable of biosynthesizing beta-carotene, a precursor of vitamin A, in the edible parts of the rice. The goal is to produce a biofortified food for cultivation and consumption in regions with vitamin A deficiency.

Cassava (Manihot esculenta) is a staple root crop native to the sub-Saharan regions, which typically is not a nutrient-dense food source and contributes to less than 30% of protein requirements and less than 20% of mineral and vitamin requirements. Studies on genetic biofortification of cassava, using algae and Arabidopsis genes, have successfully resulted in increased efficiency other than the increase in protein and micronutrient concentrations, particularly that of iron and zinc, as well as Vitamin A and Vitamin E.

A genetically modified cassava, called BioCassava, under development offers enhanced protein and other nutrients.

==== Toxin reduction ====
BioCassava has also shown reduction in toxic cyanogen glucosides and resistance to viral diseases.

In November 2014, the USDA approved a potato that prevents bruising and produces less acrylamide when fried. They do not employ genes from non-potato species. The trait was added to the Russet Burbank, Ranger Russet and Atlantic varieties.

A variety of cotton was genetically modified to remove the toxin gossypol from its seeds, making them safe for human consumption. The toxin remains present in other parts of the plant to protect against pests.

=== Stress resistance ===
Plants have been engineered to tolerate non-biological stressors, such as drought, frost, and high soil salinity. In 2011, Monsanto's DroughtGard maize became the first drought-resistant GM crop to receive US marketing approval.

Drought tolerance in genetically modified plants is achieved by inserting genes that regulate physiological and biochemical responses to water stress. A common example is the introduction of transcription factors from the HD-Zip I family, originally isolated from drought-resistant plants such as sunflowers. These regulatory genes act by increasing the expression of proteins involved in antioxidant defense, maintaining cell integrity, and improving water use efficiency, allowing the plant to survive periods of water scarcity with less impact on growth and productivity.

Another possible mechanism for drought resistance occurs through the modification of plant genes responsible for the mechanism known as crassulacean acid metabolism (CAM), which allows plants to survive despite low water levels. This is promising for crops that require a lot of water, such as rice, wheat, soybeans, and poplar, to accelerate their adaptation to water-limited environments. Several salinity tolerance mechanisms have been identified in salt-tolerant crops. For example, rice, canola and tomato crops have been genetically modified to increase their tolerance to salt stress.

=== Herbicides ===
==== Glyphosate ====
The most prevalent GM trait is herbicide tolerance, where glyphosate-tolerance is the most common. Glyphosate (the active ingredient in Roundup and other herbicide products) kills plants by interfering with the shikimate pathway in plants, which is essential for the synthesis of the aromatic amino acids phenylalanine, tyrosine, and tryptophan. The shikimate pathway is not present in animals, which instead obtain aromatic amino acids from their diet. More specifically, glyphosate inhibits the enzyme 5-enolpyruvylshikimate-3-phosphate synthase (EPSPS).

This trait was developed because the herbicides used on grain and grass crops at the time were highly toxic and not effective against narrow-leaved weeds. Thus, developing crops that could withstand spraying with glyphosate would both reduce environmental and health risks, and give an agricultural edge to the farmer.

Some micro-organisms have a version of EPSPS that is resistant to glyphosate inhibition. One of these was isolated from an Agrobacterium strain CP4 (CP4 EPSPS) that was resistant to glyphosate. The CP4 EPSPS gene was engineered for plant expression by fusing the 5' end of the gene to a chloroplast transit peptide derived from the petunia EPSPS. This transit peptide was used because it had shown previously an ability to deliver bacterial EPSPS to the chloroplasts of other plants. This CP4 EPSPS gene was cloned and transfected into soybeans.

The plasmid used to move the gene into soybeans was PV-GMGTO4. It contained three bacterial genes, two CP4 EPSPS genes, and a gene encoding beta-glucuronidase (GUS) from Escherichia coli as a marker. The DNA was injected into the soybeans using the particle acceleration method. Soybean cultivar A54O3 was used for the transformation.

==== Bromoxynil ====
Tobacco plants have been engineered to be resistant to the herbicide bromoxynil.

==== Glufosinate ====
Crops have been commercialized that are resistant to the herbicide glufosinate, as well. Crops engineered for resistance to multiple herbicides to allow farmers to use a mixed group of two, three, or four different chemicals are under development to combat growing herbicide resistance.

The modification is achieved by inserting the pat or bar gene, responsible for the synthesis of the enzyme phosphinothricin acetyltransferase (PAT), which converts L-phosphinothricin (glufosinate) to non-toxic products by acetylation of the amino group, inactivating the active ingredient and thus conferring herbicide tolerance on the plant. The bar and pat genes were isolated from Streptomyces hygroscopicus and Streptomyces viridochromogenes in 1987 and 1988, respectively. Other methods for conferring resistance to glufosinate have been reported, but to date only the pat or bar genes have been used commercially in the development of crops resistant to this herbicide.

==== 2,4-D ====
In October 2014 the US EPA registered Dow's Enlist Duo maize, which is genetically modified to be resistant to both glyphosate and 2,4-D, in six states. Inserting a bacterial aryloxyalkanoate dioxygenase gene, aad1 makes the corn resistant to 2,4-D. The USDA had approved maize and soybeans with the mutation in September 2014.

==== Dicamba ====
Monsanto has requested approval for a stacked strain that is tolerant of both glyphosate and dicamba. The request includes plans for avoiding herbicide drift to other crops. Significant damage to other non-resistant crops occurred from dicamba formulations intended to reduce volatilization drifting when sprayed on resistant soybeans in 2017. The newer dicamba formulation labels specify to not spray when average wind speeds are above 10–15 miles per hour (16–24 km/h) to avoid particle drift, average wind speeds below 3 miles per hour (4.8 km/h) to avoid temperature inversions, and rain or high temperatures are in the next day forecast. However, these conditions typically only occur during June and July for a few hours at a time.

=== Pest resistance ===
==== Insects ====
Tobacco, corn, rice and some other crops have been engineered to express genes encoding for insecticidal proteins from Bacillus thuringiensis (Bt). The introduction of Bt crops during the period between 1996 and 2005 has been estimated to have reduced the total volume of insecticide active ingredient use in the United States by over 100 thousand tons. This represents a 19.4% reduction in insecticide use.

In the late 1990s, a genetically modified potato that was resistant to the Colorado potato beetle was withdrawn because major buyers rejected it, fearing consumer opposition.

==== Viruses ====
Plant viruses are a cause of around half of the plant diseases emerging worldwide, and an estimated 10–15% of losses in crop yields. Papaya, potatoes, and squash have been engineered to resist viral pathogens such as cucumber mosaic virus which, despite its name, infects a wide variety of plants. Virus resistant papaya were developed in response to a papaya ringspot virus (PRV) outbreak in Hawaii in the late 1990s. They incorporate PRV DNA. By 2010, 80% of Hawaiian papaya plants were genetically modified.

Potatoes were engineered for resistance to potato leaf roll virus and Potato virus Y in 1998. Poor sales led to their market withdrawal after three years.

Yellow squash that were resistant to at first two, then three viruses were developed, beginning in the 1990s. The viruses are watermelon, cucumber and zucchini/courgette yellow mosaic. Squash was the second GM crop to be approved by US regulators. The trait was later added to zucchini.

Many strains of corn have been developed in recent years to combat the spread of Maize dwarf mosaic virus, a costly virus that causes stunted growth which is carried in Johnson grass and spread by aphid insect vectors. These strands are commercially available although the resistance is not standard among GM corn variants.

=== By-products ===
==== Drugs ====
In 2012, the FDA approved the first plant-produced pharmaceutical, a treatment for Gaucher's Disease. Tobacco plants have been modified to produce therapeutic antibodies.

==== Biofuel ====
Algae is under development for use in biofuels. The focus of Microalgae for mass production for biofuels modifying the algae to produce more lipid has become a focus yet will take years to see results due to the cost of this process to extract lipids. Researchers in Singapore were working on GM jatropha for biofuel production. Syngenta has USDA approval to market a maize trademarked Enogen that has been genetically modified to convert its starch to sugar for ethanol. Some trees have been genetically modified to either have less lignin, or to express lignin with chemically labile bonds. Lignin is the critical limiting factor when using wood to make bio-ethanol because lignin limits the accessibility of cellulose microfibrils to depolymerization by enzymes. Besides with trees, the chemically labile lignin bonds are also very useful for cereal crops such as maize,

==== Materials ====
Companies and labs are working on plants that can be used to make bioplastics. Potatoes that produce industrially useful starches have been developed as well. Oilseed can be modified to produce fatty acids for detergents, substitute fuels and petrochemicals.

==== Non-pesticide pest management products ====
Besides the modified oilcrop above, Camelina sativa has also been modified to produce Helicoverpa armigera pheromones and is in progress with a Spodoptera frugiperda version. The H. armigera pheromones have been tested and are effective.

=== Bioremediation ===
Scientists at the University of York developed a weed (Arabidopsis thaliana) that contains genes from bacteria that could clean TNT and RDX-explosive soil contaminants in 2011. 16 million hectares in the US (1.5% of the total surface) are estimated to be contaminated with TNT and RDX. However A. thaliana was not tough enough for use on military test grounds. Modifications in 2016 included switchgrass and bentgrass.

Genetically modified plants have been used for bioremediation of contaminated soils. Mercury, selenium and organic pollutants such as polychlorinated biphenyls (PCBs).

Marine environments are especially vulnerable since pollution such as oil spills are not containable. In addition to anthropogenic pollution, millions of tons of petroleum annually enter the marine environment from natural seepages. Despite its toxicity, a considerable fraction of petroleum oil entering marine systems is eliminated by the hydrocarbon-degrading activities of microbial communities. Particularly successful is a recently discovered group of specialists, the so-called hydrocarbonoclastic bacteria (HCCB) that may offer useful genes.

=== Asexual reproduction ===
Crops such as maize reproduce sexually each year. This randomizes which genes get propagated to the next generation, meaning that desirable traits can be lost. To maintain a high-quality crop, some farmers purchase seeds every year. Typically, the seed company maintains two inbred varieties and crosses them into a hybrid strain that is then sold. Related plants like sorghum and gamma grass are able to perform apomixis, a form of asexual reproduction that keeps the plant's DNA intact. This trait is apparently controlled by a single dominant gene, but traditional breeding has been unsuccessful in creating asexually-reproducing maize. Genetic engineering offers another route to this goal. Successful modification would allow farmers to replant harvested seeds that retain desirable traits, rather than relying on purchased seed.

=== Other ===
Genetic modifications to some crops also exist, which make it easier to process the crop, i.e. by growing it in a more compact form. Crops such as tomatoes have been modified to be seedless. Tobacco has been modified to produce chlorophyll c in addition to a and b, increasing growth rates. The transgene was discovered in marine algae, which uses it to gain energy from the blue light that is able to penetrate seawater more effectively than longer wavelengths.

== Crops ==
=== Herbicide tolerance ===
Crop	Use	Countries approved in	First approved	Notes
Alfalfa	Animal feed	US	2005	Approval withdrawn in 2007 and then re-approved in 2011
Canola	Cooking oil Margarine Emulsifiers in packaged foods	Australia	2003	
Canola	Cooking oil Margarine Emulsifiers in packaged foods	Canada	1995	
Canola	Cooking oil Margarine Emulsifiers in packaged foods	US	1995	
Cotton	Fiber; Cottonseed oil Animal feed	Argentina	2001	
Cotton	Fiber; Cottonseed oil Animal feed	Australia	2002	
Cotton	Fiber; Cottonseed oil Animal feed	Brazil	2008	
Cotton	Fiber; Cottonseed oil Animal feed	Colombia	2004	
Cotton	Fiber; Cottonseed oil Animal feed	Costa Rica	2008	
Cotton	Fiber; Cottonseed oil Animal feed	Mexico	2000	
Cotton	Fiber; Cottonseed oil Animal feed	Paraguay	2013	
Cotton	Fiber; Cottonseed oil Animal feed	South Africa	2000	
Cotton	Fiber; Cottonseed oil Animal feed	US	1994	
Maize	Animal feed high-fructose corn syrup corn starch	Argentina	1998	
Maize	Animal feed high-fructose corn syrup corn starch	Brazil	2007	
Maize	Animal feed high-fructose corn syrup corn starch	Canada	1996	
Maize	Animal feed high-fructose corn syrup corn starch	Colombia	2007	
Maize	Animal feed high-fructose corn syrup corn starch	Cuba	2011	
Maize	Animal feed high-fructose corn syrup corn starch	European Union	1998	Grown in Portugal, Spain, Czech Republic, Slovakia and Romania
Maize	Animal feed high-fructose corn syrup corn starch	Honduras	2001	
Maize	Animal feed high-fructose corn syrup corn starch	Paraguay	2012	
Maize	Animal feed high-fructose corn syrup corn starch	Philippines	2002	
Maize	Animal feed high-fructose corn syrup corn starch	South Africa	2002	
Maize	Animal feed high-fructose corn syrup corn starch	US	1995	
Maize	Animal feed high-fructose corn syrup corn starch	Uruguay	2003	
Soybean	Animal feed Soybean oil	Argentina	1996	
Soybean	Animal feed Soybean oil	Bolivia	2005	
Soybean	Animal feed Soybean oil	Brazil	1998	
Soybean	Animal feed Soybean oil	Canada	1995	
Soybean	Animal feed Soybean oil	Chile	2007	
Soybean	Animal feed Soybean oil	Costa Rica	2001	
Soybean	Animal feed Soybean oil	Mexico	1996	
Soybean	Animal feed Soybean oil	Paraguay	2004	
Soybean	Animal feed Soybean oil	South Africa	2001	
Soybean	Animal feed Soybean oil	US	1993	
Soybean	Animal feed Soybean oil	Uruguay	1996	
Sugar Beet	Food	Canada	2001	
Sugar Beet	Food	US	1998	Commercialised 2007, production blocked 2010, resumed 2011.

=== Insect resistance ===
Crop	Use	Countries approved in	First approved	Notes
Cotton	Fiber; Cottonseed oil Animal feed	Argentina	1998	
Cotton	Fiber; Cottonseed oil Animal feed	Australia	2003	
Cotton	Fiber; Cottonseed oil Animal feed	Brazil	2005	
Cotton	Fiber; Cottonseed oil Animal feed	Burkina Faso	2009	
Cotton	Fiber; Cottonseed oil Animal feed	China	1997	
Cotton	Fiber; Cottonseed oil Animal feed	Colombia	2003	
Cotton	Fiber; Cottonseed oil Animal feed	Costa Rica	2008	
Cotton	Fiber; Cottonseed oil Animal feed	India	2002	Largest producer of Bt cotton
Cotton	Fiber; Cottonseed oil Animal feed	Mexico	1996	
Cotton	Fiber; Cottonseed oil Animal feed	Myanmar	2006 (Note: No official public documentation available)	
Cotton	Fiber; Cottonseed oil Animal feed	Pakistan	2010	
Cotton	Fiber; Cottonseed oil Animal feed	Paraguay	2007	
Cotton	Fiber; Cottonseed oil Animal feed	South Africa	1997	
Cotton	Fiber; Cottonseed oil Animal feed	Sudan	2012	
Cotton	Fiber; Cottonseed oil Animal feed	US	1995	
Eggplant	Food	Bangladesh	2013	12 ha planted on 120 farms in 2014
Maize	Animal feed high-fructose corn syrup corn starch	Argentina	1998	
Maize	Animal feed high-fructose corn syrup corn starch	Brazil	2005	
Maize	Animal feed high-fructose corn syrup corn starch	Colombia	2003	
Maize	Animal feed high-fructose corn syrup corn starch	Mexico	1996	Centre of origin for maize
Maize	Animal feed high-fructose corn syrup corn starch	Paraguay	2007	
Maize	Animal feed high-fructose corn syrup corn starch	Philippines	2002	
Maize	Animal feed high-fructose corn syrup corn starch	South Africa	1997	
Maize	Animal feed high-fructose corn syrup corn starch	Uruguay	2003	
Maize	Animal feed high-fructose corn syrup corn starch	US	1995	
Poplar	Tree	China	1998	543 ha of bt poplar planted in 2014

=== Other modified traits ===
Crop	Use	Trait	Countries approved in	First approved	Notes
Canola	Cooking oil Margarine Emulsifiers in packaged foods	High laurate canola	Canada	1996	
Canola	Cooking oil Margarine Emulsifiers in packaged foods	High laurate canola	US	1994	
Canola	Cooking oil Margarine Emulsifiers in packaged foods	Phytase production	US	1998	
Carnation	Ornamental	Delayed senescence	Australia	1995	
Carnation	Ornamental	Delayed senescence	Norway	1998	
Carnation	Ornamental	Modified flower colour	Australia	1995	
Carnation	Ornamental	Modified flower colour	Colombia	2000	In 2014 4 ha were grown in greenhouses for export
Carnation	Ornamental	Modified flower colour	European Union	1998	Two events expired 2008, another approved 2007
Carnation	Ornamental	Modified flower colour	Japan	2004	
Carnation	Ornamental	Modified flower colour	Malaysia	2012	For ornamental purposes
Carnation	Ornamental	Modified flower colour	Norway	1997	
Maize	Animal feed high-fructose corn syrup corn starch	Increased lysine	Canada	2006	
Maize	Animal feed high-fructose corn syrup corn starch	Increased lysine	US	2006	
Maize	Animal feed high-fructose corn syrup corn starch	Drought tolerance	Canada	2010	
Maize	Animal feed high-fructose corn syrup corn starch	Drought tolerance	US	2011	
Papaya	Food	Virus resistance	China	2006	
Papaya	Food	Virus resistance	US	1996	Mostly grown in Hawaii
Petunia	Ornamental	Modified flower colour	China	1997	
Potato	Food	Virus resistance	Canada	1999	
Potato	Food	Virus resistance	US	1997	
Potato	Industrial	Modified starch	US	2014	
Rose	Ornamental	Modified flower colour	Australia	2009	Surrendered renewal
Rose	Ornamental	Modified flower colour	Colombia	2010 (Note: No public documents)	Greenhouse cultivation for export only.
Rose	Ornamental	Modified flower colour	Japan	2008	
Rose	Ornamental	Modified flower colour	US	2011	
Soybean	Animal feed Soybean oil	Increased oleic acid production	Argentina	2015	
Soybean	Animal feed Soybean oil	Increased oleic acid production	Canada	2000	
Soybean	Animal feed Soybean oil	Increased oleic acid production	US	1997	
Soybean	Animal feed Soybean oil	Stearidonic acid production	Canada	2011	
Soybean	Animal feed Soybean oil	Stearidonic acid production	US	2011	
Squash	Food	Virus resistance	US	1994	
Sugar Cane	Food	Drought tolerance	Indonesia	2013	Environmental certificate only
Tobacco	Cigarettes	Nicotine reduction	US	2002	

=== GM Camelina ===
Several modifications of Camelina sativa have been done, see §Edible oils and §Non-pesticide pest management products above.

=== Development ===
The number of USDA-approved field releases for testing grew from 4 in 1985 to 1,194 in 2002 and averaged around 800 per year thereafter. The number of sites per release and the number of gene constructs (ways that the gene of interest is packaged together with other elements) – have rapidly increased since 2005. Releases with agronomic properties (such as drought resistance) jumped from 1,043 in 2005 to 5,190 in 2013. As of September 2013, about 7,800 releases had been approved for corn, more than 2,200 for soybeans, more than 1,100 for cotton, and about 900 for potatoes. Releases were approved for herbicide tolerance (6,772 releases), insect resistance (4,809), product quality such as flavor or nutrition (4,896), agronomic properties like drought resistance (5,190), and virus/fungal resistance (2,616). The institutions with the most authorized field releases include Monsanto with 6,782, Pioneer/DuPont with 1,405, Syngenta with 565, and USDA's Agricultural Research Service with 370. As of September 2013 USDA had received proposals for releasing GM rice, squash, plum, rose, tobacco, flax, and chicory.

=== GMO designer plants for Mars ===
Researchers at North Carolina State University are designing genetically modified plants or seeds to ship to Mars, that can live in habitable greenhouses or bio-domes to help build plant life on the planet. NASA's NIAC is sponsoring this work on designer plants/trees or genetically modified vegetation that could better survive on Mars. CRISPR gene editing from extremophiles on Earth is used to help withstand the harsh Martian regolith and atmosphere, including such challenges as ultraviolet radiation, extreme cold, low atmospheric pressure, perchlorates, and drought tolerance. The plants and seeds could then be tested outdoors to try and start an ecosystem for the full terraforming of Mars.

== Farming practices ==
=== Resistance ===
==== Bacillus thuringiensis ====
Constant exposure to a toxin creates evolutionary pressure for pests resistant to that toxin.

To reduce resistance to Bacillus thuringiensis (Bt) crops, the 1996 commercialization of transgenic cotton and maize came with a management strategy to prevent insects from becoming resistant. An insect resistance management strategy is now mandatory for GM crops in the United States. The main measure is the use of refuges. The aim is to encourage a large population of pests so that any (recessive) resistance genes are diluted within the population. Resistance lowers evolutionary fitness in the absence of the stressor, Bt. In refuges, non-resistant strains outcompete resistant ones.

With sufficiently high levels of transgene expression, nearly all of the heterozygotes (S/s), i.e., the largest segment of the pest population carrying a resistance allele, will be killed before maturation, thus preventing transmission of the resistance gene to their progeny. Refuges (i. e., fields of nontransgenic plants) adjacent to transgenic fields increases the likelihood that homozygous resistant (s/s) individuals and any surviving heterozygotes will mate with susceptible (S/S) individuals from the refuge, instead of with other individuals carrying the resistance allele. As a result, the resistance gene frequency in the population remains lower.

Complicating factors can affect the success of the high-dose/refuge strategy. For example, if the temperature is not ideal, thermal stress can lower Bt toxin production and leave the plant more susceptible. More importantly, reduced late-season expression has been documented, possibly resulting from DNA methylation of the promoter. The success of the high-dose/refuge strategy has successfully maintained the value of Bt crops. This success has depended on factors independent of management strategy, including low initial resistance allele frequencies, fitness costs associated with resistance, and the abundance of non-Bt host plants outside the refuges.

Companies that produce Bt seed are introducing strains with multiple Bt proteins. Monsanto did this with Bt cotton in India, where the product was rapidly adopted. Monsanto has also; in an attempt to simplify the process of implementing refuges in fields to comply with Insect Resistance Management policies and prevent irresponsible planting practices; begun marketing seed bags with a set proportion of refuge (non-transgenic) seeds mixed in with the Bt seeds being sold. Coined "Refuge-In-a-Bag", this practice is intended to increase farmer compliance with refuge requirements and reduce additional labor needed at planting from having separate Bt and refuge seed bags on hand. This strategy is likely to reduce the likelihood of Bt-resistance occurring for corn rootworm, but may increase the risk of resistance for lepidopteran corn pests, such as European corn borer. Increased concerns for resistance with seed mixtures include partially resistant larvae on a Bt plant being able to move to a susceptible plant to survive or cross pollination of refuge pollen on to Bt plants that can lower the amount of Bt expressed in kernels for ear feeding insects.

==== Herbicide resistance ====
Best management practices (BMPs) to control weeds may help delay resistance. BMPs include applying multiple herbicides with different modes of action, rotating crops, planting weed-free seed, scouting fields routinely, cleaning equipment to reduce the transmission of weeds to other fields, and maintaining field borders. The most widely planted GM crops are designed to tolerate herbicides. By 2006 some weed populations had evolved to tolerate some of the same herbicides. Palmer amaranth is a weed that competes with cotton. A native of the southwestern US, it traveled east and was first found resistant to glyphosate in 2006, less than 10 years after GM cotton was introduced. Over-reliance on glyphosate and a reduction in the diversity of weed management practices allowed the spread of glyphosate resistance in 14 weed species in the US, and in soybeans.

=== Plant protection ===
Farmers generally use less insecticide when they plant Bt-resistant crops. Insecticide use on corn farms declined from 0.21 pound per planted acre in 1995 to 0.02 pound in 2010. This is consistent with the decline in European corn borer populations as a direct result of Bt corn and cotton. The establishment of minimum refuge requirements helped delay the evolution of Bt resistance. However, resistance appears to be developing to some Bt traits in some areas. In Colombia, GM cotton has reduced insecticide usage by 25% and herbicide usage by 5%, and GM corn has reduced insecticide and herbicide usage by 66% and 13%, respectively.

=== Tillage ===
By leaving at least 30% of crop residue on the soil surface from harvest through planting, conservation tillage reduces soil erosion from wind and water, increases water retention, and reduces soil degradation as well as water and chemical runoff. In addition, conservation tillage reduces the carbon footprint of agriculture. A 2014 review covering 12 states from 1996 to 2006, found that a 1% increase in herbicde-tolerant (HT) soybean adoption leads to a 0.21% increase in conservation tillage and a 0.3% decrease in quality-adjusted herbicide use.

=== Greenhouse gas emissions ===
Combined features of increased yield, decreased land use, reduced use of fertilizer and reduced farming machinery use create a feedback loop that reduces carbon emissions related to farming. These reductions have been estimated at 7.5% of total agricultural emissions in the EU or 33 million tons of CO_{2} and an estimated 8.76 million tons of CO_{2} in Colombia.

=== Drought tolerance ===
The use of drought tolerant crops can increase yield in water-scarce locations, making farming possible in new areas. The adoption of drought tolerant maize in Ghana was shown to increase yield by more than 150% and boost commercialization intensity, although it did not significantly affect farm income.

== Regulation ==
The regulation of genetic engineering concerns the approaches taken by governments to assess and manage the risks associated with the development and release of genetically modified crops. There are differences in the regulation of GM crops between countries, with some of the most marked differences occurring between the US and Europe. Regulation varies in a given country depending on the intended use of each product. For example, a crop not intended for food use is generally not reviewed by authorities responsible for food safety.

== Production ==
GM crops production in the World (ISAAA Brief 2019) More than 10 million hectares Between 50,000 and 10 million hectares Less than 50,000 hectares No biotech crops

In 2013, GM crops were planted in 27 countries; 19 were developing countries and 8 were developed countries. 2013 was the second year in which developing countries grew a majority (54%) of the total GM harvest. 18 million farmers grew GM crops; around 90% were small-holding farmers in developing countries.

Country	2013– GM planted area (million hectares)	Biotech crops
US	70.1	Maize, Soybean, Cotton, Canola, Sugarbeet, Alfalfa, Papaya, Squash
Brazil	40.3	Soybean, Maize, Cotton
Argentina	24.4	Soybean, Maize, Cotton
India	11.0	Cotton
Canada	10.8	Canola, Maize, Soybean, Sugarbeet
Total	175.2	----

The United States Department of Agriculture (USDA) reports every year on the total area of GM crop varieties planted in the United States. According to National Agricultural Statistics Service, the states published in these tables represent 81–86 percent of all corn planted area, 88–90 percent of all soybean planted area, and 81–93 percent of all upland cotton planted area (depending on the year).

Global estimates are produced by the International Service for the Acquisition of Agri-biotech Applications (ISAAA) and can be found in their annual reports, "Global Status of Commercialized Transgenic Crops".

Farmers have widely adopted GM technology (see figure). Between 1996 and 2013, the total surface area of land cultivated with GM crops increased by a factor of 100, from 17,000 square kilometers (4,200,000 acres) to 1,750,000 km^{2} (432 million acres). 10% of the world's arable land was planted with GM crops in 2010. As of 2011, 11 different transgenic crops were grown commercially on 395 million acres (160 million hectares) in 29 countries such as the US, Brazil, Argentina, India, Canada, China, Paraguay, Pakistan, South Africa, Uruguay, Bolivia, Australia, Philippines, Myanmar, Burkina Faso, Mexico and Spain. One of the key reasons for this widespread adoption is the perceived economic benefit the technology brings to farmers. For example, the system of planting glyphosate-resistant seed and then applying glyphosate once plants emerged provided farmers with the opportunity to dramatically increase the yield from a given plot of land, since this allowed them to plant rows closer together. Without it, farmers had to plant rows far enough apart to control post-emergent weeds with mechanical tillage. Likewise, using Bt seeds means that farmers do not have to purchase insecticides, and then invest time, fuel, and equipment in applying them. However critics have disputed whether yields are higher and whether chemical use is less, with GM crops. See Genetically modified food controversies article for information.

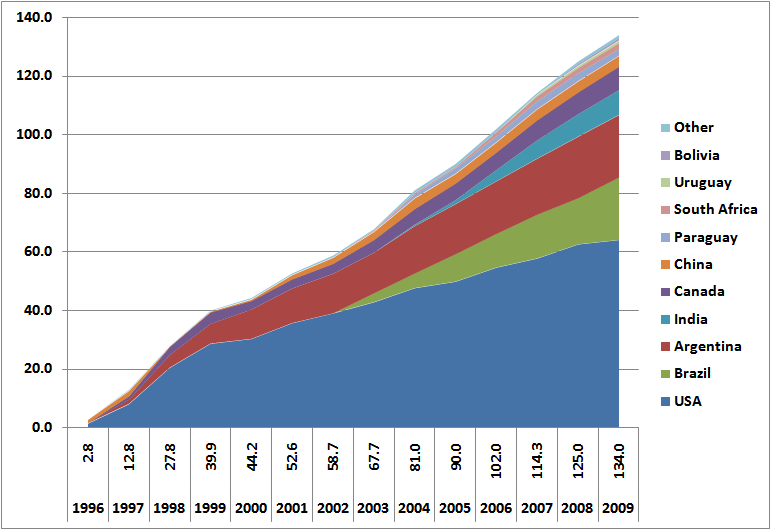
Land area used for genetically modified crops by country (1996–2009), in millions of hectares. In 2011, the land area used was 160 million hectares, or 1.6 million square kilometers.

In the US, by 2014, 94% of the planted area of soybeans, 96% of cotton and 93% of corn were genetically modified varieties. Genetically modified soybeans carried herbicide-tolerant traits only, but maize and cotton carried both herbicide tolerance and insect protection traits (the latter largely Bt protein). These constitute "input-traits" that are aimed to financially benefit the producers, but may have indirect environmental benefits and cost benefits to consumers. The Grocery Manufacturers of America estimated in 2003 that 70–75% of all processed foods in the U.S. contained a GM ingredient.

Europe grows relatively few genetically engineered crops with the exception of Spain, where one fifth of maize is genetically engineered, and smaller amounts in five other countries. The EU had a 'de facto' ban on the approval of new GM crops, from 1999 until 2004. GM crops are now regulated by the EU. Developing countries grew 54 percent of genetically engineered crops in 2013.

In recent years GM crops expanded rapidly in developing countries. In 2013 approximately 18 million farmers grew 54% of worldwide GM crops in developing countries. 2013's largest increase was in Brazil (403,000 km^{2} versus 368,000 km^{2} in 2012). GM cotton began growing in India in 2002, reaching 110,000 km^{2} in 2013.

According to the 2013 ISAAA brief: "a total of 36 countries (35 + EU-28) have granted regulatory approvals for biotech crops for food and/or feed use and for environmental release or planting since 1994 ... a total of 2,833 regulatory approvals involving 27 GM crops and 336 GM events (NB: an "event" is a specific genetic modification in a specific species) have been issued by authorities, of which 1,321 are for food use (direct use or processing), 918 for feed use (direct use or processing) and 599 for environmental release or planting. Japan has the largest number (198), followed by the U.S.A. (165, not including "stacked" events), Canada (146), Mexico (131), South Korea (103), Australia (93), New Zealand (83), European Union (71 including approvals that have expired or under renewal process), Philippines (68), Taiwan (65), Colombia (59), China (55) and South Africa (52). Maize has the largest number (130 events in 27 countries), followed by cotton (49 events in 22 countries), potato (31 events in 10 countries), canola (30 events in 12 countries) and soybean (27 events in 26 countries).

== Controversy ==
Direct genetic engineering has been controversial since its introduction. Most, but not all of the controversies are over GM foods rather than crops per se. GM foods are the subject of protests, vandalism, referendums, legislation, court action and scientific disputes. The controversies involve consumers, biotechnology companies, governmental regulators, non-governmental organizations and scientists.

Opponents have objected to GM crops on multiple grounds including environmental impacts, food safety, whether GM crops are needed to address food needs, whether they are sufficiently accessible to farmers in developing countries, concerns over subjecting crops to intellectual property law, and on religious grounds. Secondary issues include labeling, the behavior of government regulators, the effects of pesticide use and pesticide tolerance.

A significant environmental concern about using genetically modified crops is possible cross-breeding with related crops, giving them advantages over naturally occurring varieties. One example is a glyphosate-resistant rice crop that crossbreeds with a weedy relative, giving the weed a competitive advantage. The transgenic hybrid had higher rates of photosynthesis, more shoots and flowers, and more seeds than the non-transgenic hybrids. This demonstrates the possibility of ecosystem damage by GM crop usage.

The role of biopiracy in the development of GM crops is also potentially problematic, as developed countries have gotten economic gain by using the genetic resources of developing countries. In the twentieth century, the International Rice Research Institute catalogued the genomes of almost 80,000 varieties of rice from Asian farms, which has since been used to create new higher yielding varieties of rice. These new varieties create almost 655 million dollars of economic gain for Australia, USA, Canada, and New Zealand every year.

There is a scientific consensus that currently available food derived from GM crops poses no greater risk to human health than conventional food, but that each GM food needs to be tested on a case-by-case basis before introduction. Nonetheless, members of the public are much less likely than scientists to perceive GM foods as safe. The legal and regulatory status of GM foods varies by country, with some nations banning or restricting them, and others permitting them with widely differing degrees of regulation.

No reports of ill effects from GM food have been documented in the human population. GM crop labeling is required in many countries, although the United States Food and Drug Administration does not, nor does it distinguish between approved GM and non-GM foods. The United States enacted a law that requires labeling regulations to be issued by July 2018. It allows indirect disclosure such as with a phone number, bar code, or web site.

Advocacy groups such as Center for Food Safety, Union of Concerned Scientists, and Greenpeace claim that risks related to GM food have not been adequately examined and managed, that GM crops are not sufficiently tested and should be labelled, and that regulatory authorities and scientific bodies are too closely tied to industry. Some studies have claimed that genetically modified crops can cause harm; a 2016 review that reanalyzed the data from six of these studies found that their statistical methodologies were flawed and did not demonstrate harm, and said that conclusions about GM crop safety should be drawn from "the totality of the evidence ... instead of far-fetched evidence from single studies".

== See also ==
- Food security
- Plant-produced beta-casein
