= Center for Food Safety =

US non-profit organization

- Abbreviation: CFS
- Founded at: Washington, D.C.
- Type: 501(c)(3) non-profit
- Location: San Francisco, California; Portland, Oregon
- Website: www.centerforfoodsafety.org

The Center for Food Safety (CFS) is a 501(c)(3), U.S. non-profit advocacy organization, based in Washington, D.C. It maintains offices in San Francisco, California, and Portland, Oregon. CFS describes itself as an organization that empowers people, supports farmers, and protects the earth from the harmful impacts of industrial agriculture through legal, scientific, and grassroots action. The organization was founded in 1997.

== Work ==
The Center for Food Safety has been an associated party in challenges against the planting of genetically modified crops in the US.

=== Alfalfa ===
In April, 2004, Monsanto petitioned the Animal and Plant Health Inspection Service (APHIS) for deregulation of their product Roundup Ready Alfalfa (RRA). After performing an Environmental Assessment, APHIS deregulated the product in 2005. In 2006, this decision was challenged by Geertson Seed Farms and other parties, including the Center for Food Safety. This led to a decision by the US District Court of San Francisco to suspend the deregulated status of RRA and place an injunction on the sale and planting of RRA until the completion of an Environmental Impact Statement.

The US Supreme Court reversed the District Court decision in 2010, in the case of Monsanto Co. v. Geertson Seed Farms. This 7–1 decision in favor of Monsanto Company declared the injunction against RRA invalid, allowing the sale and planting of the product; it did not, however, restore the deregulated status of the crop. Upon completion of the Environmental Impact Statement, RRA was officially deregulated in January 2011.

The Center for Food Safety also launched a separate lawsuit against RRA in the case Center for Food Safety v. Vilsack, in October, 2012. The CFS alleged that RRA had been improperly reviewed by APHIS, arguing that it should be considered a "Plant Pest" under the Plant Protection Act. In 2013 the United States District Court of San Francisco issued a ruling for the case in favor of the defendant, Thomas Vilsack, Secretary of APHIS.

=== Sugar beets ===
In 2009–2010, the United States District Court for the Northern District of California was considering a case involving the planting of genetically modified sugar beets. The case involved Monsanto's breed of pesticide-resistant sugar beets. The lawsuit was also organized by Center for Food Safety.

Earlier in 2010, Judge Jeffrey S. White allowed the planting of GM sugar beets to continue, but he also warned that this may be blocked in the future while an environmental review was taking place. Finally, on 13 August 2010, Judge White ordered the halt to the planting of the genetically modified sugar beets in the US. He indicated that "the Agriculture Department had not adequately assessed the environmental consequences before approving them for commercial cultivation". This decision was reversed in 2011, with the appellate court citing studies that indicated that there was no molecular difference between sugar produced by the GMO and non-GMO variants of sugar beets.

=== Iowa Skipper Butterfly ===
In March 2023, the organization petitioned federal agencies to list the Iowa Skipper Butterfly as an endangered species due to agriculture, commercial pesticide spraying, climate change, and invasive species. After several delayed deadlines, the organization filed a notice of intent to sue.

== Criticism ==
The Center for Global Food Issues (CGFI), claims that in one case, Kimbrell was said to have released a baseless food poisoning scare in The Wall Street Journal, following a request to exempt Monsanto from recalling of canola oil from seed with a not yet US approved gene, (although approved in Canada) found in small quantities in their oil, after deciding to concentrate on a different gene that had similar results.
