= Genetically modified canola =

Genetically modified crop

The very first strain of a genetically modified version of canola, Roundup Ready canola, was developed by Monsanto for tolerance to glyphosate, the active ingredient in the commonly used herbicide Roundup.

== Genetic modification ==
Glyphosate is a broad-spectrum herbicide, which is used to kill weeds and grasses which are known to compete with commercial crops grown around the world. The first product came onto the market in the 1970s under the name ‘Roundup’. Plants which are exposed to glyphosate are unable to produce aromatic amino acids and in turn die.

To produce the Roundup Ready canola, two genes were introduced into the canola genome. One is a gene derived from the common soil bacterium Agrobacterium strain CP4, that encodes for the EPSPS enzyme. The other is a gene from the Brucella anthropi strain LBAA, which encodes for the enzyme glyphosate oxidase (GOX). The CP4 EPSPS enzyme imparts high tolerance to glyphosate, so the plants can still create aromatic amino acids even after glyphosate is applied. GOX helps break down glyphosate within the plant.

== Regulation ==
Genetically modified crops undergo a significant amount of regulation throughout the world.

For a GM crop to be approved for release in the US, it must be assessed by the Animal and Plant Health Inspection Service (APHIS) agency within the US Department of Agriculture (USDA) and may also be assessed by the Food and Drug Administration (FDA) and the Environmental Protection Agency (EPA), depending on the intended use. The USDA evaluates the plant's potential to become a weed. The FDA regulates crops used as food or animal feed. In Canada, the largest producer of GM canola, GM crops are regulated by Health Canada, under the Food and Drugs Act, and the Canadian Food Inspection Agency are responsible for evaluating the safety and nutritional value of genetically modified foods. Environmental assessments of biotechnology-derived plants are carried out by the CFIA's Plant Biosafety Office (PBO). Glyphosate- and glufosinate-tolerant canola were the first two GM plants to gain approval in Canada. In Australia Roundup Ready Canola was approved for commercial production in 2003 by the Gene Technology Regulator after undergoing approximately 400 tests and studies to determine it was safe. Food Standards Australia New Zealand also approved this product as being safe for human consumption in the same year.

== Controversy ==
Controversy exists over the use of food and other goods derived from genetically modified crops instead of from conventional crops, and other uses of genetic engineering in food production. The dispute involves consumers, biotechnology companies, governmental regulators, nongovernmental organizations, and scientists. The key areas of controversy related to GMO foods are whether they should be labeled, the role of government regulators, the objectivity of scientific research and publication, the effect of GM crops on health and the environment, the effect on pesticide resistance, the impact of GM crops for farmers, and the role of GM crops in feeding the world population.

There is a scientific consensus that currently available food derived from GM crops poses no greater risk to human health than conventional food, but that each GM food needs to be tested on a case-by-case basis before introduction. Nonetheless, members of the public are much less likely than scientists to perceive GM foods as safe. The legal and regulatory status of GM foods varies by country, with some nations banning or restricting them, and others permitting them with widely differing degrees of regulation.

Advocacy groups such as Greenpeace, the Non-GMO Project, and Organic Consumers Association say that risks of GM food have not been adequately identified and managed, and have questioned the objectivity of regulatory authorities. They have expressed concerns about the objectivity of regulators and rigor of the regulatory process, about contamination of the non-GM food supply, about effects of GMOs on the environment and nature, and about the consolidation of control of the food supply in companies that make and sell GMOs.

== Resistances problems ==
Due to the heavy reliance of glyphosate in agriculture, resistance to this chemical is a problem and is prevalent throughout Australia, the US, and Canada.

Roundup canola has also emerged as a weed in other crops due to its glyphosate resistance. This is due to canola seed being able to be dormant in the soil for up to 10 years. In California, it has become a significant problem in this way because of the restrictions on phenoxy herbicides being used in the state due to crops such as the sensitivity of cotton and grapes to this chemical.
