= Genetically modified soybean =

Soybean that has had DNA introduced into it using genetic engineering techniques

A genetically modified soybean is a soybean (Glycine max) that has had DNA introduced into it using genetic engineering techniques. In 1996, the first genetically modified soybean was introduced to the U.S. by Monsanto. In 2014, 90.7 million hectares of GM soybeans were planted worldwide, making up 82% of the total soybeans cultivation area.

== Examples of transgenic soybeans ==
The genetic makeup of a soybean gives it a wide variety of uses, thus keeping it in high demand. First, manufacturers only wanted to use transgenics to be able to grow more soybeans at a minimal cost to meet this demand, and to fix any problems in the growing process, but they eventually found they could modify the soybean to contain healthier components, or even focus on one aspect of the soybean to produce in larger quantities. These phases became known as the first and second generation of genetically modified (GM) foods. As Peter Celec describes, "benefits of the first generation of GM foods were oriented towards the production process and companies, the second generation of GM foods offers, on contrary, various advantages and added value for the consumer", including "improved nutritional composition or even therapeutic effects."

=== Roundup Ready Soybean ===
Roundup Ready soybeans (The first variety was also known as GTS 40-3-2 (OECD UI: MON-04032-6)) are a series of genetically engineered varieties of glyphosate-resistant soybeans produced by Monsanto.

Glyphosate kills plants by interfering with the synthesis of the essential amino acids phenylalanine, tyrosine and tryptophan. These amino acids are called "essential" because animals cannot make them; only plants and micro-organisms can make them and animals obtain them by eating plants.

Plants and microorganisms make these amino acids with an enzyme that only plants and lower organisms have, called 5-enolpyruvylshikimate-3-phosphate synthase (EPSPS). EPSPS is not present in animals, which instead obtain aromatic amino acids from their diet.

Roundup Ready Soybeans express a version of EPSPS from the CP4 strain of the bacteria Agrobacterium tumefaciens, expression of which is regulated by an enhanced 35S promoter (E35S) from cauliflower mosaic virus (CaMV), a chloroplast transit peptide (CTP4) coding sequence from Petunia hybrida, and a nopaline synthase (nos 3') transcriptional termination element from Agrobacterium tumefaciens. The plasmid with EPSPS and the other genetic elements mentioned above was inserted into soybean germplasm with a gene gun by scientists at Monsanto and Asgrow. The patent on the first generation of Roundup Ready soybeans expired in March 2015.

==== History ====
First approved commercially in the United States during 1994, GTS 40-3-2 was subsequently introduced to Canada in 1995, Japan and Argentina in 1996, Uruguay in 1997, Mexico and Brazil in 1998, and South Africa in 2001. GMO Soybean is also approved by the United Nations in 1999.

The Chinese Ministry of Agriculture announced on April 29, 2022, the approval of the drought-tolerant event, called HB4.

==== Detection ====
GTS 40-3-2 can be detected using both nucleic acid and protein analysis methods.

=== Generic GMO soybeans ===
Following expiration of Monsanto's patent on the first variety of glyphosate-resistant Roundup Ready soybeans, development began on glyphosate-resistant generic soybeans. The first variety, developed at the University of Arkansas Division of Agriculture, came to the market in 2015. With a slightly lower yield than newer Monsanto varieties, it costs about 1/2 as much, and seeds can be saved for subsequent years. According to its innovator, it is adapted to conditions in Arkansas. Several other varieties are being bred by crossing the original variety of Roundup Ready soybeans with other soybean varieties.

=== HB4 Soybean ===
HB4 soybean, whose technical name is IND-ØØ41Ø-5 soybean, is a variety produced through genetic engineering to respond efficiently to drought conditions.

The HB4 soybean was created to more efficiently tolerate abiotic stress such as drought or hypersaline conditions. These characteristics result in increased yield compared to unmodified varieties. In 2015, HB4 soybean was approved in Argentina, then in Brazil (May 2019), the United States (August 2019), Paraguay (2019), Canada (2021) and the People's Republic of China (2022).

=== Stacked traits ===
Monsanto developed a glyphosate-resistant soybean that also expresses Cry1Ac protein from Bacillus thuringiensis and the glyphosate-resistance gene, which completed the Brazilian regulatory process in 2010. This is a cross of two events, MON87701 x MON89788. In 2016, as a response to the growth of glyphosate resistant weeds, Monsanto introduced Roundup Ready Xtend soybeans, a stacked-trait soybean modified to tolerate both dicamba and glyphosate. Xtend soybeans were planted on 1 million acres in 2016, and by 2020 were projected to be planted on 50 million acres. In 2021, Bayer's "XtendFlex" soybeans with resistance to dicamba, glyphosate and glufosinate, entered into full-scale commercial use in the United States.

=== Genetic modification to improve soybean oil ===
Soybean has been genetically modified to improve the quality of soy oil. Soy oil has a fatty acid profile that makes it susceptible to oxidation, which makes it rancid, which limits its usefulness in the food industry. Genetic modifications increased the amount of oleic acid and stearic acid and decreased the amount of linolenic acid. By silencing, or knocking out, the delta 9 and delta 12 desaturases. DuPont Pioneer created a high oleic fatty acid soybean with levels of oleic acid greater than 80%, and started marketing it in 2010.

== Regulation ==
The regulation of genetic engineering concerns the approaches taken by governments to assess and manage the risks associated with the development and release of genetically modified crops. There are differences in the regulation of GM crops between countries, with some of the most marked differences occurring between the US and Europe. In the US, the American Soybean Association (ASA) is generally in favor of allowing new GM soy varieties. The ASA especially supports separate regulation of transgenics and all other techniques. Soy beans are allowed a Maximum Residue Limit of glyphosate of 20 milligrams per kilogram (9.1 mg/lb) for international trade. Regulation varies in a given country depending on the intended use of the products of the genetic engineering. For example, a crop not intended for food use is generally not reviewed by authorities responsible for food safety. Romania authorised GM soy for cultivation and use but then imposed a ban upon entry into the EU in 2007. This resulted in an immediate withdrawal of 70% of the soybean hectares in 2008 and a trade deficit of €117.4m for purchase of replacement products. Farmer sentiment was very much in favour of relegalisation.

== Controversy ==
There is a scientific consensus that currently available food derived from GM crops poses no greater risk to human health than conventional food, but that each GM food needs to be tested on a case-by-case basis before introduction. Nonetheless, members of the public are much less likely than scientists to perceive GM foods as safe. The legal and regulatory status of GM foods varies by country, with some nations banning or restricting them, and others permitting them with widely differing degrees of regulation.

A 2010 study found that in the United States, GM crops also provide a number of environmental benefits.

Critics have objected to GM crops on several grounds, including ecological concerns, and economic concerns raised by the fact that these organisms are subject to intellectual property law. GM crops also are involved in controversies over GM food with respect to whether food produced from GM crops are safe and whether GM crops are needed to address the world's food needs. See the genetically modified food controversies article for discussion of issues about GM crops and GM food. These controversies have led to litigation, international trade disputes, and protests, and to restrictive legislation in most countries.

== See also ==
- Vistive Gold
