= Roundup Ready =

Trademark for genetically modified crop seeds

Logo of Roundup Ready for genetically modified canola

Roundup Ready is the Bayer (formerly Monsanto) trademark for its patented line of genetically modified crop seeds that are resistant to its glyphosate-based herbicide, Roundup. The products have become so commonplace that trademark is occasionally used eponymously for any genetically modified herbicide resistance, regardless of actual product.

== History ==
In 1996, genetically modified Roundup Ready soybeans resistant to Roundup became commercially available, followed by Roundup Ready corn in 1998. Current Roundup Ready crops include soy, corn (maize), canola, sugar beets, cotton, and alfalfa, with wheat still under development. Additional information on Roundup Ready crops is available on the GM Crops List. As of 2005, 87% of U.S. soybean fields were planted with glyphosate resistant varieties.

The use of glyphosate has led to the evolution of glyphosate resistant weeds. Although the number of glyphosate resistant weeds is low, the number of glyphosate resistant weed species is quickly growing, thus posing concerns for farmers who have relied on Roundup Ready seeds for weed control.

In 2016, as a response to the growth of glyphosate resistant weeds, Monsanto introduced Roundup Ready Xtend soybeans, modified to tolerate both dicamba and glyphosate. Xtend soybeans were planted on 1 million acres in 2016, and by 2020 were projected to be planted on 50 million acres. In 2021, Bayer's "XtendFlex" soybeans with resistance to dicamba, glyphosate and glufosinate, entered into full-scale commercial use in the United States.

While the use of Roundup Ready crops has increased the usage of herbicides measured in pounds applied per acre, it has also changed the herbicide use profile away from atrazine, metribuzin, and alachlor which are more likely to be present in run off water. Furthermore, because glyphosate can be sprayed directly on Roundup Ready crops during the growing season, farmers using these seeds are less likely to intensively till and spray their fields in the off-season, thus reducing soil erosion and labor costs, and increasing soil moisture.

An injunction in the case of Center for Food Safety v. USDA in September 2010 prevented farmers from planting Roundup Ready sugar beets across the United States until a remedial environmental impact report could be filed, prompting some fear of a sugar shortage. The USDA completed an environmental impact study of Roundup Ready sugar beets in 2012 and concluded that they are safe, at which time they were deregulated.

== Patents ==
The US patent for Roundup Ready soybeans expired in 2014. The US patent for Roundup Ready canola expired on 26 April 2022. The 2020 film Percy is based on Canadian farmer Percy Schmeiser's legal battle against Monsanto over the Roundup Ready canola patent.

== Genetic engineering ==
Some microorganisms have a version of 5-enolpyruvylshikimate-3-phosphate synthase (EPSPS: EC 2.5.1.19, 3-phosphoshikimate 1-carboxyvinyltransferase; 5-enolpyruvylshikimate-3-phosphate synthetase; phosphoenolpyruvate:3-phosphoshikimate 5-O-(1-carboxyvinyl)-transferase) that is resistant to glyphosate inhibition. The version used in genetically modified crops was isolated from Agrobacterium strain CP4 (CP4 EPSPS) that was resistant to glyphosate. The CP4 EPSPS gene was cloned and inserted into soybeans. The CP4 EPSPS gene was engineered for plant expression by fusing the 5' end of the gene to a chloroplast transit peptide derived from the petunia EPSPS. This transit peptide was used because it had shown previously an ability to deliver bacterial EPSPS to the chloroplasts of other plants. The plasmid used to move the gene into soybeans was PV-GMGTO4. It contained three bacterial genes, two CP4 EPSPS genes, and a gene encoding beta-glucuronidase (GUS) from Escherichia coli as a marker. The DNA was injected into the soybeans using the particle-acceleration method or "gene gun". Soybean cultivar A54O3 was used for the transformation. The expression of the GUS gene was used as the initial evidence of transformation. GUS expression was detected by a staining method in which the GUS enzyme converts a substrate into a blue precipitate. Those plants that showed GUS expression were then taken and sprayed with glyphosate and their tolerance was tested over many generations.

== Productivity claims ==
Under conditions meant to reveal only genetic yield factors, Roundup Ready lines have been shown to have worse yields. In 1999, a review of Roundup Ready soybean crops found that, compared to the top conventional varieties, they had a 6.7% lower yield. This so-called "yield drag" follows the same pattern observed when other traits are introduced into soybeans by conventional breeding. Monsanto claims later patented varieties yield 7-11% higher than their initial varieties, closer to those of conventional farming, although the company refrains from citing actual yields. Monsanto's 2006 application to the USDA states that RR2 (mon89788) yields 1.6 bu less than A3244, the conventional variety that the trait is inserted into.

Many genetically engineered crops have similar yield alterations. Roundup Ready crops have both: yield drag due to the modification itself interfering with yield production; and yield lag due to the delay in breeding the best new yield genetics into the Roundup Ready lines.

Because this kind of testing is done under artificial conditions, these results do not hold for actual field conditions with weed pressure. Under realistic field use the weed control advantages are more significant.

== See also ==
- Roundup Ready soybeans
- LibertyLink
