= Pharming (genetics) =

Genetic engineering to produce pharmaceuticals

Pharming, a portmanteau of farming and pharmaceutical, refers to the use of genetic engineering to insert genes that code for useful pharmaceuticals into host animals or plants that would otherwise not express those genes, thus creating a genetically modified organism (GMO). Pharming is also known as molecular farming, molecular pharming, or biopharming.

The products of pharming are recombinant proteins or their metabolic products. Recombinant proteins are most commonly produced using bacteria or yeast in a bioreactor, but pharming offers the advantage to the producer that it does not require expensive infrastructure, and production capacity can be quickly scaled to meet demand, at greatly reduced cost.

== History ==
The first recombinant plant-derived protein (PDP) was human serum albumin, initially produced in 1990 in transgenic tobacco and potato plants. Open field growing trials of these crops began in the United States in 1992 and have taken place every year since. While the United States Department of Agriculture has approved planting of pharma crops in every state, most testing has taken place in Hawaii, Nebraska, Iowa, and Wisconsin.

In the early 2000s, the pharming industry was robust. Proof of concept has been established for the production of many therapeutic proteins, including antibodies, blood products, cytokines, growth factors, hormones, recombinant enzymes and human and veterinary vaccines. By 2003 several PDP products for the treatment of human diseases were under development by nearly 200 biotech companies, including recombinant gastric lipase for the treatment of cystic fibrosis, and antibodies for the prevention of dental caries and the treatment of non-Hodgkin's lymphoma.

However, in late 2002, just as ProdiGene was ramping up production of trypsin for commercial launch it was discovered that volunteer plants (left over from the prior harvest) of one of their GM corn products were harvested with the conventional soybean crop later planted in that field. ProdiGene was fined $250,000 and ordered by the USDA to pay over $3 million in cleanup costs. This raised a furor and set the pharming field back, dramatically. Many companies went bankrupt as companies faced difficulties getting permits for field trials and investors fled. In reaction, APHIS introduced more strict regulations for pharming field trials in the US in 2003. In 2005, Anheuser-Busch threatened to boycott rice grown in Missouri because of plans by Ventria Bioscience to grow pharm rice in the state. A compromise was reached, but Ventria withdrew its permit to plant in Missouri due to unrelated circumstances.

The industry has slowly recovered, by focusing on pharming in simple plants grown in bioreactors and on growing GM crops in greenhouses. Some companies and academic groups have continued with open-field trials of GM crops that produce drugs. In 2006 Dow AgroSciences received USDA approval to market a vaccine for poultry against Newcastle disease, produced in plant cell culture – the first plant-produced vaccine approved in the U.S.

== In mammals ==
=== Historical development ===
Milk is presently the most mature system to produce recombinant proteins from transgenic organisms. Blood, egg white, seminal plasma, and urine are other theoretically possible systems, but all have drawbacks. Blood, for instance, as of 2012 cannot store high levels of stable recombinant proteins, and biologically active proteins in blood may alter the health of the animals. Expression in the milk of a mammal, such as a cow, sheep, or goat, is a common application, as milk production is plentiful and purification from milk is relatively easy. Hamsters and rabbits have also been used in preliminary studies because of their faster breeding.

One approach to this technology is the creation of a transgenic mammal that can produce the biopharmaceutical in its milk (or blood or urine). Once an animal is produced, typically using the pronuclear microinjection method, it becomes efficacious to use cloning technology to create additional offspring that carry the favorable modified genome. In February 2009 the US FDA granted marketing approval for the first drug to be produced in genetically modified livestock. The drug is called ATryn, which is antithrombin protein purified from the milk of genetically modified goats. Marketing permission was granted by the European Medicines Agency in August 2006.

=== Patentability issues ===
As indicated above, some mammals typically used for food production (such as goats, sheep, pigs, and cows) have been modified to produce non-food products, a practice sometimes called pharming. Use of genetically modified goats has been approved by the FDA and EMA to produce ATryn, i.e. recombinant antithrombin, an anticoagulant protein drug. These products "produced by turning animals into drug-manufacturing 'machines' by genetically modifying them" are sometimes termed biopharmaceuticals.

The patentability of such biopharmaceuticals and their process of manufacture is uncertain. Probably, the biopharmaceuticals themselves so made are unpatentable, assuming that they are chemically identical to the preexisting drugs that they imitate. Several 19th-century United States Supreme Court decisions hold that a previously known natural product manufactured by artificial means cannot be patented. An argument can be made for the patentability of the process for manufacturing a biopharmaceutical, however, because genetically modifying animals so that they will produce the drug is dissimilar to previous methods of manufacture; moreover, one Supreme Court decision seems to hold open that possibility.

On the other hand, it has been suggested that the recent Supreme Court decision in Mayo v. Prometheus may create a problem in that, in accordance with the ruling in that case, "it may be said that such and such genes manufacture this protein in the same way they always did in a mammal, they produce the same product, and the genetic modification technology used is conventional, so that the steps of the process 'add nothing to the laws of nature that is not already present. If the argument prevailed in court, the process would also be ineligible for patent protection. This issue has not yet been decided in the courts.

== In plants ==
Plant-made pharmaceuticals (PMPs), also referred to as pharming, is a sub-sector of the biotechnology industry that involves the process of genetically engineering plants so that they can produce certain types of therapeutically important proteins and associated molecules such as peptides and secondary metabolites. The proteins and molecules can then be harvested and used to produce pharmaceuticals.

Arabidopsis is often used as a model organism to study gene expression in plants, while actual production may be carried out in maize, rice, potatoes, tobacco, flax or safflower. Tobacco has been a highly popular choice of organism for the expression of transgenes, as it is easily transformed, produces abundant tissues, and survives well in vitro and in greenhouses. The advantage of rice and flax is that they are self-pollinating, and thus gene flow issues (see below) are avoided. However, human error could still result in modified crops entering the food supply. Using a minor crop such as safflower or tobacco avoids the greater political pressures and risk to the food supply involved with using staple crops such as beans or rice. Expression of proteins in plant cell or hairy root cultures also minimizes risk of gene transfer, but at a higher cost of production. Sterile hybrids may also be used for the bioconfinement of transgenic plants, although stable lines cannot be established. Grain crops are sometimes chosen for pharming because protein products targeted to the endosperm of cereals have been shown to have high heat stability. This characteristic makes them an appealing target for the production of edible vaccines, as viral coat proteins stored in grains do not require cold storage the way many vaccines currently do. Maintaining a temperature controlled supply chain of vaccines is often difficult when delivering vaccines to developing countries.

Most commonly, plant transformation is carried out using Agrobacterium tumefaciens. The protein of interest is often expressed under the control of the cauliflower mosaic virus 35S promoter (CaMV35S), a powerful constitutive promoter for driving expression in plants. Localization signals may be attached to the protein of interest to cause accumulation to occur in a specific sub-cellular location, such as chloroplasts or vacuoles. This is done in order to improve yields, simplify purification, or so that the protein folds properly. Recently, the inclusion of antisense genes in expression cassettes has been shown to have potential for improving the plant pharming process. Researchers in Japan transformed rice with an antisense SPK gene, which disrupts starch accumulation in rice seeds, so that products would accumulate in a watery sap that is easier to purify.

Recently, several non-crop plants such as the duckweed Lemna minor or the moss Physcomitrella patens have shown to be useful for the production of biopharmaceuticals. These frugal organisms can be cultivated in bioreactors (as opposed to being grown in fields), secrete the transformed proteins into the growth medium and, thus, substantially reduce the burden of protein purification in preparing recombinant proteins for medical use. In addition, both species can be engineered to cause secretion of proteins with human patterns of glycosylation, an improvement over conventional plant gene-expression systems. Biolex Therapeutics developed a duckweed-based expression platform; it sold the business to Synthon and declared bankruptcy in 2012.

Additionally, an Israeli company, Protalix, has developed a method to produce therapeutics in cultured transgenic carrot or tobacco cells. Protalix and its partner, Pfizer, received FDA approval to market its drug, taliglucerase alfa (Elelyso), as a treatment for Gaucher's disease, in 2012.

== Regulation ==
The regulation of genetic engineering concerns the approaches taken by governments to assess and manage the risks associated with the development and release of genetically modified crops. There are differences in the regulation of GM crops – including those used for pharming – between countries, with some of the most marked differences occurring between the US and Europe. Regulation varies in a given country depending on the intended use of the products of the genetic engineering. For example, a crop not intended for food use is generally not reviewed by authorities responsible for food safety.

== Controversy ==
There are controversies around GMOs generally on several levels, including whether making them is ethical, issues concerning intellectual property and market dynamics; environmental effects of GM crops; and GM crops' role in industrial agricultural more generally. There are also specific controversies around pharming.

=== Advantages ===
Plants do not carry pathogens that might be dangerous to human health. Additionally, on the level of pharmacologically active proteins, there are no proteins in plants that are similar to human proteins. On the other hand, plants are still sufficiently closely related to animals and humans that they are able to correctly process and configure both animal and human proteins. Their seeds and fruits also provide sterile packaging containers for the valuable therapeutics and guarantee a certain storage life.

Global demand for pharmaceuticals is at unprecedented levels. Expanding the existing microbial systems, although feasible for some therapeutic products, is not a satisfactory option on several grounds. Many proteins of interest are too complex to be made by microbial systems or by protein synthesis. These proteins are currently being produced in animal cell cultures, but the resulting product is often prohibitively expensive for many patients. For these reasons, science has been exploring other options for producing proteins of therapeutic value.

These pharmaceutical crops could become extremely beneficial in developing countries. The World Health Organization estimates that nearly 3 million people die each year from vaccine preventable disease, mostly in Africa. Diseases such as measles and hepatitis lead to deaths in countries where the people cannot afford the high costs of vaccines, but pharm crops could help solve this problem.

=== Disadvantages ===
While molecular farming is one application of genetic engineering, there are concerns that are unique to it. In the case of genetically modified (GM) foods, concerns focus on the safety of the food for human consumption. In response, it has been argued that the genes that enhance a crop in some way, such as drought resistance or pesticide resistance, are not believed to affect the food itself. Other GM foods in development, such as fruits designed to ripen faster or grow larger, are believed not to affect humans any differently from non-GM varieties.

In contrast, molecular farming is not intended for crops destined for the food chain. It produces plants that contain physiologically active compounds that accumulate in the plant's tissues. Considerable attention is focused, therefore, on the restraint and caution necessary to protect both consumer health and environmental biodiversity.

The fact that the plants are used to produce drugs alarms activists. They worry that once production begins, the altered plants might find their way into the food supply or cross-pollinate with conventional, non-GM crops. These concerns have historical validation from the ProdiGene incident, and from the StarLink incident, in which GMO corn accidentally ended up in commercial food products. Activists also are concerned about the power of business. According to the Canadian Food Inspection Agency, in a recent report, says that U.S. demand alone for biotech pharmaceuticals is expanding at 13 percent annually and to reach a market value of $28.6 billion in 2004. Pharming is expected to be worth $100 billion globally by 2020.

== List of originators (companies and universities), research projects and products ==
Please note that this list is by no means exhaustive.

- Dow AgroSciences – poultry vaccine against Newcastle disease virus (first PMP to be approved for marketing by the USDA Center for Veterinary Biologics Dow never intended to market the vaccine. "'Dow Agrosciences used the animal vaccine as an example to completely run through the process. A new platform needs to be approved, which can be difficult when authorities get in contact with it for the first time', explains the plant physiologist Stefan Schillberg, head of the Molecular Biology Division at the Fraunhofer Institute for Molecular Biology and Applied Ecology Aachen."
- Fraunhofer Institute for Molecular Biology and Applied Ecology, with sites in Germany, the US, and Chile is the lead institute of the Pharma Planta consortium of 33 partner organizations from 12 European countries and South Africa, funded by the European Commission. Pharma Planta is developing systems for plant production of proteins in greenhouses in the European regulatory framework. It is collaborating on biosimilars with Plantform and PharmaPraxis (see below).
- Genzyme – antithrombin III in goat milk
- GTC Biotherapeutics – ATryn (recombinant human antithrombin) in goat milk
- Icon Genetics produces therapeutics in transiently infected Nicotiana benthamiana (relative of tobacco) plants in greenhouses in Halle, Germany or in fields. First product is a vaccine for a cancer, non-Hodgkin's lymphoma.
- Iowa State University – immunogenic protein from E. coli bacteria in pollen-free corn as a potential vaccine against E. coli for animals and humans
- Kentucky Bioprocessing took over Large Scale Biology's facilities in Owensboro, Kentucky, and offers contract biomanufacturing services in tobacco plants, grown in greenhouses or in open fields.
- Medicago Inc. – Pre-clinical trials of Influenza vaccine made in transiently infected Nicotiana benthamiana (relative of tobacco) plants in greenhouses. Medicago grew virus-like particles in the Australian weed Nicotiana benthamiana, for development of a candidate vaccine against the COVID-19 virus, initiating a Phase I clinical trial in July 2020.
- PharmaPraxis – Developing biosimilars in collaboration with PlantForm (see below) and Fraunhofer.
- Pharming – C1 inhibitor, human collagen 1, fibrinogen (with American Red Cross), and lactoferrin in cow milk The intellectual property behind the fibrinogen project was acquired from PPL Therapeutics when PPL went bankrupt in 2004.
- Phyton Biotech uses plant cell culture systems to manufacture active pharmaceutical ingredients based on taxanes, including paclitaxel and docetaxel
- Planet Biotechnology – antibodies against Streptococcus mutans, antibodies against doxorubicin, and ICAM 1 receptor in tobacco
- PlantForm Corporation – biosimilar trastuzumab in tobacco – It is developing biosimilars in collaboration with PharmaPraxis (see above) and Fraunhofer.
- ProdiGene – was developing several proteins, including aprotinin, trypsin and a veterinary TGE vaccine in corn. Was in process of launching trypsin product in 2002 when later that year its field test crops contaminated conventional crops. Unable to pay the $3 million cost of the cleanup, it was purchased by International Oilseed Distributors in 2003 International Oilseed Distributors is controlled by Harry H. Stine, who owns one of the biggest soybeans genetics companies in the US. ProdiGene's maize-produced trypsin, with the trademark TrypZean is currently sold by Sigma-Aldritch as a research reagent.
- Syngenta – Beta carotene in rice (this is "Golden rice 2"), which Syngenta has donated to the Golden Rice Project
- Arizona State University – Hepatitis C vaccine in potatoes
- Ventria Bioscience – lactoferrin and lysozyme in rice
- Washington State University – lactoferrin and lysozyme in barley
- European COST Action on Molecular Farming – COST Action FA0804 on Molecular Farming provides a pan-European coordination centre, connecting academic and government institutions and companies from 23 countries. The aim of the Action is to advance the field by encouraging scientific interactions, providing expert opinion and encouraging commercial development of new products. The COST Action also provides grants allowing young scientists to visit participating laboratories across Europe for scientific training.
- Mapp Biopharmaceutical in San Diego, California, was reported in August 2014 to be developing ZMapp, an experimental cure for the deadly Ebola virus disease. Two Americans who had been infected in Liberia were reported to be improving with the drug. ZMapp was made using antibodies produced by GM tobacco plants.

Projects known to be abandoned

- Agragen, in collaboration with University of Alberta – docosahexaenoic acid and human serum albumin in flax
- Chlorogen, Inc. – cholera, anthrax, and plague vaccines, albumin, interferon for liver diseases including hepatitis C, elastin, 4HB, and insulin-like growth factor in tobacco chloroplasts. Went out of business in 2007.
- Dow Chemical Company made a deal with Sunol Molecular in 2003 to develop antibodies against tissue factor in plants and in mammalian cell culture and to compare them. In 2005 Sunol sold all its tissue factor antagonists to Tanox, which in turn was bought by Genentech in 2003. Genentech licensed the tissue factor program to Altor in 2008 Altor is itself a spinout from Sunol. The product under development, ALT-836, formerly known as TNX-832 and Sunol-cH36, is not the plant-produced antibody, but rather is a mammalian antibody, more specifically, a chimeric antibody produced in a hybridoma.
- Epicyte – spermicidal antibodies in corn Epicyte was purchased by Biolex in 2004 at which time Epicyte's portfolio was described as "focused on the discovery and development of human monoclonal antibody products as treatments for a wide range of infectious and inflammatory diseases."
- Large Scale Biology Corporation (LSBC) (bankrupt) – used Tobacco mosaic virus to develop reagents and patient-specific vaccines for Non-Hodgkin's lymphoma, Papillomavirus vaccine, parvovirus vaccine, alpha galactosidase for Fabry disease, lysosomal acid lipase, aprotinin, interferon Alpha 2a and 2b, G-CSF, and Hepatitis B vaccine antigens in tobacco. In 2004, LSBC announced an agreement with Sigma-Aldritch under which LSB would produce recombinant aprotinin in plants of the tobacco family and Sigma-Aldrich would commercially distribute LSBC's recombinant product to its customers in the R&D, cell culture and manufacturing markets. As of October 2012 SIgma still has the protein in stock.
- Meristem Therapeutics – Lipase, lactoferrin, plasma proteins, collagen, antibodies (IgA, IgM), allergens and protease inhibitors in tobacco. Liquidated in 2008.
- Novoplant GmgH – therapeutic proteins in tobacco and feed peas. Conducted field trials in US of feed peas for pigs that produced anti-bacterial antibodies. Former CSO is now with another company; appears that Novoplant is out of business.
- Monsanto Company – abandoned development of pharmaceutical producing corn
- PPL Therapeutics – Alpha 1-antitrypsin for cystic fibrosis and emphysema in sheep milk. This is the company that created Dolly the Sheep, the first cloned animal. Went bankrupt in 2004. Assets were acquired by Pharming and an investment group including University of Pittsburgh Medical Center.
- SemBioSys – insulin in safflower. In May 2012, SemBioSys terminated its operations.

== See also ==
- Biopharmaceutical
- Bioremediation
- Genetically modified organism
- Polly and Molly
- International Center for Technology Assessment
