= Rice allergy =

Type of food allergy

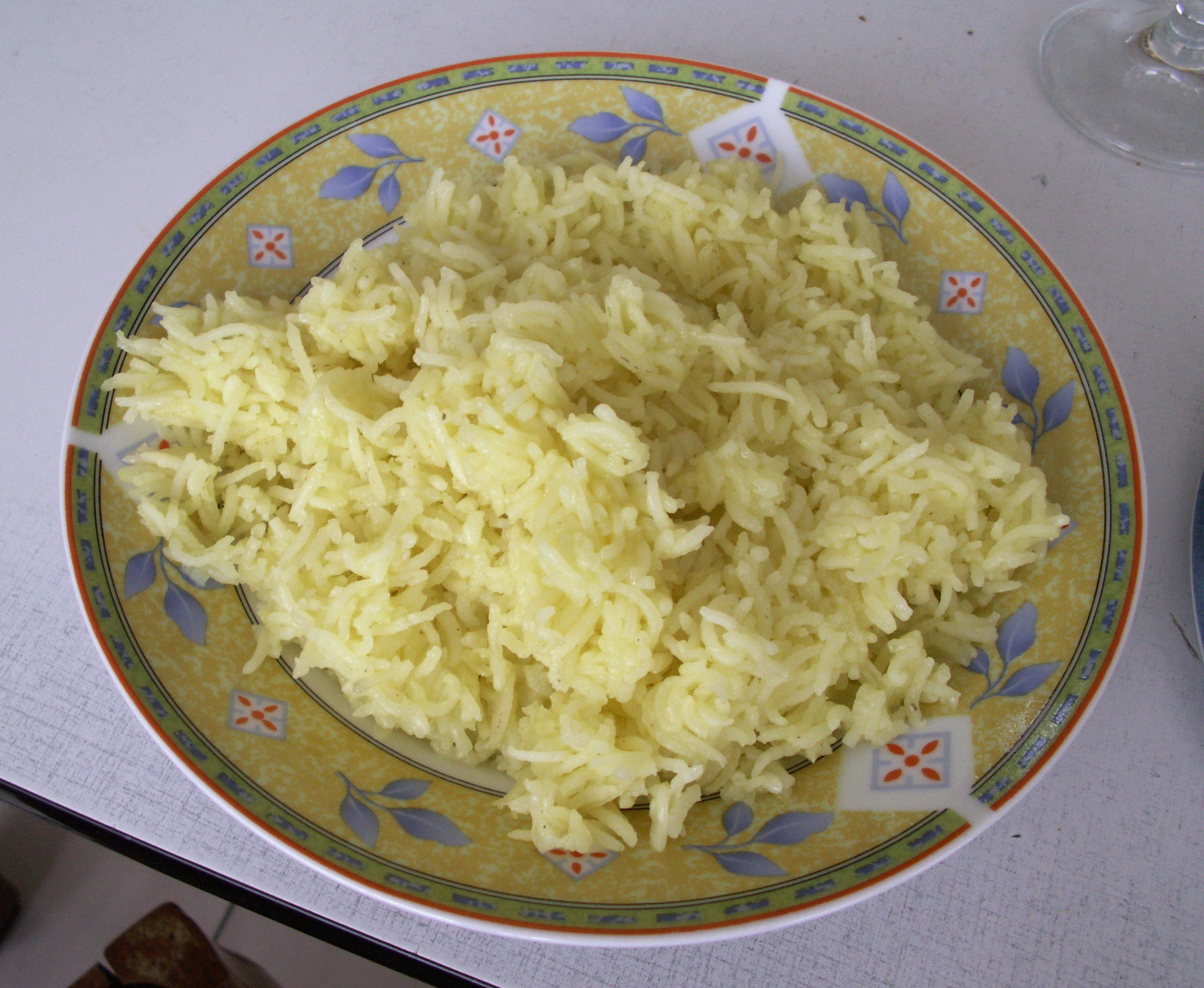
Rice

Rice allergy is a type of food allergy. People allergic to rice react to various rice proteins after consuming rice or inhaling the steam from cooking rice. Although some reactions might lead to severe health problems, doctors can diagnose rice allergy with many methods, and help allergic people to avoid reactions.

== Symptoms and signs ==
Rice proteins are regarded as the causes of allergy in people. People allergic to rice might experience sneezing, runny nose, itching, asthma, stomachache, hives, sores in the mouth, or eczema after eating rice. Besides eating rice, people with a rice allergy can have reactions breathing rice steam from cooked rice. In severe cases death may result.

== Diagnosis ==
People who suspect they might have a rice allergy can try diet avoidance on their own. They avoid rice for two weeks; if they don’t have symptoms during the avoidance period, but have symptoms when exposed to rice, they are most likely allergic to rice.

Specific rice IgE, a kind of antibody in human blood, will rise significantly when people are allergic to rice. A blood test shows the level of the antibody.

Skin prick test, the most efficient diagnosis, shows the reactions in a short period. After being pricked in their skin with some rice mixture, allergic people will experience itching and swelling within 30 minutes.

== Treatment ==
Symptoms might weaken if people receive allergy injection treatments. After receiving several treatments over a year, some formerly allergic people will have no reactions after eating rice.

A new choice for rice allergic people is switching to genetically modified rice which has helped ease some allergic reactions.

Reactions might lessen after staying away from rice long-term.

== Prevalence ==
Unlike other food allergies, rice allergy is relatively uncommon. It has been reported worldwide but mostly in China, Japan or Korea. Because rice is a major food in Asia, people from Asia are exposed to higher allergy risk than people from other areas.
