= Ventria Bioscience =

Biotechnology company

- Company type: Private company
- Industry: Biotechnology
- Founded: 2001
- Headquarters: California
- Area served: United States
- Products: Bioscience Products
- Website: www.ventria.com

Ventria Bioscience was a biotech company with a focus on human nutrition and human therapeutics. The company's core technology was a recombinant DNA-based protein production system (also called a "pharming" system or 'biopharming') called ExpressTec. In 2009, a Division of Ventria called InVitria was created to make animal-free components used in biomanufacturing with locations in Colorado and Kansas

ExpressTec uses self-pollinating crops such as rice and barley to minimize the risk of gene flow normally associated with transgenic plants. Plant-produced proteins also offer advantages for cell culture and bioprocessing use because they replace animal derived components, which have become unpopular due to concerns about prion contamination.

== Facilities ==
Ventria's corporate headquarters was in Denver, Colorado, with additional facilities in Kansas. On September 29, 2006, Kansas officials announced an agreement to bring Ventria’s new bioprocessing facility to Junction City, Kansas. Kansas Governor Kathleen Sebelius was supportive of the agreement and was quoted as stating "I welcome Ventria Bioscience to Kansas and look forward to their contributions to the health of children worldwide." The effort to attract Ventria to Kansas involved a number of players, including Governor Kathleen Sebelius, Secretary of Agriculture Adrian Polansky, The Kansas Department of Commerce, Junction City and Geary County, Kansas Technology Enterprise Corporation (KTEC), KansasBIO, Kansas State University, and Kansas Farm Bureau.

== Divisions and Subsidiaries ==
Ventria created a new division of its company, called InVitria, in 2009. The division specialised in developing and commercialising animal-free cell culture supplements and reagents for use in the bio and life sciences industries. Applications for the products include cellular therapy, vaccines, medical devices, and regenerative medicine among others.

== Markets and products ==
Human health, cell culture and biomanufacturing, and zoonotic disease are the three targeted markets for Ventria's products.

As of 2023 the ExpressTec technology was spun out into a new entity called ExpressTec LLC and the remaining business was renamed InVitria, Inc.

ExpressTec LLC offers contract biomanufacturing services using its ExpressTec platform, and InVitria, sells a line of its proteins that it manufactures for the life sciences research market. Vent

The predecessor company conducted research in the field of zoonotic disease, specifically in lyme disease and rabies, with a goal of developing vaccines and offers some its recombinant proteins to life sciences researchers under a program called BioShare.

== Funding ==
The company has been the recipient of grants and funding from organisations including the Gates Foundation, to develop their ExpressTec system.

== See also ==
- ExpressTec website
