= Plantibody =

Antibody produced by genetically engineering plants with animal DNA

A plantibody is an antibody produced by plants that have been genetically engineered with animal DNA encoding a specific human antibody known to neutralize a particular pathogen or toxin. The transgenic plants produce antibodies similar to their human counterparts, and following purification, plantibodies can be administered therapeutically to acutely ill patients or prophylactically to at-risk individuals (such as healthcare workers). The term plantibody was trademarked by the company Biolex.

Passive immunization is a medical strategy long employed to provide temporary protection against pathogens. Early implementations involved recovering ostensibly cell-free plasma from the blood of human survivors or from non-human animals deliberately exposed to a specific pathogen or toxin. These approaches resulted in crude purifications of plasma-soluble proteins including antibodies. Antibodies (also known as an immunoglobulins) are complex proteins produced by vertebrates that recognize antigens (or molecular patterns) on pathogens and some dangerous compounds in order to alert the adaptive immune system that there are pathogens within the body.

== Production ==
A plantibody is produced by insertion of genes encoding antibodies into a transgenic plant. The plantibodies are then modified by intrinsic plant mechanisms (N-glycosylation). Plantibodies are purified from plant tissues by mechanical disruption and denaturation/removal of intrinsic plant proteins by treatment at high temperature and low pH, as antibodies tend to be stable under these conditions. Antibodies can further be purified away from other acid- and temperature- stable proteins by capture on commercially produced protein A resins. Production of antibodies in whole transgenic plants, such as species in the genus Nicotiana, is cheaper and safer than in cultured animal cells.

== Advantages ==
Transgenic plants offer an attractive method for large-scale production of antibodies for immunotherapy. Antibodies produced in plants have many advantages that are beneficial to humans, plants, and the economy as well. They can be purified cheaply and in large numbers. The many seeds of plants allow for ample storage, and they have no risk of transmitting diseases to humans because the antibodies are produced without the need of the antigen or infectious microorganisms. Plants could be engineered to produce antibodies which fight off their own plant diseases and pests, for example, nematodes, and eliminate the need for toxic pesticides.

== Applications ==
Antibodies generated by plants are cheaper, easier to manage, and safer to use than those obtained from animals. The applications are increasing because recombinant DNA (rDNA) is very useful in creating proteins that are identical when exposed into a plant's. A recombinant DNA is an artificial DNA that is created by combining two or more sequences that would not normally come together. In this way, DNA injected into a plant is turned into recombinant DNA and manipulated. The favorable properties of plants are likely to make the plant systems a useful alternative for small, medium and large scale production throughout the development of new antibody-based pharmaceuticals.

=== Medical ===
The main reason plants are being used to produce antibodies is for treatment of illnesses such as immune disorders, cancer, and inflammatory diseases, given the fact that the plantibodies also have no risk of spreading diseases to humans. In the past 2 decades, research has shown that plant-derived antibodies have become easier to produce.

=== Commercial ===
Plantibodies are close to passing clinical trials and becoming approved commercially because of key points. Plants are more economical than most forms of creating antibodies and the technology for harvesting and maintaining them is already present. Plants also reduce the chance of coming in contact with pathogens, making their antibodies safer to use. Plantibodies can be made at an affordable cost and easier manufacturing due to the availability and relatively easy manipulation of genetic information in crops such as potatoes, soybean, alfalfa, rice, wheat and tobacco.

== Outlook ==
Commercial use is not yet legalized, but clinical trials are underway to implement the use of plantibodies for humans as injections. So far, companies have started conducting human tests of pharmaceutical products, creating plantibodies that include:

- Hepatitis B vaccine
- Antibody to fight cavity causing bacteria
- Antibodies to prevent sexually transmitted diseases
- Antibodies for non-Hodgkin's -cell lymphoma
- Vaccine against HIV virus
- Anthrax vaccine (from tobacco)
- Antibodies against Ebola virus

By being able to genetically alter plants to create specific antibodies, it is easier to produce antibodies that will fight diseases not only for plants but for human as well. For that reason, plantibody applications will move more towards the medicinal field.
