= Host cell protein =

Impurities that occur in the production of biopharmaceutical proteins

Host cell proteins (HCPs) are process-related protein impurities that are produced by the host organism during biotherapeutic manufacturing and production. During the purification process, a majority of produced HCPs are removed from the final product (>99% of impurities removed). However, residual HCPs still remain in the final distributed pharmaceutical drug. Examples of HCPs that may remain in the desired pharmaceutical product include: monoclonal antibodies (mAbs), antibody-drug-conjugates (ADCs), therapeutic proteins, vaccines, and other protein-based biopharmaceuticals.

HCPs may cause immunogenicity in individuals or reduce the potency, stability or overall effectiveness of a drug. National regulatory organisations, such as the FDA and EMA provide guidelines on acceptable levels of HCPs that may remain in pharmaceutical products before they are made available to the public. The accepted level of HCPs in a final product is evaluated on a case-by-case basis, and depends on multiple factors including: dose, frequency of drug administration, type of drug and severity of disease.

The acceptable range of HCPs in a final pharmaceutical product is large due to limitations with the detection and analytical methods that currently exist. Analysis of HCPs is complex as the HCP mixture consists of a large variety of protein species, all of which are unique to the specific host organisms, and unrelated to the intended and desired recombinant protein. Analysing these large varieties of protein species at very minute concentrations is difficult and requires extremely sensitive equipment which has not been fully developed yet. The reason that HCP levels need to be monitored is due to the uncertain effects they have on the body. At trace amounts, the effects of HCPs on patients are unknown and specific HCPs may affect protein stability and drug effectiveness, or cause immunogenicity in patients. If the stability of the drug is affected, durability of the active substance in the pharmaceutical product could decrease. The effects that the drug is intended to have on patients could also possibly be increased or decreased, leading to health complications that may arise. The degree of immunogenicity on a long-term basis is difficult, and almost impossible, to determine and consequences can include severe threats to the patient’s health.

== Safety risk ==
HCPs in biopharmaceutical products pose a potential safety risk to humans by introducing foreign proteins and biomolecules to the human immune system. Since common host cells used to produce biopharmaceutical drugs are E. coli, yeast, mouse myeloma cell line (NS0) and Chinese hamster ovary (CHO), the resultant HCPs are genetically different to what the human body recognizes. As a consequence of this, the presence of HCPs in humans can activate an immune response, which can lead to possibly severe health concerns.

There is a correlation between the amount of foreign antigens (HPCs) in our body and the level of immune response our body produces. The more HCPs present in a drug, the higher the immune response that will be activated. Several studies have linked a reduction in HCPs to a decline in specific inflammatory cytokines. Other HCPs may be very similar to a human protein and may induce an immune response with cross reactivity against the human protein or the drug substance protein. The exact consequences of HCPs for an individual patient is uncertain and difficult to determine with the current analytical methods used in biopharmaceutical production and analysis.

== Analysis ==
HCPs are identified during the manufacturing of biopharmaceuticals as part of the quality control process.

During the production process several factors, including the genes of the host cell, the way of product expression and the purification steps, influence the final HCP composition and abundance. Several studies report that HCPs are often co-purified along with the product itself by interacting with the recombinant protein.

Enzyme linked immunosorbent assay (ELISA) is the predominant method for HCP analysis in pharmaceutical products due to its high sensitivity to proteins, which allows it to detect the low levels of HCPs in produced drugs. Even though the developmental process requires an extended period of work and several tests with animal models, analysis of HCP content in the final product can be rapidly performed and interpreted. Whilst ELISA possesses the sensitivity to undergo HCP analysis, several limitations are associated with the procedure. The HCP quantification relies mainly on the quantity and affinity of anti-HCP antibodies for detection of the HCP antigens. Anti-HCP antibody pools cannot cover the entire HCP population and weakly immunogenic proteins are impossible to detect, since equivalent antibodies are not generated in the process.

In addition, methods such as the combination of mass spectrometry (MS) and liquid chromatography (LC-MS) have been developed to allow for more efficient and effective HCP analysis and purification. These methods are able to:

- Detect varying protein concentrations in a complex sample
- Track an ever-changing HCP population and their concentrations during a manufacturing process
- Analyse many proteins at once
- Measure low abundant HCPs overshadowed by the high abundant target protein product
- Characterize HCP-ELISA reagents, including both the antibodies and the associated kit standard

Recently, the MS method has been further improved through the method SWATH LC-MS. SWATH is a data independent acquisition (DIA) form of mass spectrometry, where the mass range is partitioned in small mass windows, which is then analysed with tandem MS (MS/MS). The key advantages are the reproducibility for both individual HCP identification and absolute quantification by applying internal protein standards.

Despite the solid improvements of this method of protein analysis, there are also limitations, the main of which is that it requires a high level of expertise and advanced instrumentation to conduct the analysis.

== See also ==
- Biomolecular engineering
- Biopharmaceutical
- Liquid chromatography–mass spectrometry
- Nanomedicine
- Mass spectrometry
- Protein production
- Protein purification
- Recombinant DNA
