= Protein purification =

Biochemical method

The process of extracting proteins from cells and then separating them using various techniques to obtain a single protein of interest (from the thousands of different types inside of cells). Once purified, the structure and/or function of a protein can be studied.

Protein purification is a series of processes intended to isolate one or a few proteins from a complex mixture, usually cells, tissues, or whole organisms. Protein purification is vital for the specification of the function, structure, and interactions of the protein of interest. The purification process may separate the protein and non-protein parts of the mixture, and finally separate the desired protein from all other proteins. Ideally, to study a protein of interest, it must be separated from other components of the cell so that contaminants will not interfere in the examination of the protein of interest's structure and function. Separation of one protein from all others is typically the most laborious aspect of protein purification. Separation steps usually exploit differences in protein size, physico-chemical properties, binding affinity, and biological activity. The pure result may be termed protein isolate.

== Purpose ==
The protein manufacturing cost remains high and there is a growing demand to develop cost efficient and rapid protein purification methods. Understanding the different protein purification methods and optimizing the downstream processing is critical to minimize production costs while maintaining the quality of acceptable standards of homogeneity. Protein purification is either preparative or analytical.

Preparative purifications aim to produce a relatively large quantity of purified proteins for subsequent use. Examples include the preparation of commercial products such as enzymes (e.g. lactase), nutritional proteins (e.g. soy protein isolate), and certain biopharmaceuticals (e.g. insulin). Several preparative purification steps are often deployed to remove bi-products, such as host cell proteins, which pose a potential threat to the patient's health.

Analytical purification produces a relatively small amount of a protein for a variety of research or analytical purposes, including identification, quantification, and studies of the protein's structure, post-translational modifications, and function. Each step of a protein purification scheme is monitored and takes into consideration purification levels and yield. A high purification level and a poor yield leaves hardly any protein with which to experiment. On the other hand, a high yield with low purification levels leaves many contaminants (proteins other than the one interest) which interfere with research purposes.

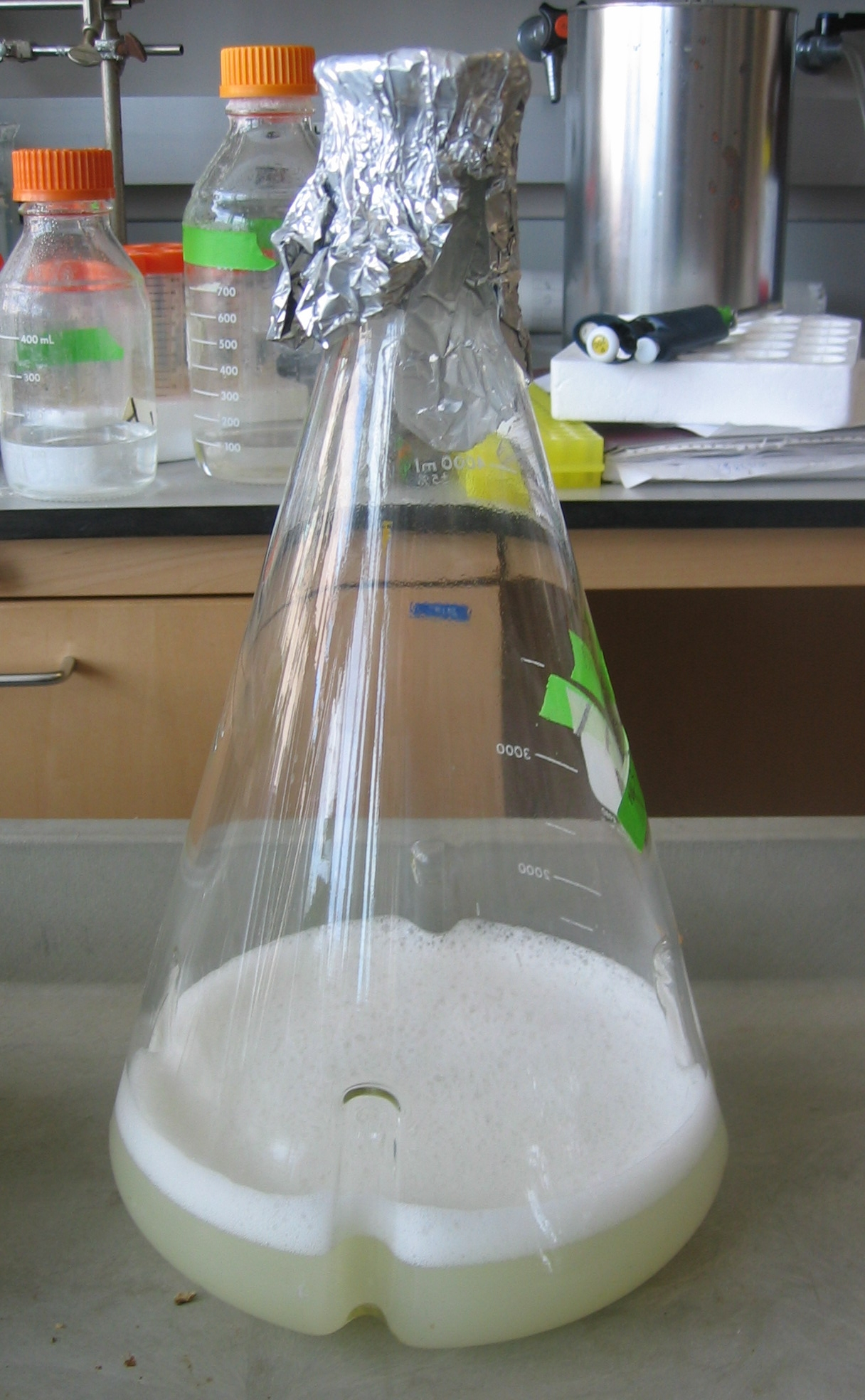
Recombinant bacteria can be grown in a flask containing growth media.

== Preliminary steps ==
=== Extraction ===
If the protein of interest is not secreted by the organism into the surrounding solution, the first step of each purification process is the disruption of the cells containing the protein. Depending on how fragile the protein is and how stable the cells are, one could, for instance, use one of the following methods: i) repeated freezing and thawing, ii) sonication, iii) homogenization by high pressure (French press), iv) homogenization by grinding (bead mill), and v) permeabilization by detergents (e.g. Triton X-100) and/or enzymes (e.g. lysozyme). Finally, the cell debris can be removed by differential centrifugation, which is a procedure where the homogenate is centrifuged at low speed, then again at a greater force to yield a pellet consisting of nuclei and supernatant. This yields several fractions of decreasing density where more discriminating purification techniques are applied to one fraction.

Also, proteases are released during cell lysis, which will start digesting the proteins in the solution. If the protein of interest is sensitive to proteolysis, it is recommended to proceed quickly, and to keep the extract cooled, to slow down the digestion. Alternatively, one or more protease inhibitors can be added to the lysis buffer immediately before cell disruption. Sometimes it is also necessary to add DNAse in order to reduce the viscosity of the cell lysate caused by a high DNA content.

=== Ultracentrifugation ===
Centrifugation is a process that uses centrifugal force to separate mixtures of particles of varying masses or densities suspended in a liquid. When a vessel (typically a tube or bottle) containing a mixture of proteins or other particulate matter, such as bacterial cells, is rotated at high speeds, the inertia of each particle yields a force in the direction of the particles velocity that is proportional to its mass. The tendency of a given particle to move through the liquid because of this force is offset by the resistance the liquid exerts on the particle. The net effect of "spinning" the sample in a centrifuge is that massive, small, and dense particles move outward faster than less massive particles or particles with more "drag" in the liquid. When suspensions of particles are "spun" in a centrifuge, a "pellet" may form at the bottom of the vessel that is enriched for the most massive particles with low drag in the liquid.

Non-compacted particles remain mostly in the liquid called "supernatant" and can be removed from the vessel thereby separating the supernatant from the pellet. The rate of centrifugation is determined by the angular acceleration applied to the sample, typically measured in comparison to the g-force. If samples are centrifuged long enough, the particles in the vessel will reach equilibrium wherein the particles accumulate specifically at a point in the vessel where their buoyant density is balanced with centrifugal force. Such an "equilibrium" centrifugation can allow extensive purification of a given particle.

Sucrose gradient centrifugation—a linear concentration gradient of sugar (typically sucrose, glycerol, or a silica-based density gradient media, like Percoll)—is generated in a tube such that the highest concentration is on the bottom and lowest on top. A protein sample is then layered on top of the gradient and spun at high speeds in an ultracentrifuge. This causes heavy macromolecules to migrate towards the bottom of the tube faster than lighter material. During centrifugation in the absence of sucrose, as particles move farther and farther from the center of rotation, they experience more and more centrifugal force (the further they move, the faster they move). The problem with this is that the useful separation range within the vessel is restricted to a small observable window. Spinning a sample twice as long does not mean the particle of interest will go twice as far; in fact, it will go significantly further. However, when the proteins are moving through a sucrose gradient, they encounter liquid of increasing density and viscosity. A properly designed sucrose gradient will counteract the increasing centrifugal force so the particles move in close proportion to the time they have been in the centrifugal field. Samples separated by these gradients are referred to as "rate zonal" centrifugations. After separating the protein/particles, the gradient is then fractionated and collected. In biochemistry, ultracentrifugation is valuable for separating biomolecules and analyzing their physical properties.

== Purification strategies ==
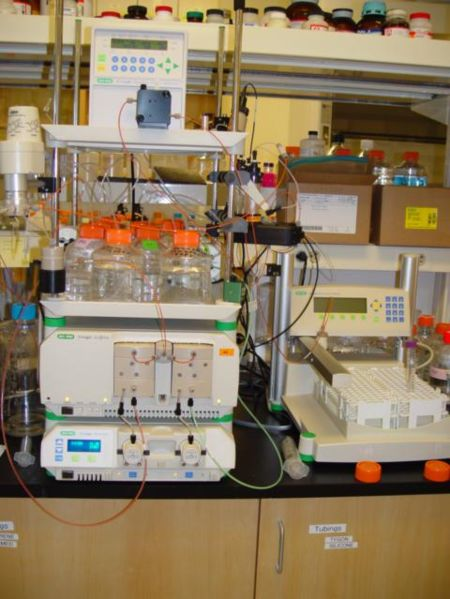
Chromatographic equipment set up for a size exclusion chromatography. The buffer is pumped through the column (right) by a computer controlled device.

The choice of starting material is key to the design of a purification process. In a plant or animal, a particular protein usually is not distributed homogeneously throughout the body; different organs or tissues have higher or lower concentrations of the protein. The use of only the tissues or organs with the highest concentration decreases the volumes needed to produce a given amount of purified protein. If the protein is present in low abundance, or if it has a high value, scientists may use recombinant DNA technology to develop cells that will produce large quantities of the desired protein (this is known as an expression system). Recombinant expression allows the protein to be tagged, e.g. by a His-tag or Strep-tag to facilitate purification, reducing the number of purification steps required.

Analytical purification generally utilizes three properties to separate proteins. First, proteins may be purified according to their isoelectric points by running them through a pH-graded gel or an ion exchange column. Second, proteins can be separated according to their size or molecular weight via size exclusion chromatography or by SDS-PAGE (sodium dodecyl sulfate-polyacrylamide gel electrophoresis) analysis. Proteins are often purified by using 2D-PAGE and are then analysed by peptide mass fingerprinting to establish the protein identity. This is very useful for scientific purposes and the detection limits for protein are nowadays very low and nanogram amounts of protein are sufficient for their analysis. Thirdly, proteins may be separated by polarity/hydrophobicity via high-performance liquid chromatography or reversed-phase chromatography.

Usually, a protein purification protocol contains one or more chromatographic steps. The basic procedure in chromatography is to flow the solution containing the protein through a column packed with various materials. Different proteins interact differently with the column material, and can thus be separated by the time required to pass the column, or the conditions required to elute the protein from the column. Proteins are typically detected as they are coming off the column by their absorbance at 280 nm. Many different chromatographic methods exist:

=== Precipitation and differential solubilization ===
Most proteins require some salt to dissolve in water, a process called salting in. As the salt concentration is increased, proteins can precipitate, a process called salting out which involves changing protein solubility. For example, in bulk protein purification, a common first step to isolate proteins is precipitation with ammonium sulfate (NH_{4})_{2}SO_{4}. This is performed by adding increasing amounts of ammonium sulfate and collecting the different fractions of precipitated protein. Subsequently, ammonium sulfate can be removed using dialysis (separating proteins from small molecules through a semipermeable membrane). During the ammonium sulfate precipitation step, hydrophobic groups present on the proteins are exposed to the atmosphere, attracting other hydrophobic groups; the result is the formation of an aggregate of hydrophobic components. In this case, the protein precipitate will typically be visible to the naked eye. One advantage of this method is that it can be performed inexpensively, even with very large volumes.

The first proteins to be purified are water-soluble proteins. Purification of integral membrane proteins requires disruption of the cell membrane in order to isolate any one particular protein from others that are in the same membrane compartment. Sometimes a particular membrane fraction can be isolated first, such as isolating mitochondria from cells before purifying a protein located in a mitochondrial membrane. A detergent such as sodium dodecyl sulfate (SDS) can be used to dissolve cell membranes and keep membrane proteins in solution during purification; however, because SDS causes denaturation, milder detergents such as Triton X-100 or CHAPS can be used to retain the protein's native conformation during complete purification.

=== Size exclusion (gel-filtration chromatography) ===
Chromatography can be used to separate protein in solution or denaturing conditions by using porous gels. This technique is a more discriminating separation and is known as size exclusion chromatography. The principle is that smaller molecules have to traverse a larger volume in a porous matrix. Consequentially, proteins of a certain range in size will require a variable volume of eluent (solvent) before being collected at the other end of the column of gel. Larger molecules (or proteins) will travel through less volume and elute prior to smaller molecules.

In the context of protein purification, the eluent is usually pooled in different test tubes. All test tubes containing no measurable trace of the protein to purify are discarded. The remaining solution is thus made of the protein to purify and any other similarly-sized proteins.

=== Separation based on charge (ion-exchange chromatography) ===
One chromatography technique based on molecular properties is usually not sufficient in obtaining a protein of high purity. In addition to size, ion exchange chromatography separates compounds according to the nature and degree of their ionic charge. The column to be used is selected according to its type and strength of charge. Anion exchange resins have a positive charge and are used to retain and separate negatively charged compounds (anions), while cation exchange resins have a negative charge and are used to separate positively charged molecules (cations).

Before the separation begins a buffer is pumped through the column to equilibrate the opposing charged ions. Upon injection of the sample, solute molecules will exchange with the buffer ions as each competes for the binding sites on the resin. The length of retention for each solute depends upon the strength of its charge. The most weakly charged compounds will elute first, followed by those with successively stronger charges. Because of the nature of the separating mechanism, pH, buffer type, buffer concentration, and temperature all play important roles in controlling the separation.

Ion exchange chromatography is a very powerful tool for use in protein purification and is frequently used in both analytical and preparative separations. It is especially useful when purifying nucleic-acid binding proteins, where separation of the protein from the bound nucleic acid is required to obtain a pure sample devoid of nucleic acids co-purified from the expression system or the native source.

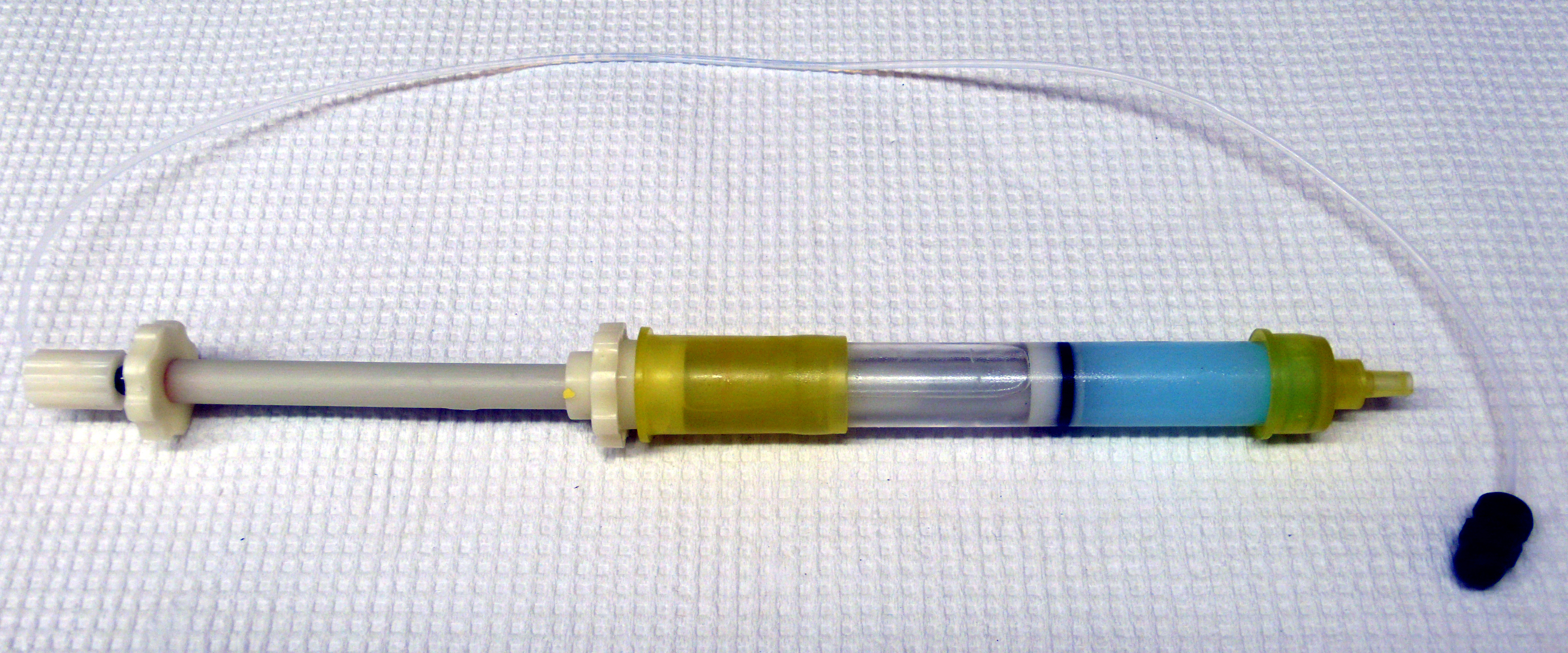
Nickel-affinity column. The resin is blue since it has bound nickel.

=== Free-flow-electrophoresis ===
Free-flow electrophoresis (FFE) is a carrier-free electrophoresis technique that allows preparative protein separation in a laminar buffer stream by using an orthogonal electric field. By making use of a pH-gradient, that can for example be induced by ampholytes, this technique allows to separate protein isoforms up to a resolution of < 0.02 delta-pI.

=== Separation based on hydrophobicity (hydrophobic interaction chromatography) ===
HIC media is amphiphilic, with both hydrophobic and hydrophilic regions, allowing for the separation of proteins based on their surface hydrophobicity. Target proteins and their product aggregate species tend to have different hydrophobic properties and removing them via HIC further purifies the protein of interest. Additionally, the environment used typically employs less harsh denaturing conditions than other chromatography techniques, thus helping to preserve the protein of interest in its native and functional state. In pure water, the interactions between the resin and the hydrophobic regions of protein would be very weak, but this interaction is enhanced by applying a protein sample to HIC resin in a high ionic strength buffer. The ionic strength of the buffer is then reduced to elute proteins in order of decreasing hydrophobicity.

=== Affinity chromatography ===
Affinity Chromatography is another powerful separation technique that is highly selective for the protein of interest based upon molecular conformation, which frequently utilizes application specific resins. These resins have ligands attached to their surfaces which are specific for the compounds to be separated. Most frequently, these ligands function in a fashion similar to that of antibody-antigen interactions. This "lock and key" fit between the ligand and its target compound makes it highly specific, frequently generating a single peak, while all else in the sample is unretained.

Many membrane proteins are glycoproteins and can be purified by lectin affinity chromatography. Detergent-solubilized proteins can be allowed to bind to a chromatography resin that has been modified to have a covalently attached lectin. Proteins that do not bind to the lectin are washed away and then specifically bound glycoproteins can be eluted by adding a high concentration of a sugar that competes with the bound glycoproteins at the lectin binding site. Some lectins have high affinity binding to oligosaccharides of glycoproteins that is hard to compete with sugars, and bound glycoproteins need to be released by denaturing the lectin.

=== Immunoaffinity chromatography ===
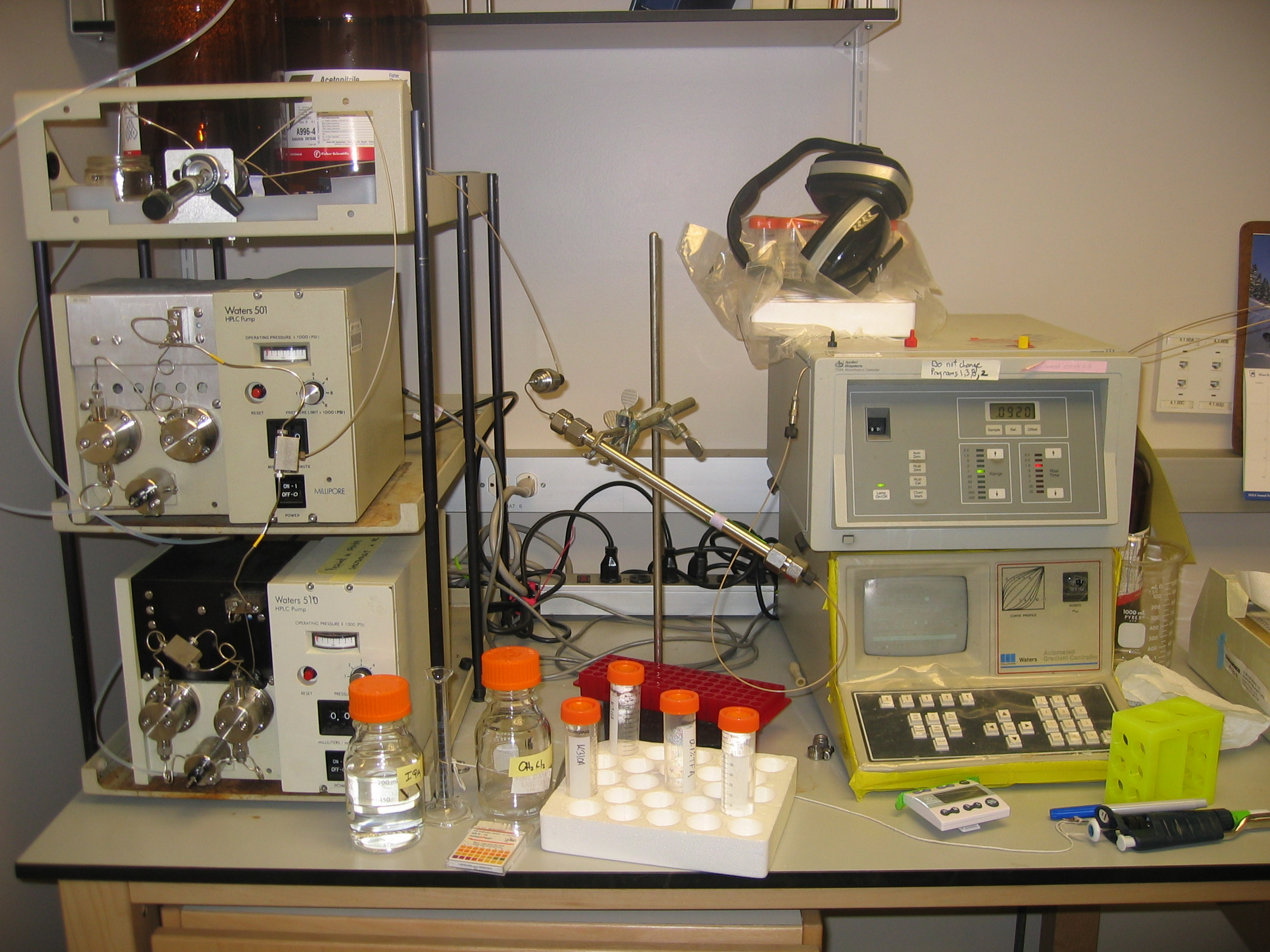
An HPLC. From left to right: A pumping device generating a gradient of two different solvents, a steel enforced column and an apparatus for measuring the absorbance.

Immunoaffinity chromatography uses the specific binding of an antibody-antigen to selectively purify the target protein. The procedure involves immobilizing a protein to a solid substrate (e.g. a porous bead or a membrane), which then selectively binds the target, while everything else flows through. The target protein can be eluted by changing the pH or the salinity. The immobilized ligand can be an antibody (such as immunoglobulin G) or it can be a protein (such as protein A). Because this method does not involve engineering in a tag, it can be used for proteins from natural sources.

=== HPLC ===
High-performance liquid chromatography or high-pressure liquid chromatography is a form of chromatography applying high pressure to drive the solutes through the column faster. This means that the diffusion is limited and the resolution is improved. The most common form is "reversed phase" HPLC, where the column material is hydrophobic. The proteins are eluted by a gradient of increasing amounts of an organic solvent, such as acetonitrile. The proteins elute according to their hydrophobicity. After purification by HPLC the protein is in a solution that only contains volatile compounds, and can easily be lyophilized. HPLC purification frequently results in denaturation of the purified proteins and is thus not applicable to proteins that do not spontaneously refold.

=== Purification of a tagged protein ===
Another way to tag proteins is to engineer an antigen peptide tag onto the protein, and then purify the protein on a column or by incubating with a loose resin that is coated with an immobilized antibody. This particular procedure is known as immunoprecipitation. Immunoprecipitation is capable of generating an extremely specific interaction which usually results in binding only the desired protein. The purified tagged proteins can then easily be separated from the other proteins in solution and later eluted back into clean solution.

When the tags are not needed anymore, they can be cleaved off by a protease. This often involves engineering a protease cleavage site between the tag and the protein.

Self-cleaving tags eliminate the need for proteases to separate tag from target protein of interest during purification process (e.g. iCapTag™). The main component of the tag is an intein, which cleaves off simply after a pH change. Tagless and pure target protein is then released into the elution buffer.

Emerging methods in synthetic biology explore chromatography-free alternatives by harnessing liquid-liquid phase separation to create synthetic organelles within bacterial cells, such as E. coli. These approaches use phase-separated RNA structures to compartmentalize proteins, enabling in-cell organization, self-cleavage via inteins, and direct release of tag-free proteins, which leads to enhanced efficiency in recombinant protein workflows.

== Concentration of the purified protein ==
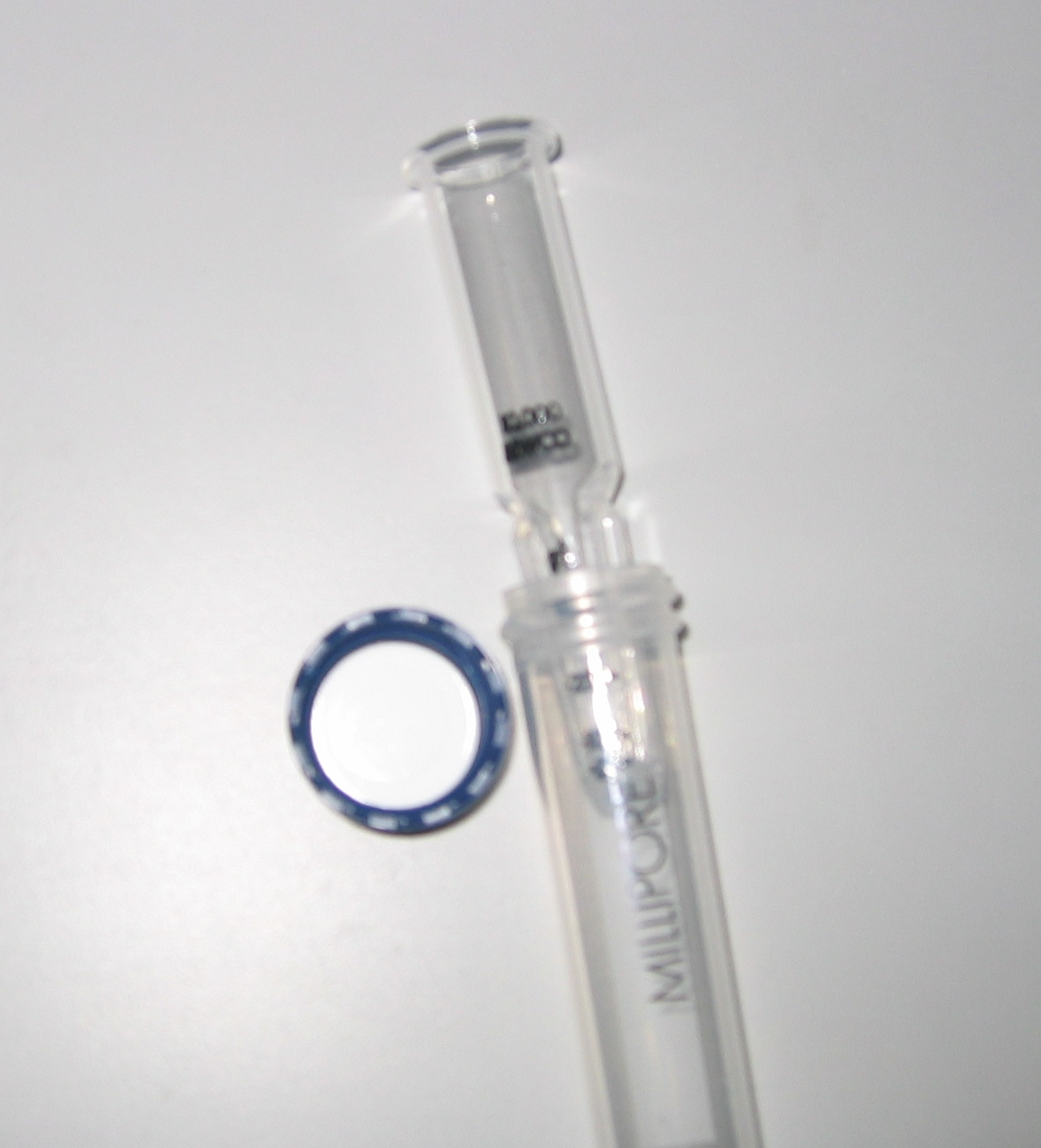
A selectively permeable membrane can be mounted in a centrifuge tube. The buffer is forced through the membrane by centrifugation, leaving the protein in the upper chamber.

At the end of a protein purification, the protein often has to be concentrated. Different methods exist.

=== Lyophilization ===
If the solution doesn't contain any other soluble component than the protein in question the protein can be lyophilized (dried). This is commonly done after an HPLC run. This simply removes all volatile components, leaving the proteins behind.

=== Ultrafiltration ===
Ultrafiltration concentrates a protein solution using selective permeable membranes. The function of the membrane is to let the water and small molecules pass through while retaining the protein. The solution is forced against the membrane by mechanical pump, gas pressure, or centrifugation.

== Evaluating purification yield ==
The most general method to monitor the purification process is by running a SDS-PAGE of the different steps. This method only gives a rough measure of the amounts of different proteins in the mixture, and it is not able to distinguish between proteins with similar apparent molecular weight.

If the protein has a distinguishing spectroscopic feature or an enzymatic activity, this property can be used to detect and quantify the specific protein, and thus to select the fractions of the separation, that contains the protein. If antibodies against the protein are available then western blotting and ELISA can specifically detect and quantify the amount of desired protein. Some proteins function as receptors and can be detected during purification steps by a ligand binding assay, often using a radioactive ligand.

In order to evaluate the process of multistep purification, the amount of the specific protein has to be compared to the amount of total protein. The latter can be determined by the Bradford total protein assay or by absorbance of light at 280 nm, however some reagents used during the purification process may interfere with the quantification. For example, imidazole (commonly used for purification of polyhistidine-tagged recombinant proteins) is an amino acid analogue and at low concentrations will interfere with the bicinchoninic acid (BCA) assay for total protein quantification. Impurities in low-grade imidazole will also absorb at 280 nm, resulting in an inaccurate reading of protein concentration from UV absorbance.

Another method to be considered is surface plasmon resonance (SPR). SPR can detect binding of label free molecules on the surface of a chip. If the desired protein is an antibody, binding can be translated directly to the activity of the protein. One can express the active concentration of the protein as the percent of the total protein. SPR can be a powerful method for quickly determining protein activity and overall yield. It is a powerful technology that requires an instrument to perform.

== Analytical ==
=== Denaturing-condition electrophoresis ===
Gel electrophoresis is a common laboratory technique that can be used both as a preparative and analytical method. The principle of electrophoresis relies on the movement of a charged ion in an electric field. In practice, the proteins are denatured in a solution containing a detergent (SDS). In these conditions, the proteins are unfolded and coated with negatively charged detergent molecules. The proteins in SDS-PAGE are separated on the sole basis of their size.

In analytical methods, the protein migrate as bands based on size. Each band can be detected using stains such as Coomassie blue dye or silver stain. Preparative methods to purify large amounts of protein, require the extraction of the protein from the electrophoretic gel. This extraction may involve excision of the gel containing a band, or eluting the band directly off the gel as it runs off the end of the gel.

In the context of a purification strategy, denaturing condition electrophoresis provides an improved resolution over size exclusion chromatography, but does not scale to large quantity of proteins in a sample as well as the late chromatography columns.

=== Non-denaturing-condition electrophoresis ===
A non-denaturing electrophoretic procedure for isolating bioactive metalloproteins in complex protein mixtures is preparative native PAGE. The intactness or the structural integrity of the isolated protein must be confirmed by an independent method.

== See also ==
- Salting out
- Protein tag
- Protein production
- Host cell protein
