= Synthon (company) =

Dutch pharmaceutical company

- Industry: Pharmaceutical
- Founded: September 17, 1991; 34 years ago in Nijmegen, Gelderland, The Netherlands
- Founder: Dr. Jacques Lemmens
- Headquarters: Nijmegen, The Netherlands
- Key people: CEO Anish Mehta
- Products: Pharmaceutical
- Number of employees: 1,600 (2022)
- Website: www.synthon.com

Synthon is a Dutch multinational that produces generic human drugs.

The company was founded in 1991 by Jacques Lemmens and Marijn Oosterbaan, two organic chemists of the Radboud University Nijmegen. Synthon is active in the Netherlands, the Czech Republic, Spain, the United States, Argentina, Chile, Russia, Mexico and South Korea with about 1,500 employees. The company is headquartered in Nijmegen.

Medications made by Synthon include:

- Simvastatin (A statin)
- Tamsulosin (An alpha blocker for the symptomatic treatment of benign prostatic hyperplasia)
- Paroxetine (An antidepressant)
- Fluvoxamine (An antidepressant)

The products are marketed by partners of the company. The name Synthon is not mentioned on the packaging.

== History ==
In 2007 the company started developing biopharmaceuticals.

In May 2012 Synthon announced that it bought the Biolex LEX System for manufacturing biopharmaceuticals in Lemna. The sale also included two preclinical biologics made with the LEX System, BLX-301, a humanized and glyco-optimized anti-CD20 antibody for non-Hodgkin's B-cell lymphoma and other B-cell malignancies and BLX-155, a direct-acting thrombolytic. The financial terms of the sale were not disclosed.

== See also ==
- PolyAnalytik
