= Genetically modified rice =

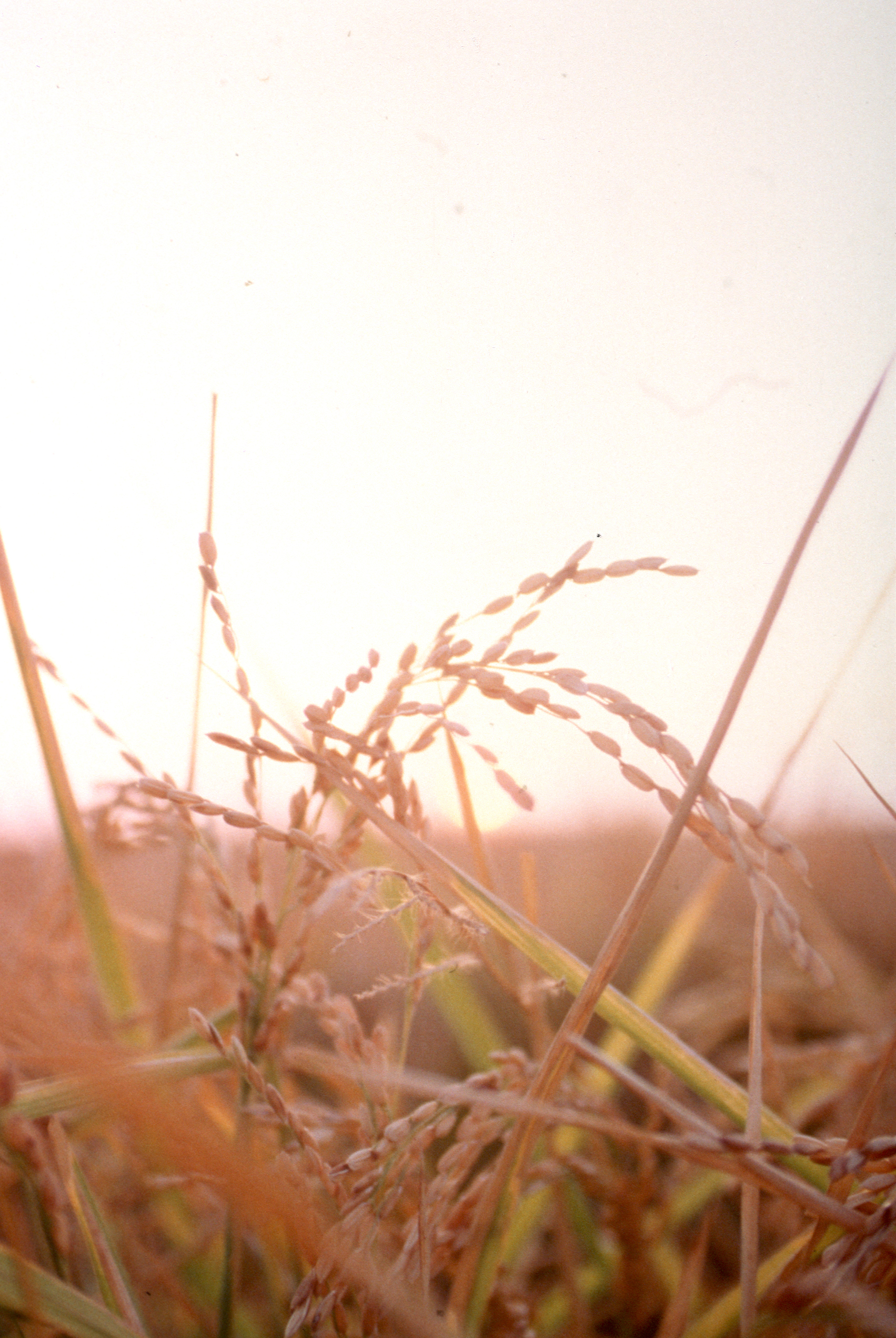
Rice plants being used for genetic modification

Genetically modified rice are rice strains that have been genetically modified (also called genetic engineering). Rice plants have been modified to increase micronutrients such as vitamin A, accelerate photosynthesis, tolerate herbicides, resist pests, increase grain size, generate nutrients, flavors or produce human proteins.

The natural movement of genes across species, often called horizontal gene transfer or lateral gene transfer, can also occur with rice through gene transfer mediated by natural vectors. Transgenic events between rice and Setaria millet have been identified. The cultivation and use of genetically modified varieties of rice remains controversial and is not approved in some countries.

== History ==
In 2000, the first two GM rice varieties both with herbicide-resistance, called LLRice60 and LLRice62, were approved in the United States. Later, these and other types of herbicide-resistant GM rice were approved in Canada, Australia, Mexico and Colombia. However, none of these approvals triggered commercialization. Reuters reported in 2009 that China had granted biosafety approval to GM rice with pest resistance, but that strain was not commercialized. As of December 2012 GM rice was not widely available for production or consumption. Research suggests that since rice is a staple crop across the world, improvements have potential to alleviate hunger, malnutrition and poverty.

In 2018, Canada and the United States approved genetically modified golden rice for cultivation, with Health Canada and the US Food and Drug Administration declaring it safe for consumption.

As of 2021, salt-tolerant "seawater" rice in China had been planted on 400,000 ha (990,000 acres) in soils with up to 4 grams of salt per kilogram, with yields averaging 8.8 tons per hectare, according to Qingdao Saline-Alkali Tolerant Rice Research and Development Center.

== Traits ==
=== Herbicide resistance ===
In 2000–2001 Monsanto researched adding glyphosate tolerance to rice but did not attempt to bring a variety to market. Bayer's line of herbicide resistant rice is known as LibertyLink. LibertyLink rice is resistant to glufosinate (the active chemical in Liberty herbicide). Bayer CropScience is attempting to get their latest variety (LL62) approved for use in the EU. The strain is approved for use in the US but is not in large-scale use. Clearfield rice was bred by selection from variations created in environments known to cause accelerated rates of mutations. This variety tolerates imidazole herbicides. It was bred by traditional breeding techniques that are not considered to be genetic engineering. Clearfield is also crossbred with higher yielding varieties to produce an overall hardier plant.

=== Nutritional value ===
Golden rice with higher concentrations of Vitamin A was originally created by Ingo Potrykus and his team. This genetically modified rice is capable of producing beta-carotene in the endosperm (grain) which is a precursor for vitamin A. Syngenta was involved in the early development of Golden Rice and held some intellectual property that it donated to non-profit groups including the International Rice Research Institute (IRRI) to develop on a non-profit basis. The scientific details of the rice were first published in Science Magazine in 2000.

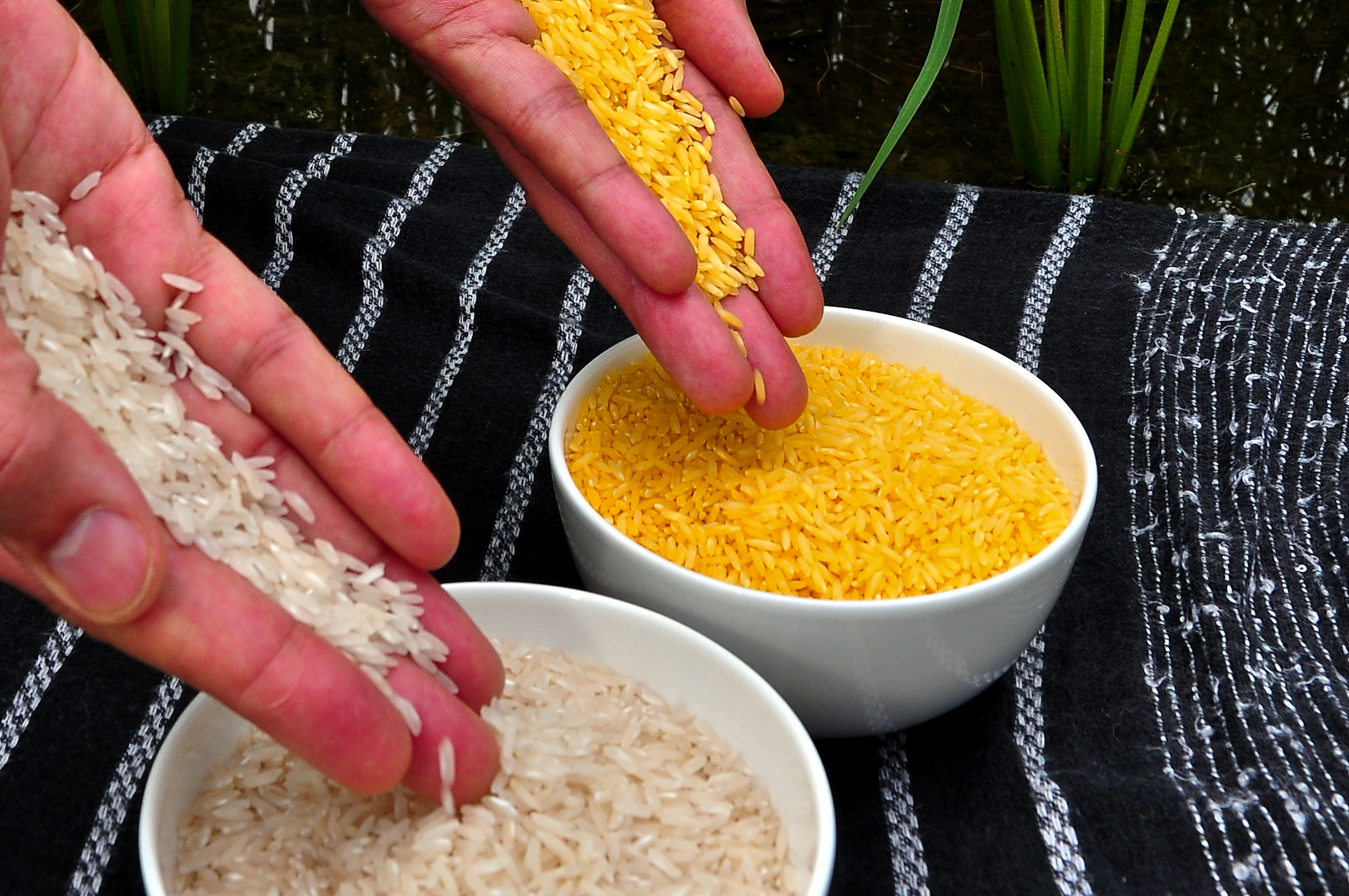
Golden Rice grains (right) compared to regular rice grains (left)

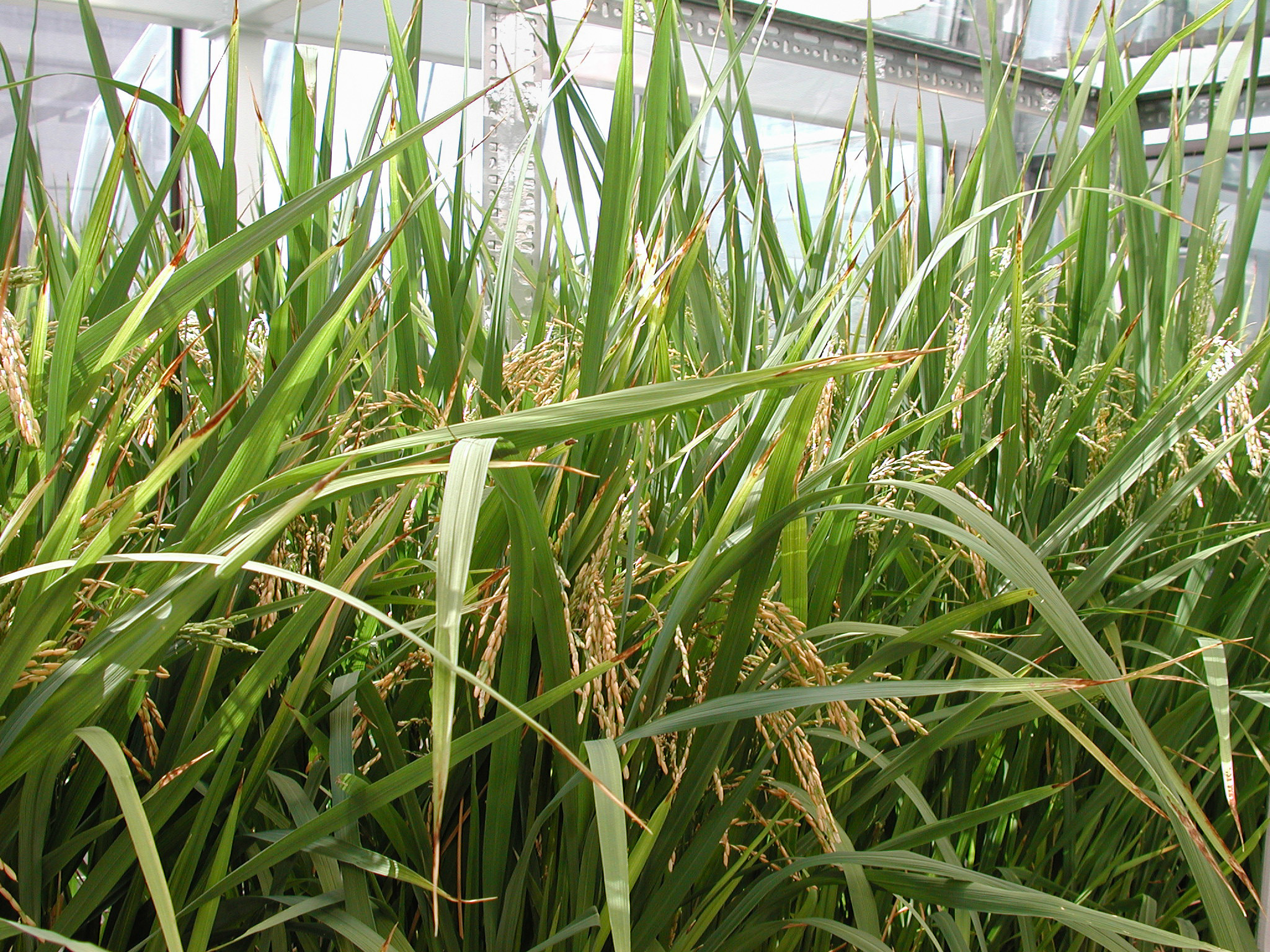
Golden Rice plants being grown in greenhouse

The World Health Organization stated that iron deficiency affects 30% of the world's population. Research scientists from the Australian Centre for Plant Functional Genomics (ACPFG) and IRRI to are working to increase the amount of iron in rice. They have modified three populations of rice by over expressing the genes OsNAS1, OsNAS2 or OsNAS3. The research team found that nicotianamine, iron, and zinc concentration levels increased in all three populations relative to controls.

=== Pest resistance ===
==== Bt rice ====
BT rice is modified to express the cryIA(b) gene of the Bacillus thuringiensis bacterium. The gene confers resistance to a variety of pests including the rice borer through the production of endotoxins. The Chinese Government is doing field trials on insect resistant cultivars. The benefit of BT rice is that farmers do not need to spray their crops with pesticides to control fungal, viral, or bacterial pathogens. Conventional rice is sprayed three to four times per growing season to control pests. Other benefits include increased yield and revenue from crop cultivation. China approved the rice for large-scale use as of 2009. Resistance management is needed in southeast Asia to prevent loss of efficacy of Bt in rice.

=== Allergy resistance ===
Researchers in Japan are attempting to develop hypoallergenic rice cultivars. Researchers are trying to repress the formation of allergen AS-Albumin.

Japanese researchers tested genetically modified rice on macaque monkeys that would prevent allergies to cedar pollen, which causes hay fever. Cedar allergy symptoms include itchy eyes, sneezing and other serious allergic reactions. The modified rice contains seven proteins from cedar pollen (7Crp) to block these symptoms by inducing oral tolerance. Takaiwa is conducting human clinical trials with this 7Crp protein as an oral vaccine.

=== C4 photosynthesis ===
In 2015 a consortium of 12 laboratories in eight countries developed a cultivar that displayed a rudimentary form of C4 photosynthesis (C4P) to boost growth by capturing carbon dioxide and concentrated it in specialized leaf cells. C4P is the reason corn and sugarcane grow so rapidly. Engineering C4 photosynthesis into rice could increase yields per hectare by roughly 50 percent. The current cultivar still relies primarily on C3 photosynthesis. To get them to completely adopt C4P, the plants must produce specialized cells in a precise arrangement: one set of cells to capture the carbon dioxide and to surround other cells that concentrate it. Some (possibly dozens of) genes involved in producing these cells remain to be identified. Other C3P crops that could exploit such knowledge include wheat, potatoes, tomatoes, apples and soybeans.

=== Production of recombinant proteins ===
Human serum albumin (HSA) is a blood protein in human blood plasma. It is used to treat severe burns, liver cirrhosis and hemorrhagic shock. It is also used in donated blood and is in short supply around the world. In China, scientists modified brown rice as a cost-effective way to produce HSA protein. The Chinese scientists put recombinant HSA protein promoters into 25 rice plants using Agrobacterium. Out of the 25 plants, nine contained the HSA protein. The genetically modified brown rice makes the same amino acid sequence as HSA. They called this protein Oryza sativa recombinant HSA (OsrHSA). The modified rice was transparent. OsrHSA was soon sold to replace cow albumin for growing cells. Clinical trials were started in China in 2017, and in the US in 2019. The same Oryzogen company makes other recombinant human proteins from rice.

Ventria Bioscience uses a proprietary system known as Express Tec for producing recombinant human proteins in rice grains. Their most notable variety produces human Lactoferrin and Lysozyme. These two proteins are produced naturally in human breast milk and are used globally in infant formula and rehydration products.

=== Submergence resistance ===
While rice grows in water, it cannot survive floods which in 2010 led to loss of 4 millions of tons of rice in India and Bangladesh alone. Addition of a single gene Sub1A was sufficient to allow rice to survive underwater for up to two weeks. The gene is in the public domain.

=== Salt tolerance ===
Salt-tolerant rice has been successfully cultivated in soils containing 4 grams of salt per kilogram. This involved tweaking the interaction of two genes.

=== Experimental ===
Herbicide-induced oxidative stress has been experimentally mitigated in vivo in a high-melatonin transgenic model. Overexpression of oxalate oxidase increased in vivo resistance to Rhizoctonia solani.

== Legal issues ==
=== United States ===
In the summer of 2006, the USDA detected trace amounts of LibertyLink variety 601 in rice shipments ready for export. LL601 was not approved for food purposes. Bayer applied for deregulation of LL601 in late July and the USDA granted deregulation status in November 2006. The contamination led to a dramatic dip in rice futures markets with losses to farmers who grew rice for export. Approximately 30 percent of rice production and 11,000 farmers in Arkansas, Louisiana, Mississippi, Missouri and Texas were affected. In June 2011 Bayer agreed to pay $750 million in damages and lost harvests. Japan and Russia suspended rice imports from the U.S., while Mexico and the European Union refused to impose strict testing. The contamination occurred between 1998 and 2001. The exact cause of the contamination was not discovered.

=== China ===
The Chinese government does not issue commercial usage licenses for genetically modified rice. All GM rice is approved for research only. Pu, et al., stated that rice engineered to produce human blood protein (HSA) requires a lot of modified rice to be grown. This raised environmental safety concerns about gene flow. They argued that this would not be a problem because rice is a self-pollinating crop, and their test showed less than 1% of the modified gene transferred in pollination. Another study suggested that insect-mediated gene flow may be higher than previously assumed.

== General and cited sources ==
- Boyle, Rebecca (1 November 2011). "Rice Is Genetically Modified to Produce Human Blood Protein". POPSCI.com. Popular Science.
- Weller, Keith (23 May 2006). "Rice Collection Identifies Valuable Traits". USDA.gov. United States Department of Agriculture.
- Grusak, Michael A (28 April 2010). "ARS Photo Library". USDA.gov. United States Department of Agriculture.
- Sharma, Arun K.; Sharma, Manoj K. (2009). "Plants as Bioreactors: Recent Developments and Emerging Opportunities". Biotechnology Advances. 27 (6): 811–832. Bibcode:2009BiotA..27..811S. doi:10.1016/j.biotechadv.2009.06.004. PMC 7125752. PMID 19576278.
- Diao, X; Freeling, M; Lisch, D (2006). "Horizontal Transfer of a Plant Transposon". PLOS Biology. 4 (1) e5. doi:10.1371/journal.pbio.0040005. PMC 1310652. PMID 16336045.
- Gray, Nathan (2011). "GM Rice Research May Give Hope to Micronutrient Deficient (September/October, 2011)". NutraIngredients.com.
