= Biolex =

Former American biotechnology firm

Logo

Biolex Therapeutics was a biotechnology firm in the Research Triangle of North Carolina which was founded in 1997 and raised $190 million from investors. It filed for Chapter 7 bankruptcy on July 5, 2012.

The company focused on expression of difficult-to-synthesize recombinant proteins in its LEX platform, which used Lemna, a duckweed. The duckweeds are a family of small aquatic plants that can be grown in sterile culture. Biolex developed recombinant DNA technology for efficiently producing pharmaceutical proteins in Lemna. Therapeutic glycosylated proteins, including monoclonal antibodies and interferon (IFN-alpha2b) have been produced using the LEX platform.

Biolex acquired Epicyte Pharmaceutical Inc. on May 6, 2004, and acquired the LemnaGene SA of Lyon, France in 2005. Biolex was a privately held company, originally backed by Quaker BioVentures, The Trelys Funds, and Polaris Venture Partners. The term "plantibody" is trademarked by Biolex. In May 2012 Biolex announced that it sold the LEX System to Synthon, a Netherlands-based specialty pharmaceutical company. The sale included two preclinical biologics made with the LEX System, BLX-301, a humanized and glyco-optimized anti-CD20 antibody for non-Hodgkin's B-cell lymphoma and other B-cell malignancies and BLX-155, a direct-acting thrombolytic. The financial terms of the sale were not disclosed.
