= T7 expression system =

Method for cloning recombinant DNA

The T7 expression system is utilized in the field of microbiology to clone recombinant DNA using strains of E. coli. It is the most popular system for expressing recombinant proteins in E. coli.

By 2021, this system had been described in over 220,000 research publications.

== Development ==
The sequencing and annotating of the genome of the T7 bacteriophage took place in the 1980s at the U.S. Department of Energy's Brookhaven National Laboratory, under the senior biophysicist F. William Studier. Soon, the lab was able to clone the T7 RNA polymerase and use it, along with the powerful T7 promoter, to transcribe copious amounts of almost any gene. The development of the T7 expression system has been considered the most successful biotechnology developed at the Brookhaven National Laboratory, being licensed by over 900 companies which has generated over $55 million for the lab.

== Mechanism ==
An expression vector, most commonly the pET expression vector, is engineered to integrate two essential components: a T7 promoter and a gene of interest downstream of the promoter and under its control. The expression vector is transformed into one of several relevant strains of E. coli, most frequently BL21(DE3). The E. coli cell also has its own genome, which possesses a gene that is expressed to produce T7 RNA polymerase. (This polymerase originates from the T7 phage, a strictly lytic bacteriophage virus which infects E. coli and hijacks its cellular machinery to replicate and lyse the host cell. In BL21(DE3), the T7 RNA polymerase gene is carried on a λDE3 prophage, which is a modified lambda phage, integrated into the E. coli chromosome under control of the lacUV5 promoter.) T7 RNA polymerase is responsible for beginning transcription at the T7 promoter of the transformed vector. The T7 gene is itself under the control of a lac promoter. Normally, both the lac promoter and the T7 promoter are repressed in the E. coli cell by the Lac repressor. In order to initiate transcription, an inducer must bind to the lac repressor and prevent it from inhibiting the gene expression of the T7 gene. Once this happens, the gene can be normally transcribed to produce T7 RNA polymerase. T7 RNA polymerase, in turn, can bind to the T7 promoter on the expression vector and begin transcribing its downstream gene of interest. To stimulate this process, the inducer IPTG can be added to the system. IPTG is a reagent that mimics the structure of allolactose, and can therefore bind to the lac repressor and prevent it from inhibiting gene expression. Once enough IPTG is added, the T7 gene is normally transcribed, and so transcription of the gene of interest downstream of the T7 promoter also begins. Alternative strategies include autoinduction media with other bacterial strains that can induce protein expression without adding IPTG to the medium. Expression of a recombinant protein under the control of the T7 promoter is 8x faster than protein expression under the control of E. coli RNA polymerase. Basal levels of expression of T7 RNA polymerase in the cell are also inhibited by the bacteriophage T7 lysozyme, which results in a delay of the accumulation of T7 RNA polymerase until after lysozyme activity is saturated.

== Application ==
During the COVID-19 pandemic, mRNA vaccines have been developed by Moderna and Pfizer to combat the spread of the virus. Both Moderna and Pfizer have relied on the T7 expression system to generate the large quantities of mRNA needed to manufacture the vaccines.
