= Myceliophthora thermophila =

Scientific classification
- Kingdom: Fungi
- Division: Ascomycota
- Class: Sordariomycetes
- Order: Sordariales
- Family: Chaetomiaceae
- Genus: Myceliophthora
- Species: M. thermophila

Binomial name
- Myceliophthora thermophila (A.E. Apinis) C.A. van Oorschot, 1977

Synonyms
- Chrysosporium thermophilum (A.E. Apinis) A. von Klopotek, 1974; Sporotrichum thermophile A.E. Apinis, 1963; Thielavia heterothallica A. von Klopotek, 1976; Corynascus heterothallicus (A. von Klopotek) J.A. von Arx et al., 1983

Species of fungus

Myceliophthora thermophila is an ascomycete fungus that grows optimally at 45–50 °C (113–122 °F). It efficiently degrades cellulose and is of interest in the production of biofuels. The genome has recently been sequenced, revealing the full range of enzymes used by this organism for the degradation of plant cell wall material.

== Taxonomy ==
Myceliophthora thermophila has a wide range of synonyms over the history of its classification and distinction of sexual states. Myceliophthora thermophila was originally described as Sporotrichum thermophilum in 1963, but it was later found that the species lacked clamp connections characteristic of the basidiomycetous genus, Sporotrichum. It was reclassified to the ascomycetous genus, Chrysosporium, and became known as C. thermophilum. The genus Myceliophthora was not used to describe this species until 1977, since the genus Chrysosporium formerly encompassed the genus Myceliophthora,

The teleomorph to M. thermophila first described as Thielavia heterothallica before the genus Corynascus was introduced by von Arx in 1983. It has since been known as Corynascus heterothallicus, which has been observed through phylogenetic analysis to bear very strong DNA sequence homology to M. thermophila.

== Ecology ==
As its name implies, M. thermophila is a thermophilic fungus, growing optimally at 38-45 °C but not above 60 °C. Myceliophthora thermophila colonies have been commonly isolated from composts, where they generate high temperatures from cellular activities. Moist, sun-heated soils and hay provide ideal places for M. thermophila growth because they do not easily dissipate heat and help insulate the colony. Due to the scarcity of soluble carbon sources at high temperatures, this species is well adapted to utilizing insoluble carbon sources for energy, such as cellulose and hemicellulose.

== Morphology ==
Colonies of M. thermophila initially appear cottony-pink, but rapidly turn cinnamon-brown and granular in texture. It can be distinguished from the closely related Myceliophthora lutea by the thermophilic character of the former, and its more darkly pigmented, markedly obovate conidia. Microscopic examination reveals septate hyphae with several obovoidal to pyriform conidia arising singly or in small groups from conidiogenous cells. Conidia are typically 3.0-4.5μm x 4.5-11.0μm in size, hyaline, smooth, and thick-walled. Occasionally a secondary conidium can form at the distal tip of primary conidium.

== Human disease ==
Myceliopthora thermophila is rarely implicated in human disease; however, there have been several reported cases of M. thermophila causing disseminated infections in people with pre-existing immunodeficiency such as myeloblastic leukemia. Infections can occur by direct inoculation into the body by contaminated surgical or garden tools, and tend to manifest themselves in cardiovascular and respiratory systems. Voriconazole is an effective treatment for the infection, however, misdiagnoses for M. thermophila are possible due to its tendency to test positive on invasive aspergillosis screens.

== Industrial uses ==
The genome of M. thermophila encodes a number of thermostable enzymes with important industrial applications. Because of its ability to grow at high temperature, its enzyme yield is greater with fewer contaminants than many mesophilic fungi.

Cellulases are rapidly synthesized by M. thermophila and can be used to degrade cellulose into simple carbohydrates as a food source for livestock. Also expressed by this species are broad-specificity phytases that are efficient in breaking down phytic acid to be used for supplementing livestock feed with phosphorus.

Myceliophthora thermophila expresses laccases that can act as clean substitutes for harmful chemical reagents used in the paper and pulp industry and textile dyes. They are also useful in ecological restoration through soil bioremediation and ability to degrade rubber. Furthermore, laccases have shown to have the ability to polymerize lignin from waste material from the kraft process. The homogeneous lignin polymer may be used as raw materials for other products.
