= T7 RNA polymerase =

Class of enzymes

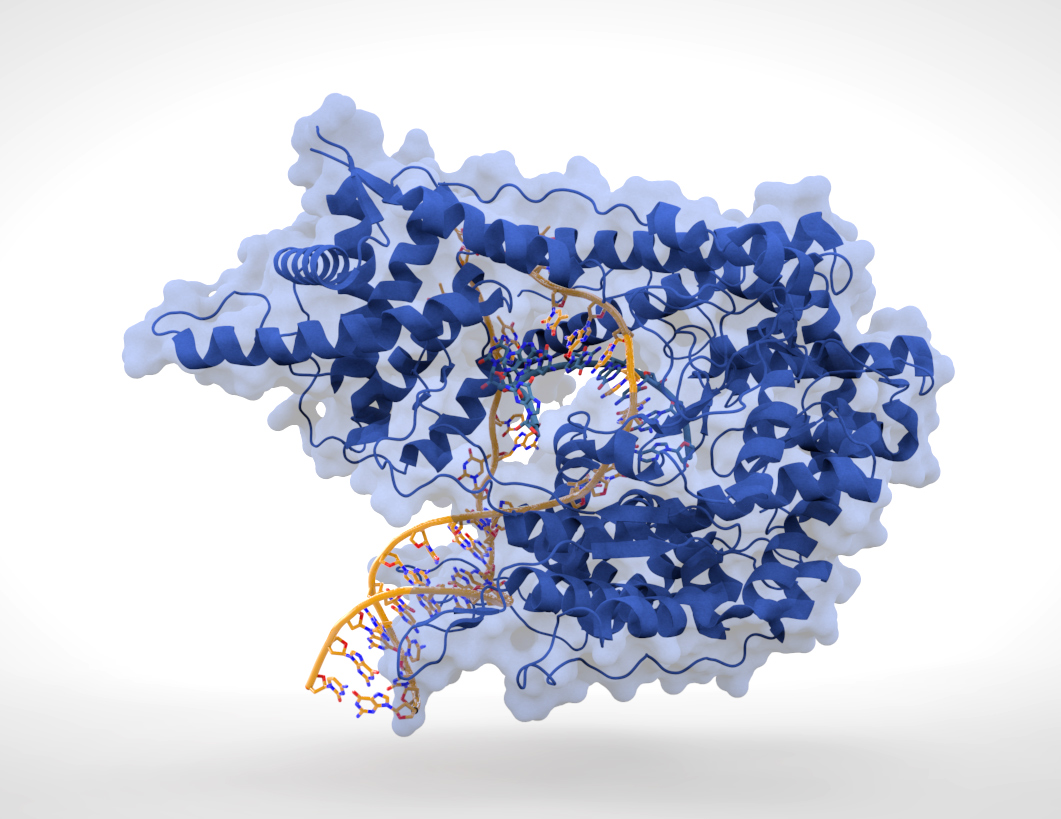
- T7 RNA Polymerase (blue) producing mRNA (light-blue) from a double-stranded DNA template (orange).

Identifiers
- Organism: T7 phage
- Symbol: 1
- Orthologs: OMA: entry
- PDB: 1MSW
- UniProt: P00573
Search for
- Structures: Swiss-model
- Domains: InterPro

T7 RNA Polymerase is an RNA polymerase from the T7 bacteriophage that catalyzes the formation of RNA from DNA in the 5'→ 3' direction.

== Activity ==
T7 polymerase is extremely promoter-specific and transcribes only DNA downstream of a T7 promoter. The T7 polymerase also requires a double stranded DNA template and Mg^{2+} ion as cofactor for the synthesis of RNA. It has a very low error rate. T7 polymerase has a molecular weight of 99 kDa.

=== Promoter ===
The promoter is recognized for binding and initiation of the transcription. The consensus in T7 and related phages is:

5'                    *      3'
T7   TAATACGACTCACTATAGGGAGA
T3   AATTAACCCTCACTAAAGGGAGA
K11  AATTAGGGCACACTATAGGGAGA
SP6  ATTTACGACACACTATAGAAGAA
  bind------------
                 -----------init

Transcription begins at the asterisk-marked guanine.

== Structure ==
T7 polymerase has been crystallised in several forms and the structures placed in the PDB. These explain how T7 polymerase binds to DNA and transcribes it. The N-terminal domain moves around as the elongation complex forms. The ssRNAP holds a DNA-RNA hybrid of 8bp. A beta-hairpin specificity loop (residues 739-770 in T7) recognizes the promoter; swapping it out for one found in T3 RNAP makes the polymerase recognize T3 promoters instead.

Similar to other viral nucleic acid polymerases, including T7 DNA polymerase from the same phage, the conserved C-terminal of T7 ssRNAP employs a fold whose organization has been likened to the shape of a right hand with three subdomains termed fingers, palm, and thumb. The N-terminal is less conserved. It forms a promoter-binding domain (PBD) with helix bundles in phage ssRNAPs, a feature not found in mitochondrial ssRNAPs.

== Related proteins ==
DNA-directed RNA polymerase, phage-type

Identifiers
- Symbol: RNA_pol
- Pfam: PF00940
- InterPro: IPR002092
- SCOP2: 1msw / SCOPe / SUPFAM
Available protein structures:
- PDB: IPR002092 PF00940 (ECOD; PDBsum)
- AlphaFold: IPR002092; PF00940

T7 polymerase is a representative member of the single-subunit DNA-dependent RNAP (ssRNAP) family. Other members include phage T3 and SP6 RNA polymerases, the mitochondrial RNA polymerase (POLRMT), and the chloroplastic ssRNAP. The ssRNAP family is structurally and evolutionarily distinct from the multi-subunit family of RNA polymerases (including bacterial and eukaryotic sub-families). In contrast to bacterial RNA polymerases, T7 polymerase is not inhibited by the antibiotic rifampicin. This family is related to single-subunit reverse transcriptase and DNA polymerase.

== Application ==
In biotechnology applications, T7 RNA polymerase is commonly used to transcribe DNA that has been cloned into vectors that have two (different) phage promoters (e.g., T7 and T3, or T7 and SP6) in opposite orientation. RNA can be selectively synthesized from either strand of the insert DNA with the different polymerases. Linearized plasmids or PCR products can be used as a DNA template. The enzyme is stimulated by spermidine and in vitro activity is increased by the presence of carrier proteins (such as BSA).

Homogeneously labeled single-stranded RNA can be generated with this system. Transcripts can be non-radioactively labeled to high specific activity with certain labeled nucleotides.

T7 RNA polymerase is used in the synthesis of mRNA and sgRNA. Transcripts that are generated via T7 RNA polymerase typically have Guanosine as the +1 and +2 bases to increase yield, although alternative promoter sequences to include adenine as the first nucleotide are also available. For mRNA, the transcripts can be co-transcriptionally capped by including a mRNA cap structure analog in the transcription reaction.

== See also ==
- T7 expression system
