= NS0 cell =

NS0 cells are a model cell line derived from the nonsecreting murine myeloma used in biomedical research and commercially in the production of therapeutic proteins. The cell line is a cholesterol-dependent cell line that was generated from a subline of NSI/1 which produced only the light chain but no heavy chain.

== Cell line development ==
Development of murine neoplasms started with work with the BALB/c mice to isolate the IgG1 secreting MOPC21 tumor. From this tumor, the P3K cells were isolated and developed into two cell lines, 289-16 and P3-X63. The 289-16 cell line secreted only light chain and no heavy chain and was renamed NSI/1. Clones from that cell line were isolated and a nonsecreting cell line was identified and was named NS0/1.

== Uses in biotechnology ==
As myeloma cells, NSo cells are naturally antibody-producing suspension cells with a lymphoblast morphology. Gene amplification is typically performed using GS-transfected NS0 cells to select for producing cell lines. The GS-NS0 is a heterologous mammalian expression system that allows for the rapid expression of recombinant proteins. Several therapeutic antibody products are produced using the NS0 cell line including daclizumab and eculizumab.
