= Biopharmaceutical =

Drug made from biological source

A biopharmaceutical, also known as a biological medical product, or biologic, is any pharmaceutical drug product manufactured in, extracted from, or semisynthesized from biological sources. Different from totally synthesized pharmaceuticals, they include vaccines, whole blood, blood components, allergenics, somatic cells, gene therapies, tissues, recombinant therapeutic protein, monoclonal antibodies, and living medicines used in cell therapy. Biopharmaceuticals can be composed of sugars, proteins, nucleic acids, or complex combinations of these substances, or may be living cells or tissues. They (or their precursors or components) are isolated from living sources—human, animal, plant, fungal, or microbial. They can be used in both human and animal medicine.

Terminology surrounding biopharmaceuticals varies between groups and entities, with different terms referring to different subsets of therapeutics within the general biopharmaceutical category. The term biologics is often used more restrictively to mean biopharmaceuticals that are produced using recombinant DNA technology. Some regulatory agencies use the terms biological medicinal products or therapeutic biological product to refer specifically to engineered macromolecular products like protein- and nucleic acid-based drugs, distinguishing them from products like blood, blood components, or vaccines, which are usually extracted directly from a biological source. Biopharmaceutics is pharmaceutics that works with biopharmaceuticals. Biopharmacology is the branch of pharmacology that studies biopharmaceuticals. Specialty drugs, a recent classification of pharmaceuticals, are high-cost drugs that are often biologics. The European Medicines Agency uses the term advanced therapy medicinal products (ATMPs) for medicines for human use that are "based on genes, cells, or tissue engineering", including gene therapy medicines, somatic-cell therapy medicines, tissue-engineered medicines, and combinations thereof. Within EMA contexts, the term advanced therapies refers specifically to ATMPs, although that term is rather nonspecific outside those contexts.

Gene-based and cellular biologics, for example, often are at the forefront of biomedicine and biomedical research, and may be used to treat a variety of medical conditions for which no other treatments are available.

Building on the market approvals and sales of recombinant virus-based biopharmaceuticals for veterinary and human medicine, the use of engineered plant viruses has been proposed to enhance crop performance and promote sustainable production.

In some jurisdictions, biologics are regulated via different pathways from other small molecule drugs and medical devices.

== Major classes ==
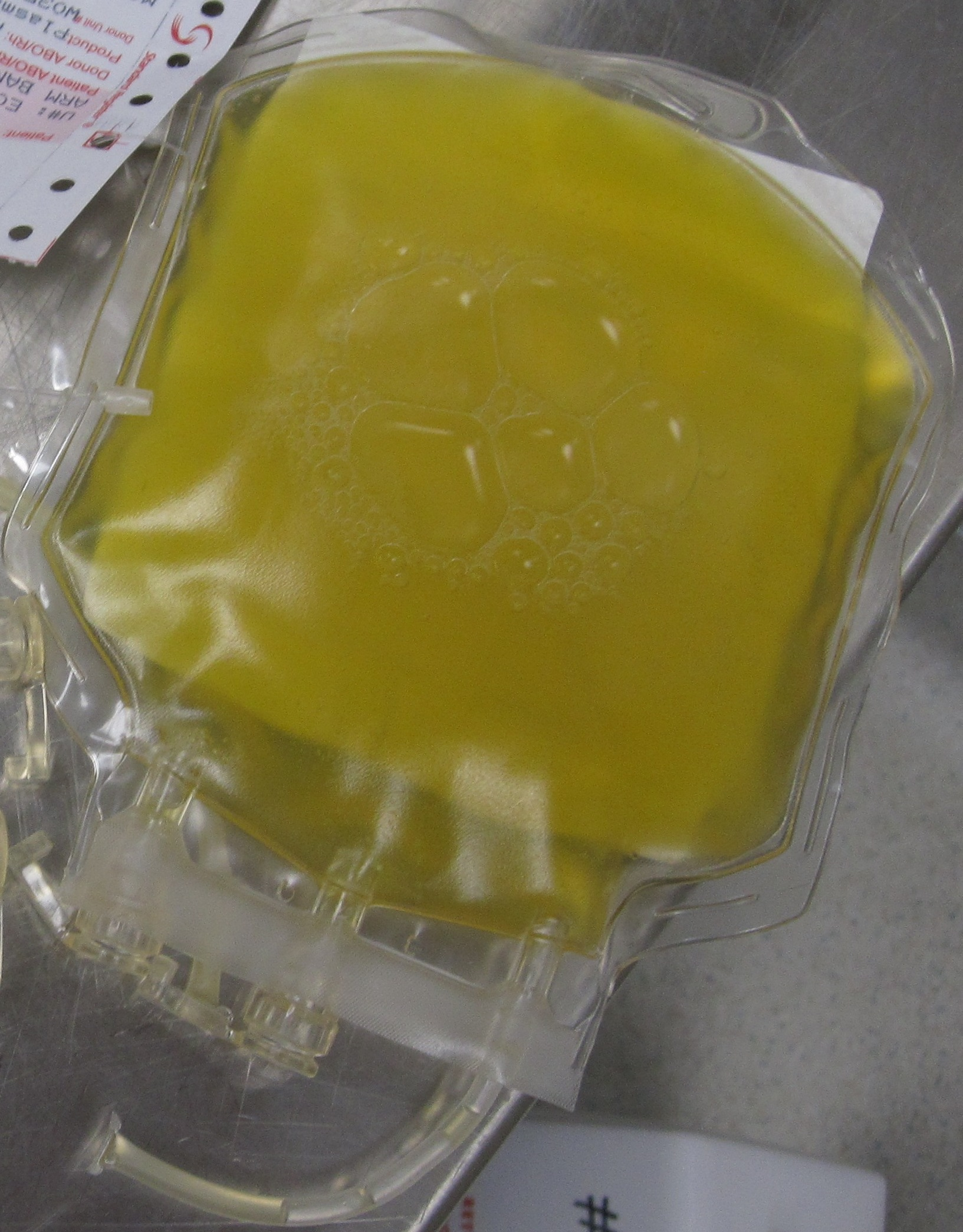
Blood plasma is a type of biopharmaceutical directly extracted from living systems.

=== Extracted from living systems ===
Some of the oldest forms of biologics are extracted from the bodies of animals, and other humans especially. Important biologics include:

- Whole blood and other blood components
- Organ transplantation and tissue transplants
- Stem-cell therapy
- Antibodies for passive immunity (e.g., to treat a virus infection)
- Human reproductive cells
- Human breast milk
- Fecal microbiota

Some biologics that were previously extracted from animals, such as insulin, are now more commonly produced by recombinant DNA.

=== Produced by recombinant DNA ===
Biologics can refer to a wide range of biological products in medicine. However, in most cases, the term is used more restrictively for a class of therapeutics (either approved or in development) that are produced using biological processes involving recombinant DNA technology. These medications are usually one of three types:

1. Substances that are (nearly) identical to the body's key signaling proteins. Examples are the blood-production stimulating protein erythropoetin, or the growth-stimulating hormone named "growth hormone" or biosynthetic human insulin and its analogues.
2. Monoclonal antibodies. These are similar to the antibodies that the human immune system uses to fight off bacteria and viruses, but they are "custom-designed" (using hybridoma technology or other methods) and can therefore be made specifically to counteract or block any given substance in the body, or to target any specific cell type; examples of such monoclonal antibodies for use in various diseases are given in the table below.
3. Receptor constructs (fusion proteins), usually based on a naturally occurring receptor linked to the immunoglobulin frame. In this case, the receptor provides the construct with detailed specificity, whereas the immunoglobulin structure imparts stability and other useful features in terms of pharmacology. Some examples are listed in the table below.

Biologics as a class of medications in this narrower sense have had a profound impact on many medical fields, primarily rheumatology and oncology, but also cardiology, dermatology, gastroenterology, neurology, and others. In most of these disciplines, biologics have added major therapeutic options for treating many diseases, including some for which no effective therapies were available, and others where previously existing therapies were inadequate. However, the advent of biologic therapeutics has also raised complex regulatory issues (see below), and significant pharmacoeconomic concerns because the cost for biologic therapies has been dramatically higher than for conventional (pharmacological) medications. This factor has been particularly relevant since many biological medications are used to treat chronic diseases, such as rheumatoid arthritis or inflammatory bowel disease, or for the treatment of otherwise untreatable cancer during the remainder of life. The cost of treatment with a typical monoclonal antibody therapy for relatively common indications is generally in the range of €7,000–14,000 per patient per year.

Older patients who receive biologic therapy for diseases such as rheumatoid arthritis, psoriatic arthritis, or ankylosing spondylitis are at increased risk for life-threatening infection, adverse cardiovascular events, and malignancy.

The first such substance approved for therapeutic use was biosynthetic "human" insulin made via recombinant DNA. Sometimes referred to as rHI, under the trade name Humulin, was developed by Genentech, but licensed to Eli Lilly and Company, who manufactured and marketed it starting in 1982.

Major kinds of biopharmaceuticals include:

- Blood factors (Factor VIII and Factor IX)
- Thrombolytic agents (tissue plasminogen activator)
- Hormones (insulin, glucagon, growth hormone, gonadotrophins)
- Haematopoietic growth factors (Erythropoietin, colony-stimulating factors)
- Interferons (Interferons-α, -β, -γ)
- Interleukin-based products (Interleukin-2)
- Vaccines (Hepatitis B surface antigen)
- Monoclonal antibodies (Various)
- Additional products (tumour necrosis factor, therapeutic enzymes)

Research and development investment in new medicines by the biopharmaceutical industry stood at $65.2 billion in 2008. A few examples of biologics made with recombinant DNA technology include:

USAN/INN	Trade name	Indication	Technology	Mechanism of action
abatacept	Orencia	rheumatoid arthritis	immunoglobin CTLA-4 fusion protein	T-cell deactivation
adalimumab	Humira	rheumatoid arthritis, ankylosing spondylitis, psoriatic arthritis, psoriasis, ulcerative colitis, Crohn's disease	monoclonal antibody	TNF antagonist
alefacept	Amevive	chronic plaque psoriasis	immunoglobin G1 fusion protein	incompletely characterized
erythropoietin	Epogen	anemia arising from cancer chemotherapy, chronic renal failure, etc.	recombinant protein	stimulation of red blood cell production
etanercept	Enbrel	rheumatoid arthritis, ankylosing spondylitis, psoriatic arthritis, psoriasis	recombinant human TNF-receptor fusion protein	TNF antagonist
infliximab	Remicade	rheumatoid arthritis, ankylosing spondylitis, psoriatic arthritis, psoriasis, ulcerative colitis, Crohn's disease	monoclonal antibody	TNF antagonist
trastuzumab	Herceptin	breast cancer	humanized monoclonal antibody	HER2/neu (erbB2) antagonist
ustekinumab	Stelara	psoriatic arthritis, psoriasis, ulcerative colitis, Crohn's disease	humanized monoclonal antibody	IL-12 and IL-23 antagonist
denileukin diftitox	Ontak	cutaneous T-cell lymphoma (CTCL)	Diphtheria toxin engineered protein combining Interleukin-2 and Diphtheria toxin	Interleukin-2 receptor binder
golimumab	Simponi	rheumatoid arthritis, psoriatic arthritis, ankylosing spondylitis, ulcerative colitis	monoclonal antibody	TNF antagonist
vedolizumab	Entyvio	ulcerative colitis, Crohn's disease	monoclonal antibody	α_{4}β_{7} integrin blocker
ixekizumab	Taltz	plaque psoriasis, psoriatic arthritis, ankylosing spondylitis, non-radiographic axial spondyloarthritis	humanized monoclonal antibody	IL-17A neutralizer

=== Vaccines ===
Many vaccines are grown in tissue cultures.

=== Gene therapy ===
Viral gene therapy involves artificially manipulating a virus to include a desirable piece of genetic material.

Viral gene therapies using engineered plant viruses have been proposed to enhance crop performance and promote sustainable production.

== Biosimilars ==
With the expiration of many patents for blockbuster biologics between 2012 and 2019, the interest in biosimilar production, i.e., follow-on biologics, has increased. Compared to small molecules that consist of chemically identical active ingredients, biologics are vastly more complex and consist of a multitude of subspecies. Due to their heterogeneity and the high process sensitivity, originators and follow-on biosimilars will exhibit variability in specific variants over time. The safety and clinical performance of both originator and biosimilar biopharmaceuticals must remain equivalent throughout their lifecycle. Process variations are monitored by modern analytical tools (e.g., liquid chromatography, immunoassays, mass spectrometry, etc.) and describe a unique design space for each biologic.

Biosimilars require a different regulatory framework compared to small-molecule generics. Legislation in the 21st century has addressed this by recognizing an intermediate ground of testing for biosimilars. The filing pathway requires more testing than for small-molecule generics, but less testing than for registering completely new therapeutics.

In 2003, the European Medicines Agency introduced an adapted pathway for biosimilars, termed similar biological medicinal products. This pathway is based on a thorough demonstration of comparability of the product to an existing approved product. Within the United States, the Patient Protection and Affordable Care Act of 2010 created an abbreviated approval pathway for biological products shown to be biosimilar to, or interchangeable with, an FDA-licensed reference biological product. Researchers are optimistic that the introduction of biosimilars will reduce medical expenses to patients and the healthcare system.

== Commercialization ==
When a new biopharmaceutical is developed, the company will typically apply for a patent, which is a grant to exclusive manufacturing rights. This is the primary means by which the drug developer can recover the investment cost for development of the biopharmaceutical. The patent laws in the United States and Europe differ somewhat on the requirements for a patent, with the European requirements perceived as more difficult to satisfy. The total number of patents granted for biopharmaceuticals has risen significantly since the 1970s. In 1978 the total patents granted was 30. This had climbed to 15,600 in 1995, and by 2001 there were 34,527 patent applications. Blood products and other human-derived biologics such as breast milk have highly regulated or very hard-to-access markets; therefore, customers generally face a supply shortage for these products. Institutions housing these biologics, designated as 'banks', often cannot distribute their product to customers effectively. Conversely, banks for reproductive cells are much more widespread and available due to the ease with which spermatozoa and egg cells can be used for fertility treatment.

== Large-scale production ==
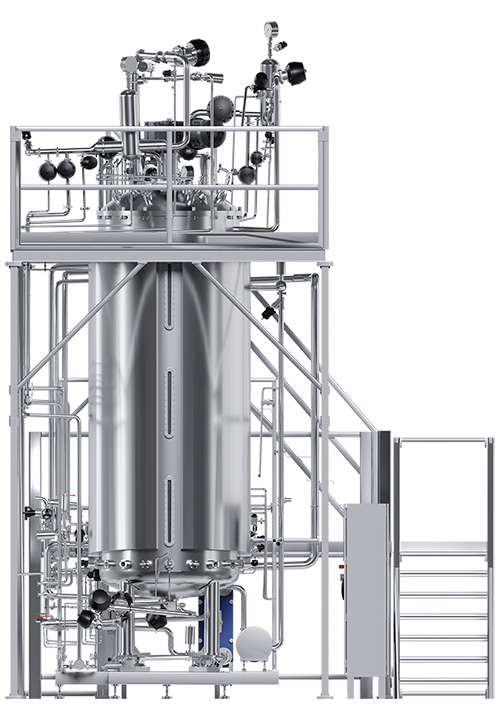
Stainless steel bioreactor for production plants

Biopharmaceuticals may be produced from microbial cells (e.g., recombinant E. coli or yeast cultures), mammalian cell lines (see Cell culture) and plant cell cultures (see Plant tissue culture) and moss plants in bioreactors of various configurations, including photo-bioreactors. Important issues of concern are cost of production (low-volume, high-purity products are desirable) and microbial contamination (by bacteria, viruses, mycoplasma). Alternative platforms of production which are being tested include whole plants (plant-made pharmaceuticals).

=== Transgenics ===
A potentially controversial method of producing biopharmaceuticals involves transgenic organisms, particularly plants and animals that have been genetically modified to produce drugs. This production is a significant risk for its investor due to production failure or scrutiny from regulatory bodies based on perceived risks and ethical issues. Biopharmaceutical crops also represent a risk of cross-contamination with non-engineered crops, or crops engineered for non-medical purposes.

One potential approach to this technology is the creation of a transgenic mammal that can produce the biopharmaceutical in its milk, blood, or urine. Once an animal is produced, typically using the pronuclear microinjection method, it becomes efficacious to use cloning technology to create additional offspring that carry the favorable modified genome. The first such drug manufactured from the milk of a genetically modified goat was ATryn, but marketing permission was blocked by the European Medicines Agency in February 2006. This decision was reversed in June 2006 and approval was given August 2006.

== Regulation ==
=== European Union ===
In the European Union, a biological medicinal product is one of the active substance(s) produced from or extracted from a biological (living) system, and requires, in addition to physicochemical testing, biological testing for full characterisation. The characterisation of a biological medicinal product is a combination of testing the active substance and the final medicinal product together with the production process and its control. For example:

- Production process – it can be derived from biotechnology or from other technologies. It may be prepared using more conventional techniques as is the case for blood or plasma-derived products and a number of vaccines.
- Active substance – consisting of entire microorganisms, mammalian cells, nucleic acids, proteinaceous, or polysaccharide components originating from a microbial, animal, human, or plant source.
- Mode of action – therapeutic and immunological medicinal products, gene transfer materials, or cell therapy materials.

=== United States ===
In the United States, biologics are licensed through the biologics license application (BLA), then submitted to and regulated by the FDA's Center for Biologics Evaluation and Research (CBER) whereas drugs are regulated by the Center for Drug Evaluation and Research. Approval may require several years of clinical trials, including trials with human volunteers. Even after the drug is released, it will still be monitored for performance and safety risks. The manufacture process must satisfy the FDA's "Good Manufacturing Practices", which are typically manufactured in a cleanroom environment with strict limits on the amount of airborne particles and other microbial contaminants that may alter the efficacy of the drug.

=== Canada ===
In Canada, biologics (and radiopharmaceuticals) are reviewed through the Biologics and Genetic Therapies Directorate within Health Canada.

== See also ==
- Antibody-drug conjugate
- Genetic engineering
- Host cell protein
- List of pharmaceutical companies
- List of recombinant proteins
- Nanomedicine
