= ATryn =

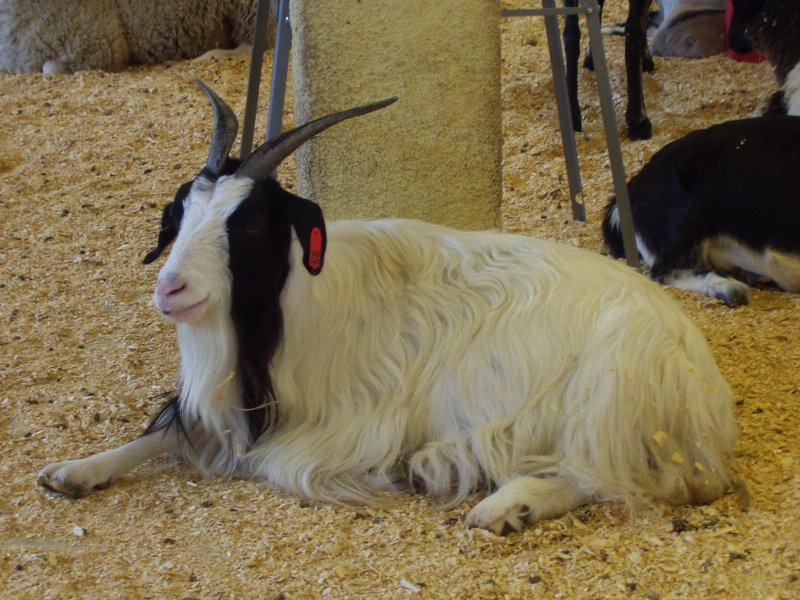
Angora goat at the Texas State Fair.

ATryn is the brand name of the anticoagulant antithrombin manufactured by the Massachusetts-based U.S. company rEVO Biologics (formerly known as GTC Biotherapeutics). It is made from the milk of goats that have been genetically modified to produce human antithrombin, a plasma protein with anticoagulant properties. Microinjection was used to insert human antithrombin genes into the cell nucleus of their embryos. ATryn is the first medicine produced using genetically engineered animals. GTC states that one genetically modified goat can produce the same amount of antithrombin in a year as 90,000 blood donations. GTC chose goats for the process because they reproduce more rapidly than cattle and produce more protein than rabbits or mice.

On February 6, 2009, ATryn was approved by the U.S. Food and Drug Administration (FDA) for treatment of patients with hereditary antithrombin deficiency who are undergoing surgical or childbirth procedures. Along with the approval from the FDA's pharmaceutical regulatory board, the Center for Veterinary Medicine of the FDA also approved the genetic makeup of the goats that are used to manufacture ATryn. rEVO has the sole rights to sell ATryn in the United States, and the drug is available in the U.S. market. Earlier in 2006, the European Medicines Agency (EMA) initially rejected and, after an appeal from GTC, approved the drug for use in the European Union countries.

According to Tom Newberry, the spokesperson for GTC, the company plans to acquire additional approval for treatment of those with non-hereditary antithrombin deficiency.

The Humane Society of the United States has said of the process used to manufacture ATryn, "It is a mechanistic use of animals that seems to perpetuate the notion of their being merely tools for human use rather than sentient creatures." However, the genetic changes have no known ill-effects on the host animal.
