= Recombinant DNA =

DNA molecules formed by human agency at a molecular level generating novel DNA sequences

Construction of recombinant DNA, in which a foreign DNA fragment is inserted into a plasmid vector. In this example, the gene indicated by the white color is inactivated upon insertion of the foreign DNA fragment.

Recombinant DNA (rDNA) molecules are DNA molecules formed by laboratory methods of genetic recombination (such as molecular cloning) that bring together genetic material from multiple sources, creating sequences that would not otherwise be found in the genome.

Recombinant DNA is the general name for a piece of DNA that has been created by combining two or more fragments from different sources. Recombinant DNA is possible because DNA molecules from all organisms share the same chemical structure, differing only in the nucleotide sequence. Recombinant DNA molecules are sometimes called chimeric DNA because they can be made of material from two different species like the mythical chimera. rDNA technology uses palindromic sequences and leads to the production of sticky and blunt ends.

The DNA sequences used in the construction of recombinant DNA molecules can originate from any species. For example, plant DNA can be joined to bacterial DNA, or human DNA can be joined with fungal DNA. In addition, DNA sequences that do not occur anywhere in nature can be created by the chemical synthesis of DNA and incorporated into recombinant DNA molecules. Using recombinant DNA technology and synthetic DNA, any DNA sequence can be created and introduced into living organisms.

Proteins that can result from the expression of recombinant DNA within living cells are termed recombinant proteins. When recombinant DNA encoding a protein is introduced into a host organism, the recombinant protein is not necessarily produced. Expression of foreign proteins requires the use of specialized expression vectors and often necessitates significant restructuring by foreign coding sequences.

Recombinant DNA differs from genetic recombination in that the former results from artificial methods while the latter is a normal biological process that results in the remixing of existing DNA sequences in essentially all organisms.

== Production ==

Molecular cloning is the laboratory process used to produce recombinant DNA. It is one of two most widely used methods, along with polymerase chain reaction (PCR), used to direct the replication of any specific DNA sequence chosen by the experimentalist. There are two fundamental differences between the methods. One is that molecular cloning involves replication of the DNA within a living cell, while PCR replicates DNA in the test tube, free of living cells. The other difference is that cloning involves cutting and pasting DNA sequences, while PCR amplifies by copying an existing sequence.

Formation of recombinant DNA requires a cloning vector, a DNA molecule that replicates within a living cell. Vectors are generally derived from plasmids or viruses, and represent relatively small segments of DNA that contain necessary genetic signals for replication, as well as additional elements for convenience in inserting foreign DNA, identifying cells that contain recombinant DNA, and, where appropriate, expressing the foreign DNA. The choice of vector for molecular cloning depends on the choice of host organism, the size of the DNA to be cloned, and whether and how the foreign DNA is to be expressed. The DNA segments can be combined by using a variety of methods, such as restriction enzyme/ligase cloning or Gibson assembly.

In standard cloning protocols, the cloning of any DNA fragment essentially involves seven steps: (1) Choice of host organism and cloning vector, (2) Preparation of vector DNA, (3) Preparation of DNA to be cloned, (4) Creation of recombinant DNA, (5) Introduction of recombinant DNA into the host organism, (6) Selection of organisms containing recombinant DNA, and (7) Screening for clones with desired DNA inserts and biological properties.

== DNA expression ==
DNA expression requires the transfection of suitable host cells. Typically, either bacterial, yeast, insect, or mammalian cells (such as human embryonic kidney cells or Chinese hamster ovary cells) are used as host cells.

Following transplantation into the host organism, the foreign DNA contained within the recombinant DNA construct may or may not be expressed. That is, the DNA may simply be replicated without expression, or it may be transcribed and translated and a recombinant protein is produced. Generally speaking, expression of a foreign gene requires restructuring the gene to include sequences that are required for producing an mRNA molecule that can be used by the host's translational apparatus (e.g. promoter, translational initiation signal, and transcriptional terminator). Specific changes to the host organism may be made to improve expression of the ectopic gene. In addition, changes may be needed to the coding sequences as well, to optimize translation, make the protein soluble, direct the recombinant protein to the proper cellular or extracellular location, and stabilize the protein from degradation.

== Properties of organisms containing recombinant DNA ==
In most cases, organisms containing recombinant DNA have apparently normal phenotypes. That is, their appearance, behavior and metabolism are usually unchanged, and the only way to demonstrate the presence of recombinant sequences is to examine the DNA itself, typically using a polymerase chain reaction (PCR) test. Significant exceptions exist, and are discussed below.

If the rDNA sequences encode a gene that is expressed, then the presence of RNA and/or protein products of the recombinant gene can be detected, typically using RT-PCR or western hybridization methods. Gross phenotypic changes are not the norm, unless the recombinant gene has been chosen and modified so as to generate biological activity in the host organism. Additional phenotypes that are encountered include toxicity to the host organism induced by the recombinant gene product, especially if it is over-expressed or expressed within inappropriate cells or tissues.

In some cases, recombinant DNA can have deleterious effects even if it is not expressed. One mechanism by which this happens is insertional inactivation, in which the rDNA becomes inserted into a host cell's gene. In some cases, researchers use this phenomenon to "knock out" genes to determine their biological function and importance. Another mechanism by which rDNA insertion into chromosomal DNA can affect gene expression is by inappropriate activation of previously unexpressed host cell genes. This can happen, for example, when a recombinant DNA fragment containing an active promoter becomes located next to a previously silent host cell gene, or when a host cell gene that functions to restrain gene expression undergoes insertional inactivation by recombinant DNA.

== Applications of recombinant DNA ==
Recombinant DNA is widely used in biotechnology, medicine and research. Today, recombinant proteins and other products that result from the use of DNA technology are found in essentially every pharmacy, physician or veterinarian office, medical testing laboratory, and biological research laboratory. In addition, organisms that have been manipulated using recombinant DNA technology, as well as products derived from those organisms, have found their way into many farms, supermarkets, home medicine cabinets, and even pet shops, such as those that sell GloFish and other genetically modified animals.

The most common application of recombinant DNA is in basic research, in which the technology is important to most current work in the biological and biomedical sciences. Recombinant DNA is used to identify, map and sequence genes, and to determine their function. rDNA probes are employed in analyzing gene expression within individual cells, and throughout the tissues of whole organisms. Recombinant proteins are widely used as reagents in laboratory experiments and to generate antibody probes for examining protein synthesis within cells and organisms.

Many additional practical applications of recombinant DNA are found in industry, food production, human and veterinary medicine, agriculture, and bioengineering. Some specific examples are identified below.

=== Recombinant chymosin ===
Found in rennet, chymosin is the enzyme responsible for hydrolysis of κ-casein to produce para-κ-casein and glycomacropeptide, which is the first step in formation of cheese, and subsequently curd, and whey. It was the first genetically engineered food additive used commercially. Traditionally, processors obtained chymosin from rennet, a preparation derived from the fourth stomach of milk-fed calves. Scientists engineered a non-pathogenic strain (K-12) of E. coli bacteria for large-scale laboratory production of the enzyme. This microbiologically produced recombinant enzyme, identical structurally to the calf derived enzyme, costs less and is produced in abundant quantities. Today about 60% of U.S. hard cheese is made with genetically engineered chymosin. In 1990, FDA granted chymosin "generally recognized as safe" (GRAS) status based on data showing that the enzyme was safe.

=== Recombinant human insulin ===
Recombinant human insulin has almost completely replaced insulin obtained from animal sources (e.g. pigs and cattle) for the treatment of type 1 diabetes. A variety of different recombinant insulin preparations are in widespread use. Recombinant insulin (insulin aspart) is synthesized by inserting the human insulin gene into E. coli or yeast (Saccharomyces cerevisiae), which then produces insulin for human use. Insulin produced by E. coli requires further post translational modifications (e.g. glycosylation) whereas yeasts are able to perform these modifications themselves by virtue of being more complex host organisms. The advantage of recombinant human insulin is after chronic use patients do not develop an immune defence against it the way animal-sourced insulin stimulates the human immune system.

=== Recombinant human growth hormone (HGH, somatotropin) ===
Human growth hormone is administered to patients whose pituitary glands generate insufficient quantities to support normal growth and development. Before recombinant HGH became available, HGH for therapeutic use was obtained from pituitary glands of cadavers. This unsafe practice led to some patients developing Creutzfeldt–Jakob disease. Recombinant HGH eliminated this problem, and is now used therapeutically. It has also been misused as a performance-enhancing drug by athletes and others.

=== Recombinant blood clotting factor VIII ===
Factor VIII is a blood-clotting protein that is administered to patients with the bleeding disorder hemophilia, who are unable to produce factor VIII in quantities sufficient to support normal blood coagulation. Before the development of recombinant factor VIII, the protein was obtained by processing large quantities of human blood from multiple donors, which carried a very high risk of transmission of blood borne infectious diseases, for example HIV and hepatitis B.

=== Recombinant hepatitis B vaccine ===
Hepatitis B infection can be successfully controlled through the use of a recombinant subunit hepatitis B vaccine, which contains a form of the hepatitis B virus surface antigen that is produced in yeast cells. The development of the recombinant subunit vaccine was an important and necessary development because hepatitis B virus, unlike other common viruses such as polio virus, cannot be grown in vitro.

=== Recombinant antibodies ===
Recombinant antibodies (rAbs) are produced in vitro by the means of expression systems based on mammalian cells. Their monospecific binding to a specific epitope makes rAbs eligible not only for research purposes, but also as therapy options against certain cancer types, infections and autoimmune diseases.

=== Diagnosis of HIV infection ===
Each of the three widely used methods for diagnosing HIV infection has been developed using recombinant DNA. The antibody test (ELISA or western blot) uses a recombinant HIV protein to test for the presence of antibodies that the body has produced in response to an HIV infection. The DNA test looks for the presence of HIV genetic material using reverse transcription polymerase chain reaction (RT-PCR). Development of the RT-PCR test was made possible by the molecular cloning and sequence analysis of HIV genomes. HIV testing page from US Centers for Disease Control (CDC)

=== Golden rice ===
Golden rice is a recombinant variety of rice that has been engineered to express the enzymes responsible for β-carotene biosynthesis. This variety of rice holds substantial promise for reducing the incidence of vitamin A deficiency in the world's population. Golden rice is not currently in use, pending the resolution of regulatory and intellectual property issues. The Philippines has approved Golden Rice for food, feed, and commercial propagation, but production has since been halted. Cultivation was paused following a 2024 Court of Appeals decision revoking its biosafety permit.

=== Herbicide-resistant crops ===
Commercial varieties of important agricultural crops (including soy, maize/corn, sorghum, canola, alfalfa and cotton) have been developed that incorporate a recombinant gene that results in resistance to the herbicide glyphosate (trade name Roundup), and simplifies weed control by glyphosate application. These crops are in common commercial use in several countries.

=== Insect-resistant crops ===
Bacillus thuringiensis is a bacterium that naturally produces a protein (Bt toxin) with insecticidal properties. The bacterium has been applied to crops as an insect-control strategy for many years, and this practice has been widely adopted in agriculture and gardening. Recently, plants have been developed that express a recombinant form of the bacterial protein, which may effectively control some insect predators. Environmental issues associated with the use of these transgenic crops have not been fully resolved.

== History ==
The idea of recombinant DNA was first proposed by Peter Lobban, a graduate student of Prof. Dale Kaiser in the Biochemistry Department at Stanford University Medical School. The first publications describing the successful production and intracellular replication of recombinant DNA appeared in 1972 and 1973, from Stanford and UCSF. In 1980 Paul Berg, a professor in the Biochemistry Department at Stanford and an author on one of the first papers was awarded the Nobel Prize in Chemistry for his work on nucleic acids "with particular regard to recombinant DNA". Werner Arber, Hamilton Smith, and Daniel Nathans shared the 1978 Nobel Prize in Physiology or Medicine for the discovery of restriction endonucleases which enhanced the techniques of rDNA technology.

Stanford University applied for a U.S. patent on recombinant DNA on November 4, 1974, listing the inventors as Herbert W. Boyer (professor at the University of California, San Francisco) and Stanley N. Cohen (professor at Stanford University); this patent, U.S. 4,237,224A, was awarded on December 2, 1980. The first licensed drug generated using recombinant DNA technology was human insulin, developed by Genentech and licensed by Eli Lilly and Company.

== Controversy ==
Scientists associated with the initial development of recombinant DNA methods recognized that the potential existed for organisms containing recombinant DNA to have undesirable or dangerous properties. At the 1975 Asilomar Conference on Recombinant DNA, these concerns were discussed and a voluntary moratorium on recombinant DNA research was initiated for experiments that were considered particularly risky. This moratorium was widely observed until the US National Institutes of Health developed and issued formal guidelines for rDNA work. Today, recombinant DNA molecules and recombinant proteins are usually not regarded as dangerous. However, concerns remain about some organisms that express recombinant DNA, particularly when they leave the laboratory and are introduced into the environment or food chain. These concerns are discussed in the articles on genetically modified organisms and genetically modified food controversies. Furthermore, there are concerns about the by-products in biopharmaceutical production, where recombinant DNA result in specific protein products. The major by-product, termed host cell protein, comes from the host expression system and poses a threat to the patient's health and the overall environment.

== See also ==
- Asilomar conference on recombinant DNA
- Genetic engineering
- Genetically modified organism
- Recombinant virus
- Vector DNA
- Biomolecular engineering
- Recombinant DNA technology
- Host cell protein
- T7 expression system
