= Let Them Eat Precaution =

2005 book by Jon Entine

Let Them Eat Precaution: How Politics is Undermining the Genetic Revolution in Agriculture
- Hardcover of Let Them Eat Precaution
- Editor: Jon Entine
- Subject: Scientific skepticism
- Publisher: AEI Press;
- Publication date: December 7, 2005
- Pages: 220
- ISBN: 978-0844742007

Let Them Eat Precaution: How Politics is Undermining the Genetic Revolution in Agriculture is a 2005 book edited by American author and journalist Jon Entine, about how politics is affecting the use of genetically modified food. The 10 contributing authors from the United States and the United Kingdom discuss the benefits of agricultural biotechnology, offer an international perspective on opposition it faces, and suggest potential solutions.

== Background ==
This book grew out of a 2003 conference, "Food Biotechnology, the Media, and Public Policy", held at the American Enterprise Institute. Jon Entine, the editor, is an adjunct fellow at the institute and a scholar in residence at Miami University in Ohio.

== Reception ==
According to Martin Marshall, Senior Associate Director ARP and Assistant Dean, Professor Agricultural Economics, Purdue University, "The book would be appropriate for a college-level course in science communication or in agricultural or science policy. Scientists involved in molecular biology and related research might find this book helps them better understand how something that they may think is a safe and exciting scientific discovery is not readily accepted by others in society."

== See also ==
- Chemophobia
- Genetic engineering
- Genetically modified crops
- Genetically modified food controversies
- Genetically modified organisms
- List of genetically modified crops
- Regulation of the release of genetic modified organisms
- Starlink corn recall
