= Julie E. Gray =

British plant molecular biologist

Julie Gray
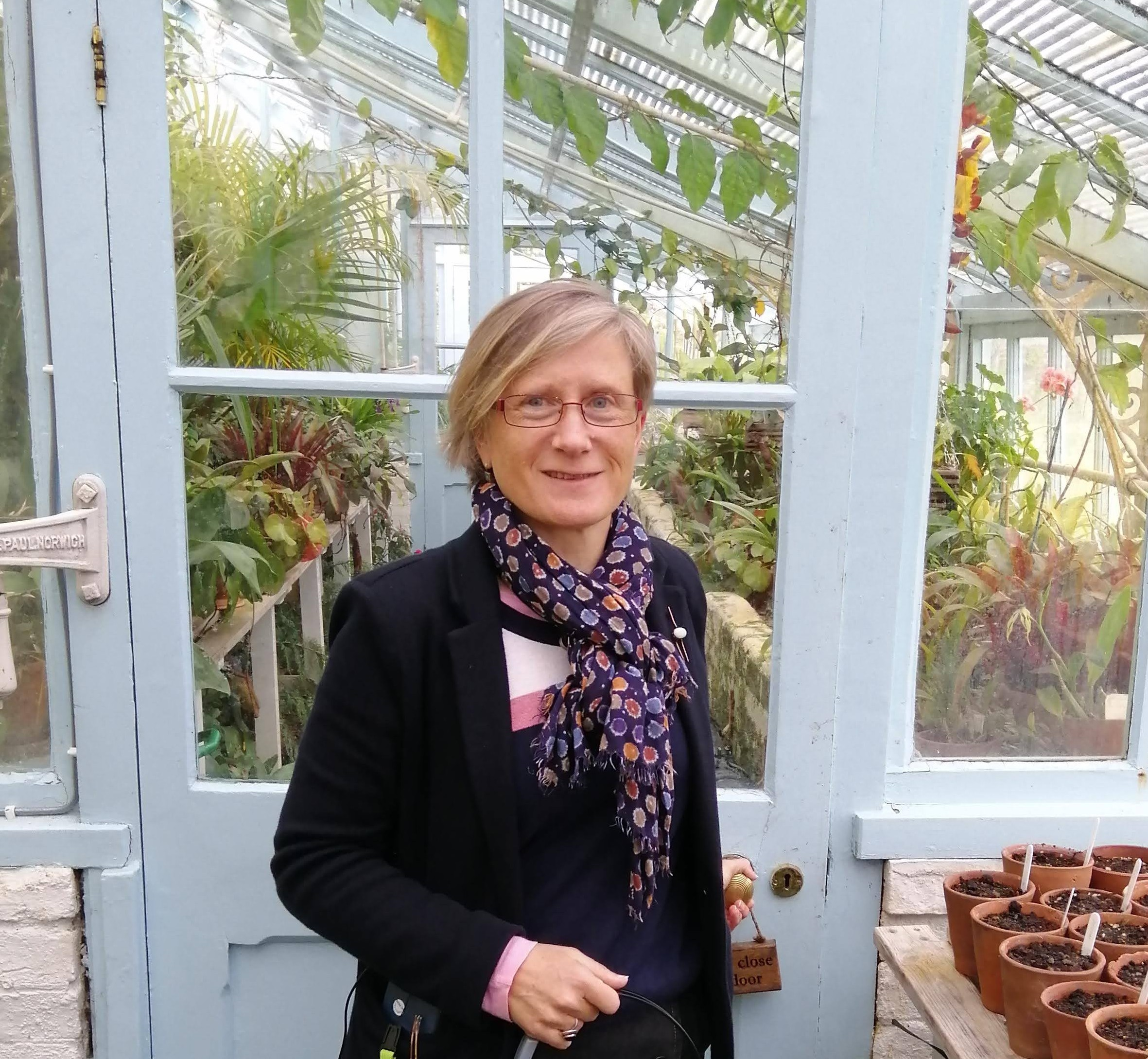
- Gray at Down House, May 2019
- Born: July 11 1962 (age 64); London, United Kingdom
- Education: University of Liverpool; University of Nottingham
- Spouse: David Gray
- Children: Two children
- Scientific career
- Fields: Molecular plant science
- Workplaces: University of Melbourne; University of Nottingham; University of Sheffield

Julie Elizabeth Gray (née Knapp; born 1962) is a British biologist and Professor of Plant Cell Signalling at the University of Sheffield. Her research examines how plants respond to environmental signals, particularly those controlling the closure and development of stomatal pores on leaf surfaces. She has applied these findings to develop crop plants with greater drought tolerance and water-use efficiency.

== Education ==
Gray attended schools in Worksop and Kidderminster and completed a BSc in Biochemistry at the University of Liverpool. She obtained a doctorate at the University of Nottingham Sutton Bonington Campus under the supervision of Don Grierson.

== Research and career ==
During her PhD and post-doctoral work Gray worked on fruit ripening in tomatoes and identified the first plant pectinesterase gene. The research group worked with Zeneca to produce genetically modified tomato products for sale in the UK – analogous to Flavr Savr in the US. Her PhD thesis was titled: Organisation and expression of ripening-related genes in normal and mutant tomatoes.

Gray subsequently took a research position at Macquarie University in Sydney, Australia. where she identified peach ripening genes.

In 1989 Gray was awarded a Royal Society Fellowship to work at the University of Melbourne, Australia with Adrienne Clarke in the Department of Botany where she studied self-incompatibility in flowering plants. Her worked showed that RNA degradation is involved in the rejection of self-pollen.

Gray returned to the University of Nottingham in October 1990 and resumed her work in identifying genes involved in tomato fruit ripening including a glutamate decarboxylase (GABA) gene which was subsequently used by others to create the first CRISPR-edited commercial food (Sicilian Rouge High GABA tomato).

Gray was appointed Lecturer in Biotechnology at the University of Sheffield in 1993. She was promoted to Professor in 2008.

Gray’s research into plant cell signalling at Sheffield has focused particularly on the regulation of gas exchange via the stomata of plant leaves. Her early worked looked at the molecular pathways that allow plant stomata to open and close in response to changes in light intensity, water and carbon dioxide availability. Her interests expanded to include research into the molecular pathways that regulate stomatal development and spacing and the evolution of stomatal regulators. Gray has gone on to demonstrate how the genes that regulate stomata impact crop water use and yields and her current focus is on identifying mechanisms to improve crop water use efficiency and resilience to changing climatic conditions through modifying stomatal characteristics. She is also researching the biochemical and biomechanical properties of the guard cell wall that aid stomatal movements.

In 2021, Gray was elected to the European Molecular Biology Organization.

== Recognition and appointments ==
Royal Society Research Fellowship (1989)

Visiting Professor at École Nationale Supérieure Agronomique (1991)

Visiting Professor at University of Sydney (2014)

Elected to the European Molecular Biology Organization. (2021)

Royal Society Leverhulme Senior Fellowship (2022)

Trustee-Director of Rothamsted Research Institute and Scientific Advisor to the Board. (2022 to present)

Visiting Professor Kasetsart University, Thailand (2024)

Editor, New Phytologist (2025 to present)

BBSRC Bioscience for Sustainable Agriculture and Food Strategy Advisory Panel (SAF SAP) member (2025 to present)
