= List of genetically modified crops =

Genetically modified crops are plants used in agriculture, the DNA of which has been modified using genetic engineering techniques. In most cases, the aim is to introduce a new trait to the plant which does not occur naturally in the species. As of 2015, 26 plant species had been genetically modified and approved for commercial release in at least one country. The majority of these species contained genes that made them either tolerant to herbicides or resistant to insects. Other common traits include virus resistance, delayed ripening, modified flower colour or altered composition. In 2014, 28 countries grew GM crops, and 39 countries imported but did not grow them.

== Background ==
Regulations regarding the commercialisation of genetically modified crops are mostly conducted by individual countries. For cultivation, environmental approval determines whether a crop can be legally grown. Separate approval is generally required to use GM crops in food for human consumption or as animal feed.

GM crops were first planted commercially on a large scale in 1996, in the US, China, Argentina, Canada, Australia, and Mexico. Some countries have approved but not actually cultivated GM crops, due to public uncertainty or further government restrictions, while at the same time, they may import GM foods for consumption. For example, Japan is a leading GM food importer, and permits but has not grown GM food crops. The European Union regulates import of GM foods, while individual member states determine cultivation. In the US, separate regulatory agencies handle approval for cultivation (USDA, EPA) and for human consumption (FDA).

Two genetically modified crops have been approved for food use in some countries, but have not obtained approval for cultivation. A GM Melon engineered for delayed senescence was approved in 1999 and a herbicide tolerant GM wheat was approved in 2004.

== Genetically modified crops cultivated in 2014 ==
Distribution of GM crops planted in 2014
1. GM soybean (50.0%)
2. GM maize (30.0%)
3. GM cotton (14.0%)
4. GM canola (5.00%)
5. Other (1.00%)

In 2014, 181.5 million hectares of genetically modified crops were planted in 28 countries. Half of all GM crops planted were genetically modified soybeans, either for herbicide tolerance or insect resistance. Eleven countries grew modified soybean, with the US, Brazil and Argentina accounting for 90% of the total hectarage. Of the 111 hectares of soybean grown worldwide in 2014, 82% was genetically modified in some way. Seventeen countries grew a total of 55.2 million hectares of genetically modified maize and fifteen grew 23.9 hectares of genetically modified cotton. Nine million hectares of genetically modified canola was grown with 8 million of those in Canada. Other GM crops grown in 2014 include alfalfa (862,000 ha), sugar beet (494,000 ha) and papaya (7,475 ha). In Bangladesh, a genetically modified eggplant was grown commercially for the first time on 12 ha.

The majority of GM crops have been modified to be resistant to selected herbicides, usually a glyphosate or glufosinate based one. In 2014, 154 million hectares were planted with a herbicide resistant crop and 78.8 million hectares had insect resistant. This include 51.4 million hectares planted in thirteen countries that contained both herbicide tolerance and insect resistance. Less than one million hectares contained other traits, which include providing virus resistance, delaying senescence, modifying flower colour and altering the plants composition. Drought tolerant maize was planted for just the second year in the USA on 275,000 hectares.

=== Herbicide tolerance ===
Genetically modified crops engineered to resist herbicides are now more available than conventionally bred resistant varieties. They comprised 83% of the total GM crop area, equating to just under 8% of the arable land worldwide. Approval has been granted to grow crops engineered to be resistant to the herbicides 2,4-dichlorophenoxyacetic acid, dicamba, glufosinate glyphosate, sulfonylurea, oxynil mesotrione and isoxaflutole Most herbicide resistant GM crops have been engineered for glyphosate tolerance, in the USA 93% of soybeans and most of the GM maize grown is glyphosate tolerant.

GMO	Use	Countries approved in	First approved	Notes
Alfalfa	Animal feed	USA	2005	Approval withdrawn in 2007 and then re-approved in 2011
Canola	Cooking oil Margarine Emulsifiers in packaged foods	Australia	2003	
Canola	Cooking oil Margarine Emulsifiers in packaged foods	Canada	1995	
Canola	Cooking oil Margarine Emulsifiers in packaged foods	USA	1995	
Cotton	Fiber; Cottonseed oil Animal feed Except in India, where Cottonseed oil used for human consumption	Argentina	2001	
Cotton	Fiber; Cottonseed oil Animal feed Except in India, where Cottonseed oil used for human consumption	Australia	2002	
Cotton	Fiber; Cottonseed oil Animal feed Except in India, where Cottonseed oil used for human consumption	Brazil	2008	
Cotton	Fiber; Cottonseed oil Animal feed Except in India, where Cottonseed oil used for human consumption	Colombia	2004	
Cotton	Fiber; Cottonseed oil Animal feed Except in India, where Cottonseed oil used for human consumption	Costa Rica	2008	
Cotton	Fiber; Cottonseed oil Animal feed Except in India, where Cottonseed oil used for human consumption	India	2002	
Cotton	Fiber; Cottonseed oil Animal feed Except in India, where Cottonseed oil used for human consumption	Mexico	2000	
Cotton	Fiber; Cottonseed oil Animal feed Except in India, where Cottonseed oil used for human consumption	Paraguay	2013	
Cotton	Fiber; Cottonseed oil Animal feed Except in India, where Cottonseed oil used for human consumption	South Africa	2000	
Cotton	Fiber; Cottonseed oil Animal feed Except in India, where Cottonseed oil used for human consumption	USA	1994	
Maize	Animal feed high-fructose corn syrup corn starch	Argentina	1998	
Maize	Animal feed high-fructose corn syrup corn starch	Brazil	2007	
Maize	Animal feed high-fructose corn syrup corn starch	Canada	1996	
Maize	Animal feed high-fructose corn syrup corn starch	Colombia	2007	
Maize	Animal feed high-fructose corn syrup corn starch	Cuba	2011	
Maize	Animal feed high-fructose corn syrup corn starch	European Union	1998	Grown in Portugal, Spain, Czech Republic, Slovakia and Romania
Maize	Animal feed high-fructose corn syrup corn starch	Honduras	2001	
Maize	Animal feed high-fructose corn syrup corn starch	Paraguay	2012	
Maize	Animal feed high-fructose corn syrup corn starch	Philippines	2002	
Maize	Animal feed high-fructose corn syrup corn starch	South Africa	2002	
Maize	Animal feed high-fructose corn syrup corn starch	USA	1995	
Maize	Animal feed high-fructose corn syrup corn starch	Uruguay	2003	
Soybean	Animal feed Soybean oil	Argentina	1996	
Soybean	Animal feed Soybean oil	Bolivia	2005	
Soybean	Animal feed Soybean oil	Brazil	1998	
Soybean	Animal feed Soybean oil	Canada	1995	
Soybean	Animal feed Soybean oil	Chile	2007	
Soybean	Animal feed Soybean oil	Costa Rica	2001	
Soybean	Animal feed Soybean oil	Mexico	1996	
Soybean	Animal feed Soybean oil	Paraguay	2004	
Soybean	Animal feed Soybean oil	South Africa	2001	
Soybean	Animal feed Soybean oil	USA	1993	
Soybean	Animal feed Soybean oil	Uruguay	1996	
Sugar Beet	Food	Canada	2001	
Sugar Beet	Food	USA	1998	Commercialised 2007, production blocked 2010, resumed 2011.

=== Insect resistance ===
Most currently available genes used to engineer insect resistance come from the Bacillus thuringiensis bacterium. Most are in the form of delta endotoxin genes known as cry proteins, while a few use the genes that encode for vegetative insecticidal proteins. Insect resistant crops target various species of coleopteran (beetles) and lepidopteran (moths). The only gene commercially used to provide insect protection that does not originate from B. thuringiensis is the Cowpea trypsin inhibitor (CpTI). CpTI was first approved for use in cotton in 1999 and is currently undergoing trials in rice.

GMO	Use	Countries approved in	First approved	Notes
Cotton	Fiber; Cottonseed oil Animal feed	Argentina	1998	
Cotton	Fiber; Cottonseed oil Animal feed	Australia	2003	
Cotton	Fiber; Cottonseed oil Animal feed	Brazil	2005	
Cotton	Fiber; Cottonseed oil Animal feed	Burkina Faso	2009	
Cotton	Fiber; Cottonseed oil Animal feed	China	1997	
Cotton	Fiber; Cottonseed oil Animal feed	Colombia	2003	
Cotton	Fiber; Cottonseed oil Animal feed	Costa Rica	2008	
Cotton	Fiber; Cottonseed oil Animal feed	India	2002	Largest producer of Bt cotton
Cotton	Fiber; Cottonseed oil Animal feed	Mexico	1996	
Cotton	Fiber; Cottonseed oil Animal feed	Myanmar	2006 (Note: No official public documentation available)	
Cotton	Fiber; Cottonseed oil Animal feed	Pakistan	2010	
Cotton	Fiber; Cottonseed oil Animal feed	Paraguay	2007	
Cotton	Fiber; Cottonseed oil Animal feed	South Africa	1997	
Cotton	Fiber; Cottonseed oil Animal feed	Sudan	2012	
Cotton	Fiber; Cottonseed oil Animal feed	USA	1995	
Eggplant	Food	Bangladesh	2013	12 ha planted on 120 farms in 2014
Maize	Animal feed high-fructose corn syrup corn starch	Argentina	1998	
Maize	Animal feed high-fructose corn syrup corn starch	Brazil	2005	
Maize	Animal feed high-fructose corn syrup corn starch	Columbia	2003	
Maize	Animal feed high-fructose corn syrup corn starch	Mexico	1996	Centre of origin for maize
Maize	Animal feed high-fructose corn syrup corn starch	Paraguay	2007	
Maize	Animal feed high-fructose corn syrup corn starch	Philippines	2002	
Maize	Animal feed high-fructose corn syrup corn starch	South Africa	1997	
Maize	Animal feed high-fructose corn syrup corn starch	Uruguay	2003	
Maize	Animal feed high-fructose corn syrup corn starch	USA	1995	
Poplar	Tree	China	1998	543 ha of bt poplar planted in 2014

=== Stacked traits ===
Many varieties of GM crops contain more than one resistance gene. This could be in the form of multiple insect resistant genes, multiple herbicide tolerance genes or a combination of the herbicide and insect resistant genes. Smartstax is a brand of GM maize that has eight different genes added to it, making it resistant to two types of herbicides and toxic to six different species of insects.

=== Other modified traits ===
While most crops are engineered to resist insects or tolerate herbicides some crops have been developed for other traits. Flowers have been engineered to display colours that they cannot do so naturally (in particular the blue color in roses). A few crops, like the genetically modified papaya, are engineered to resist viruses. Other modifications alter the plants composition, with the aim of making it more nutritious, longer lasting or more industrially useful. Recently, crops engineered to tolerate drought have been commercialised.

GMO	Use	Trait	Countries approved in	First approved	Notes
Canola	Cooking oil Margarine Emulsifiers in packaged foods	High laurate canola	Canada	1996	
Canola	Cooking oil Margarine Emulsifiers in packaged foods	High laurate canola	USA	1994	
Canola	Cooking oil Margarine Emulsifiers in packaged foods	Phytase production	USA	1998	
Carnation	Ornamental	Delayed senescence	Australia	1995	
Carnation	Ornamental	Delayed senescence	Norway	1998	
Carnation	Ornamental	Modified flower colour	Australia	1995	
Carnation	Ornamental	Modified flower colour	Colombia	2000	In 2014 4 ha were grown in greenhouses for export
Carnation	Ornamental	Modified flower colour	European Union	1998	Two events expired 2008, another approved 2007
Carnation	Ornamental	Modified flower colour	Japan	2004	
Carnation	Ornamental	Modified flower colour	Malaysia	2012	For ornamental purposes
Carnation	Ornamental	Modified flower colour	Norway	1997	
Maize	Animal feed high-fructose corn syrup corn starch	Increased lysine	Canada	2006	
Maize	Animal feed high-fructose corn syrup corn starch	Increased lysine	USA	2006	
Maize	Animal feed high-fructose corn syrup corn starch	Drought tolerance	Canada	2010	
Maize	Animal feed high-fructose corn syrup corn starch	Drought tolerance	USA	2011	
Papaya	Food	Virus resistance	China	2006	
Papaya	Food	Virus resistance	USA	1996	Mostly grown in Hawaii
Petunia	Ornamental	Modified flower colour		1998	
Potato	Food	Virus resistance	Canada	1999	
Potato	Food	Virus resistance	USA	1997	
Potato	Industrial	Modified starch	USA	2014	
Rose	Ornamental	Modified flower colour	Australia	2009	Surrendered renewal
Rose	Ornamental	Modified flower colour	Colombia	2010 (Note: No public documents)	Greenhouse cultivation for export only.
Rose	Ornamental	Modified flower colour	Japan	2008	
Rose	Ornamental	Modified flower colour	USA	2011	
Soybean	Animal feed Soybean oil	Increased oleic acid production	Argentina	2015	
Soybean	Animal feed Soybean oil	Increased oleic acid production	Canada	2000	
Soybean	Animal feed Soybean oil	Increased oleic acid production	USA	1997	
Soybean	Animal feed Soybean oil	Stearidonic acid production	Canada	2011	
Soybean	Animal feed Soybean oil	Stearidonic acid production	USA	2011	
Squash	Food	Virus resistance	USA	1994	
Sugar Cane	Food	Drought tolerance	Indonesia	2013	Environmental certificate only
Tobacco	Cigarettes	Nicotine reduction	USA	2002	

== Genetically modified crops that are no longer cultivated ==
GMO	Use	Trait	Countries approved in	First approved	Notes
Potato	Food	Insect resistance	Canada	1995	Withdrawn from market 2001
Potato	Food	Insect resistance	USA	1994	Withdrawn from market 2001
Potato	Industrial	Modified starch	European Union	2010	Development stopped 2012
Rice	Food	Insect resistance	Iran	2004	Grown on 4000 ha in 2005
Tobacco	Cigarettes	Herbicide resistance	China	1992	Not grown since 1995 due to strong opposition from tobacco importers.
Tomato	Food	Delayed softening	USA	1992	Production stopped 1997 First GM food (see Flavr Savr)

== Approved genetically modified crops that have not yet been cultivated ==
GMO	Use	Trait	Countries approved in	First approved	Notes
Apple	Food	Delayed browning	Canada	2015	
Apple	Food	Delayed browning	USA	2015	
Bean		Viral disease resistance	Brazil	2011	
Chicory	Animal feed	Herbicide tolerance	USA	1997	
Eucalyptus	Tree	Altered growth	Brazil	2015	
Flax	Linseed Oil	Herbicide tolerance	USA	1999	Canada gained approval in 1996, but it was rescinded in 2001
Grass	Ornamental Turfgrass	Herbicide tolerance	USA	2003	Rescinded approval in 2017 due to seed contamination in Oregon
Plum	Food	Virus resistance	USA	2007	
Potato	Food	Reduced acrylamide Blackspot bruise tolerance Late blight resistance	USA	2015	
Potato	Food	Virus resistance	Canada	1999	
Potato	Food	Virus resistance	USA	1997	
Potato	Industrial	Modified starch	USA	2014	
Sweet pepper	Food	Virus resistance	China	1998	

== Genetically modified crops by country ==
Country	GM food	Ha grown in 2014
Argentina	Cotton	530 000
Argentina	Maize	3 000 000
Argentina	Soybean	20 800 000
Australia	Canola	342 000
Australia	Carnation	
Australia	Cotton	200 000
Bangladesh	Eggplant	12
Brazil	Cotton	600 000
Brazil	Maize	12 500 000
Brazil	Soybean	29 100 000
Bolivia	Soybean	1 000 000
Burkina Faso	Cotton	454,124 (Note: GM cotton production was banned in 2016 due to economic and quality concerns.)
Canada	Canola	8 000 000
Canada	Maize	1 400 000
Canada	Soybean	2 200 000
Canada	Sugar beet	15 000
Chile	Canola	2 000
Chile	Maize	7 000
Chile	Soybean	1 000
China	Cotton	3 900 000
China	Papaya	8 475
China	Poplar	543
China	Sweet pepper	
China	Tomato	
Colombia	Cotton	18 000
Colombia	Maize	81 000
Costa Rica	Cotton	36.3
Costa Rica	Soybean	1.7
Cuba	Maize	3 000
Czech Republic	Maize	1,754
Honduras	Maize	29 000
India	Cotton	11 600 000
Mexico	Cotton	160 000
Mexico	Soybean	10 000
Myanmar	Cotton	318,000
Pakistan	Cotton	2 850 000
Paraguay	Cotton	36 000
Paraguay	Maize	500 000
Paraguay	Soybean	3 300 000
Philippines	Maize	831 000
Portugal	Maize	8 542
Romania	Maize	771
Slovakia	Maize	441
South Africa	Cotton	9 000
South Africa	Maize	2 150 000
South Africa	Soybean	552 000
Spain	Maize	131,538
Sudan	Cotton	90 000
United States of America	Alfalfa	862 000
United States of America	Canola	685 000
United States of America	Cotton	4 500 000
United States of America	Maize	34 500 000
United States of America	Papaya	1 000
United States of America	Potato	
United States of America	Soybean	32 300 000
United States of America	Squash	1 000
United States of America	Sugar beet	479 000
Uruguay	Maize	90 000
Uruguay	Soybean	1 550 000

=== See also ===
- AquAdvantage salmon
