= Chemical free =

Marketing term

Chemical free is a term used in marketing to imply that a product is safe, healthy or environmentally friendly because it only contains natural ingredients. The term is a misnomer, as all substances and objects are composed entirely of chemicals and energy and their origins play no role on whether something has toxic, hazardous, healthy or nutritious characteristics. The term chemical is roughly a synonym for matter, and all substances, such as water and air, are chemicals.

The use of the term chemical free in advertising to indicate that a product is free of synthetic chemicals, and the tolerance of its use in this fashion by the United Kingdom's Advertising Standards Authority, has been the subject of criticism.

A study on American undergraduates' understanding of the term chemical, conducted by chemist Gayle Nicoll in 1997, noted that "People may hold both a scientific and layman's definition of a chemical without linking the two together in any way. They may or may not consciously distinguish that the term 'chemical' has different connotations depending on the situation."

== See also ==
- Appeal to nature
- Chemophobia
