= Rhamnogalacturonan rhamnohydrolase =

Identifiers
- EC no.: 3.2.1.174

Databases
- IntEnz: IntEnz view
- BRENDA: BRENDA entry
- ExPASy: NiceZyme view
- KEGG: KEGG entry
- MetaCyc: metabolic pathway
- PRIAM: profile
- PDB structures: RCSB PDB PDBe PDBsum
Search
- PMC: articles
- PubMed: articles
- NCBI: proteins

Rhamnogalacturonan rhamnohydrolase (EC 3.2.1.174, RG-rhamnohydrolase, RG alpha-L-rhamnopyranohydrolase) is an enzyme with systematic name rhamnogalacturonan oligosaccharide alpha-L-Rha-(1->4)-alpha-D-GalA rhamnohydrolase. This enzyme catalyses the following chemical reaction

Exohydrolysis of the alpha-L-Rha-(1->4)-alpha-D-GalA bond in rhamnogalacturonan oligosaccharides with initial inversion of configuration releasing beta-L-rhamnose from the non-reducing end of rhamnogalacturonan oligosaccharides.

The enzyme is part of the degradation system for rhamnogalacturonan I in Aspergillus aculeatus.
