= Penicillium olsonii =

Scientific classification
- Kingdom: Fungi
- Division: Ascomycota
- Class: Eurotiomycetes
- Order: Eurotiales
- Family: Aspergillaceae
- Genus: Penicillium
- Species: P. olsonii

Binomial name
- Penicillium olsonii Bainier, G.; Sartory, A. 1912

Type strain
- CBS 232.60, CMI 192502, FRR 0432, IAM 13820, IBT 23473, IMI 192502, IMI 192505, JCM 22857, MUCL 38962, NRRL A-17120

Synonyms
- Penicillium volgaense

Species of fungus

Penicillium olsonii is an anamorph, filamentous species in the genus Penicillium which produces several polygalacturonases, xanthoepocin, asperphenamate, verrucolone, phthalate and olnacin. Penicillium olsonii is an often source of spoilage of tomatoes, salami and beans This species occurs ubiquitously in soil
