= Rhamnogalacturonan hydrolase =

Identifiers
- EC no.: 3.2.1.171

Databases
- IntEnz: IntEnz view
- BRENDA: BRENDA entry
- ExPASy: NiceZyme view
- KEGG: KEGG entry
- MetaCyc: metabolic pathway
- PRIAM: profile
- PDB structures: RCSB PDB PDBe PDBsum
Search
- PMC: articles
- PubMed: articles
- NCBI: proteins

Rhamnogalacturonan hydrolase (EC 3.2.1.171, rhamnogalacturonase A, RGase A, RG-hydrolase) is an enzyme with systematic name rhamnogalacturonan alpha-D-GalA-(1->2)-alpha-L-Rha hydrolase. This enzyme catalyses the following chemical reaction

Endohydrolysis of alpha-D-GalA-(1->2)-alpha-L-Rha glycosidic bond in the rhamnogalacturonan I backbone with initial inversion of anomeric configuration releasing oligosaccharides with beta-D-GalA at the reducing end.

The enzyme is part of the degradation system for rhamnogalacturonan I in Aspergillus aculeatus.
