= Rhamnogalacturonan galacturonohydrolase =

Identifiers
- EC no.: 3.2.1.173

Databases
- IntEnz: IntEnz view
- BRENDA: BRENDA entry
- ExPASy: NiceZyme view
- KEGG: KEGG entry
- MetaCyc: metabolic pathway
- PRIAM: profile
- PDB structures: RCSB PDB PDBe PDBsum
Search
- PMC: articles
- PubMed: articles
- NCBI: proteins

Rhamnogalacturonan galacturonohydrolase (EC 3.2.1.173, RG-galacturonohydrolase) is an enzyme with systematic name rhamnogalacturonan oligosaccharide alpha-D-GalA-(1->2)-alpha-L-Rha galacturonohydrolase. This enzyme catalyses the following chemical reaction

Exohydrolysis of the alpha-D-GalA-(1->2)-alpha-L-Rha bond in rhamnogalacturonan oligosaccharides with initial inversion of configuration releasing D-galacturonic acid from the non-reducing end of rhamnogalacturonan oligosaccharides.

The enzyme is part of the degradation system for rhamnogalacturonan I in Aspergillus aculeatus.
