= Appeal to nature =

Rhetorical tactic and potential fallacy

An appeal to nature is a rhetorical technique for presenting and proposing the argument that "a thing is good because it is 'natural', or bad because it is 'unnatural' or 'synthetic'." In debate and discussion, an appeal-to-nature argument can be considered to be a bad argument, because the implicit primary premise "What is natural is good" has no factual meaning beyond rhetoric in some or most contexts.

== Forms ==
The following is a construction of the appeal to nature argument:

That which is natural is good or right.
N is natural.
Therefore, N is good or right.

That which is unnatural is bad or wrong.
U is unnatural.
Therefore, U is bad or wrong.

In some contexts, the use of the terms of "nature" and "natural" can be vague, leading to unintended associations with other concepts. The word "natural" can also be a loaded term – much like the word "normal", in some contexts, it can carry an implicit value judgment. An appeal to nature would thus beg the question, because the conclusion is entailed by the premise.

Opinions differ regarding appeal to nature in rational argument. By some more permissive views, it can sometimes be taken as a helpful rule of thumb in certain limited domains, even if it admits some exceptions. When such a principle is applied as a rule of thumb, natural facts are presumed to provide reliable value judgments regarding what is good, barring evidence to the contrary, and likewise for unnatural facts providing reliable value judgments regarding what is bad. Within a limited domain, treating a rule of thumb such as "all else being equal, you should generally try to eat natural foods" as if it is an exceptionless principle can sometimes involve a fallacy of accident.

Julian Baggini explains the standard view of what makes this a fallacy as follows: "Even if we can agree that some things are natural and some are not, what follows from this? The answer is: nothing. There is no factual reason to suppose that what is natural is good (or at least better) and what is unnatural is bad (or at least worse)."

== History ==
The meaning and importance of various understandings and concepts of "nature" has been a persistent topic of discussion historically in both science and philosophy. In Ancient Greece, "the laws of nature were regarded not [simply] as generalized descriptions of what actually happens in the natural world ... but rather as norms that people ought to follow ... Thus the appeal to nature tended to mean an appeal to the nature of man treated as a source for norms of conduct. To Greeks this ... represented a conscious probing and exploration into an area wherein, according to their whole tradition of thought, lay the true source for norms of conduct."

In modern times, philosophers have challenged the notion that human beings' status as natural beings should determine or dictate their normative being. For example, Rousseau famously suggested that "We do not know what our nature permits us to be." More recently, Nikolas Kompridis has applied Rousseau's axiom to debates about genetic intervention (or other kinds of intervention) into the biological basis of human life, writing:

[T]here is a domain of human freedom not dictated by our biological nature, but [this] is somewhat unnerving because it leaves uncomfortably open what kind of beings human beings could become ... Put another way: What are we prepared to permit our nature to be? And on what basis should we give our permission?

Kompridis writes that the naturalistic view of living things, articulated by one scientist as that of "machines whose components are biochemicals" (Rodney Brooks), threatens to make a single normative understanding of human being the only possible understanding. He writes, "When we regard ourselves as 'machines whose components are biochemicals,' we not only presume to know what our nature permits us to be, but also that this knowledge permits us to answer the question of what is to become of us ... This is not a question we were meant to answer, but, rather, a question to which we must remain answerable."

== Examples ==
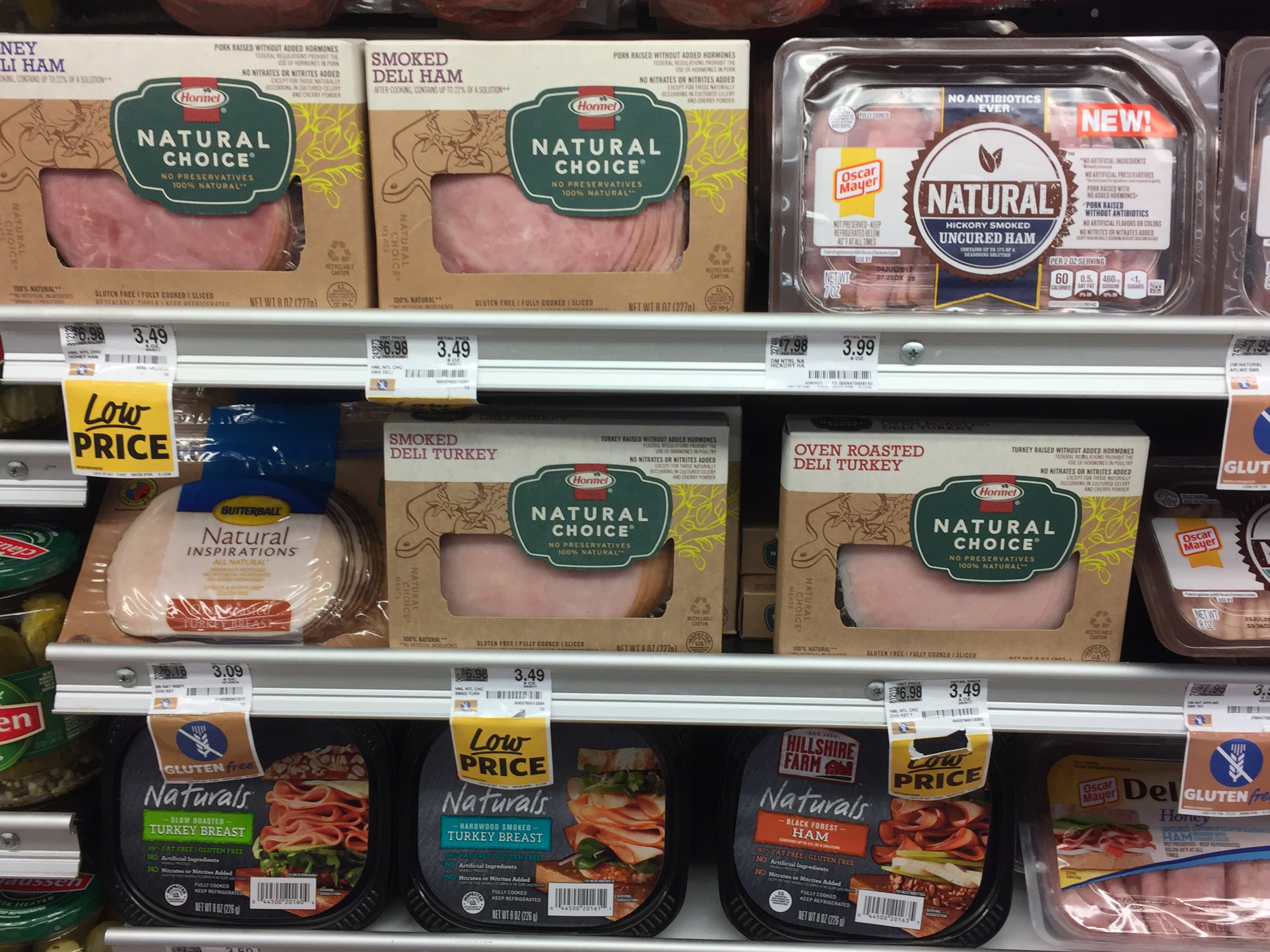
Supermarket shelf with four different brands advertising themselves, in some form, as "natural"

Some popular examples of the appeal to nature can be found on labels and advertisements for food, clothing, alternative herbal remedies, and many other areas. Labels may use the phrase "all-natural", to imply that products are environmentally friendly and safe. However, whether or not a product is "natural" is irrelevant, in itself, in determining its safety or effectiveness. For example, many dangerous poisons are compounds that are found in nature.

It is also common practice for medicine to be brought up as an appeal to nature, stating that medicine is "unnatural" and therefore should not be used. This is particularly notable as an argument employed against the practice of vaccination.

On the topic of meat consumption, philosopher Peter Singer argues that it is fallacious to say that eating meat is morally acceptable simply because it is part of the "natural way", as the way that humans and other animals do behave naturally has no bearing on how we should behave. Thus, Singer claims, the moral permissibility or impermissibility of eating meat must be assessed on its own merits, not by appealing to what is "natural".

The appeal to nature is frequently utilized in commercial advertising because it successfully leverages a deep-seated cognitive heuristic known as the "naturalness bias." This bias causes consumers to quickly and automatically associate the term "natural" with positive attributes such as health, purity, and moral goodness, often overriding the need for scientific evidence. In consumer psychology, research demonstrates the tangible effects of this fallacy on purchasing behavior. For instance, a study by Pornpitakpan (2004) found that framing food or cosmetic products as "natural" not only significantly increased purchase intent but also resulted in a more favorable overall attitude towards the brand. This persuasive power stems from a quick, System 1 thinking process, in which people substitute the problematic question "Is this product scientifically safe and effective?" with the more straightforward, more emotionally resonant question "Does this sound natural?" Thus, the use of this fallacy in marketing effectively bypasses critical evaluation by appealing directly to the consumer's preconceived, positive halo effect surrounding the concept of nature.

== See also ==
- Antinaturalism (politics)
- Anti-vaccine activism
- Carnism
- Chemophobia
- Confirmation bias
- Ethical naturalism
- Gender roles
- Greenwashing
- Green marketing
- Homophobia
- Human nature
- Natural law
- Neurodiversity
- Noble savage
- Norm (philosophy)
- Predation problem
- Problem of evil
- Scientism
- Technophobia
- Transhumanism
- Vitalism
- Vis medicatrix naturae
- Wild animal suffering
