= Chemophobia =

Fear of chemicals

Chemophobia (or chemphobia or chemonoia) is an aversion to or prejudice against chemicals or chemistry. The phenomenon has been ascribed both to a reasonable concern over the potential adverse effects of synthetic chemicals, and to an irrational fear of these substances because of misconceptions about their potential for harm, particularly the possibility of certain exposures to some synthetic chemicals elevating an individual's risk of cancer. Consumer products with labels such as "natural" and "chemical free" (the latter being impossible if taken literally, since all consumer products consist of chemical substances) appeal to chemophobic sentiments by offering consumers what appears to be a safer alternative (see appeal to nature).

Chemists note that the distinction of "natural" vs "artificial" is incorrect since all things in the universe are chemical by default and their origins play no role on any toxic, hazardous, healthy, or nutritious characteristic. Chemist's state that the more knowledge on chemicals an individual gains, the less chemophobic they will be.

== Definition and uses ==
There are differing opinions on the proper usage of the word chemophobia. The International Union of Pure and Applied Chemistry (IUPAC) defines chemophobia as an "irrational fear of chemicals". According to the American Council on Science and Health, chemophobia is a fear of synthetic substances arising from "scare stories" and exaggerated claims about their dangers prevalent in the media.

Despite containing the suffix -phobia, the majority of written work focusing on addressing chemophobia describes it as a non-clinical aversion or prejudice, and not as a phobia in the standard medical definition. Chemophobia is generally addressed by chemical education and public outreach despite the fact that much of chemophobia is economic or political in nature.

Michelle Francl has written: "We are a chemophobic culture. Chemical has become a synonym for something artificial, adulterated, hazardous, or toxic." She characterizes chemophobia as "more like color blindness than a true phobia" because chemophobics are "blind" to most of the chemicals that they encounter; every substance in the universe is a chemical. Francl proposes that such misconceptions are not innocuous, as demonstrated in one case by local statutes opposing the fluoridation of public water despite documented cases of tooth loss and nutritional deficit. In terms of risk perception, naturally occurring chemicals feel safer than synthetic ones to most people because of the involvement of humans. Consequently, people fear man-made or "unnatural" chemicals, while accepting natural chemicals that are known to be dangerous or poisonous.

The Carcinogenic Potency Project, which is a part of the US EPA's Distributed Structure-Searchable Toxicity (DSSTox) Database Network, has been systemically testing the carcinogenicity of chemicals, both natural and synthetic, and building a publicly available database of the results since the 1980s. Their work attempts to fill in the gaps in our scientific knowledge of the carcinogenicity of all chemicals, both natural and synthetic, as the scientists conducting the Project described in the journal, Science, in 1992:

Toxicological examination of synthetic chemicals, without similar examination of chemicals that occur naturally, has resulted in an imbalance in both the data on and the perception of chemical carcinogens. Three points that we have discussed indicate that comparisons should be made with natural as well as synthetic chemicals.

1. The vast proportion of chemicals that humans are exposed to occur naturally. Nevertheless, the public tends to view chemicals as only synthetic and to think of synthetic chemicals as toxic despite the fact that every natural chemical is also toxic at some dose. The daily average exposure of Americans to burnt material in the diet is ~2000 mg, and exposure to natural pesticides (the chemicals that plants produce to defend themselves) is ~1500 mg. In comparison, the total daily exposure to all synthetic pesticide residues combined is ~0.09 mg. Thus, we estimate that 99.99% of the pesticides humans ingest are natural. Despite this enormously greater exposure to natural chemicals, 79% (378 out of 479) of the chemicals tested for carcinogenicity in both rats and mice are synthetic (that is, do not occur naturally).
2. It has often been wrongly assumed that humans have evolved defenses against the natural chemicals in our diet but not against the synthetic chemicals. However, defenses that animals have evolved are mostly general rather than specific for particular chemicals; moreover, defenses are generally inducible and therefore protect well from low doses of both synthetic and natural chemicals.
3. Because the toxicology of natural and synthetic chemicals is similar, one expects (and finds) a similar positivity rate for carcinogenicity among synthetic and natural chemicals. The positivity rate among chemicals tested in rats and mice is ~50%. Therefore, because humans are exposed to so many more natural than synthetic chemicals (by weight and by number), humans are exposed to an enormous background of rodent carcinogens, as defined by high-dose tests on rodents. We have shown that even though only a tiny proportion of natural pesticides in plant foods have been tested, the 29 that are rodent carcinogens among the 57 tested, occur in more than 50 common plant foods. It is probable that almost every fruit and vegetable in the supermarket contains natural pesticides that are rodent carcinogens.

== Causes and effects ==
According to chemistry professor Pierre Laszlo, chemists have experienced chemophobia from the population at large, and asserts that it is rooted both in irrational notions and in genuine concerns (such as those over chemical warfare and industrial disasters). Gordon Gribble has written that the start of chemophobia could arguably be attributed to Silent Spring (1962), and that subsequent events such as the contamination of Times Beach (1983) and the Bhopal disaster (1984) only exacerbated the situation.

These events have led to association between the word "chemical" and notions of things that unnatural or artificial and also dangerous, and the opposite has occurred, where goods are marketed as "chemical free" or "natural", to avoid this association, which in turn reinforces the misconception that "chemicals" are unnatural and dangerous. The chemical industry has moved to make chemicals used as flavoring or aromas using biotechnology instead of synthetic chemistry, as the products can be marketed as "natural".

According to the industry advocacy group American Council on Science and Health, chemophobia is a growing phenomenon among the American public and has reached "epidemic" proportions among the general public. In a book published by the Council, Jon Entine writes that this is in part due to the propensity of people to show alarm at the reported presence of chemicals in their body, or in the environment, even when the chemicals are present in "minuscule amounts" which are in fact safe. Elsewhere, Entine has argued that chemophobia is linked to a precautionary principle in agricultural policy, which could jeopardize the world's ability to feed its ever-expanding population.

In the United Kingdom, Sense about Science produced a leaflet aimed at educating celebrities about science, in which it said that humans carry only small amounts of "chemical baggage" and that it is only because of advances in analytical chemistry that we can detect these traces at all.

Philip Abelson argued that the practice of administering huge doses of substances to animals in laboratory experiments, when testing for carcinogenic potential, led to public chemophobia, raising unjustified fears over those substances' effect on humans. He saw an opportunity cost in the "phantom hazards" such testing conjures, as it distracted from attention on known hazards posed to human health.

Michael Siegrist and Angela Bearth conducted a survey on eight European countries – Austria, France, Germany, Italy, Poland, Sweden, Switzerland and United Kingdom – with a sample of 5,631 participants to measure chemophobia. Results found that 30% of participants were "scared" of chemical substances. Additionally, 40% of participants believed that they "avoid chemical substances in [their] daily lives" and 39% of participants wanted to live in a world that was "chemical free".

== See also ==
- Appeal to nature
- Hazardous chemicals
  - Persistent organic pollutants
- Organic food
- Natural food
- Dihydrogen monoxide parody
- Genetically modified food controversies
- Multiple chemical sensitivity
- List of phobias
- Non-medical use of the suffix -phobia
- Vaccine hesitancy
- Water fluoridation
- Let Them Eat Precaution
