= Polygalacturonase inhibitor =

Part of enzyme inhibition

Polygalacturonase inhibitor proteins (PGIPs), also known as polygalacturonase-inhibiting proteins, are plant proteins capable of inhibiting the action of polygalacturonase (PG) enzymes produced by bacterial and fungal pathogens. PGs can be produced by pathogens to degrade the polygalacturonan component of plant cell walls. PGIPs are leucine-rich repeat glycoproteins of approximately 360 amino acids in length, and PGIPs may reduce the activity of PGs by one or two orders of magnitude. Both competitive and non-competitive inhibition has been observed for various PGIPs. However, no inhibition of endogenous plant PGs that participate in fruit ripening by PGIPs have been reported.

Small oligosaccharides produced from PG activity act as signals for the production of PGIPs within the plant. Despite the fact that most plant PGIPs have similar amino acids sequences, there exists a great deal of specificity between different plant and pathogen pairings. The specificity of the PGIPs for certain pathogenic PGs may significantly contribute to different crops being susceptible or resistant to different bacterial and fungal infections.

== Structure ==
At present only one plant PGIP structure has been experimentally determined. A non-glycosylated version of PGIP-2 from Phaseolus vulgaris (bean) was successfully crystallized and analyzed by X-ray diffraction in 2003. Computational modeling has been used since that time to generate theoretical three-dimensional structures for many commonly researched plants and crops using the bean PGIP-2 structure as a template. Additional research has been done to characterize the glycosylations of various PGIPs, and these have been included in the computational models.
