= Genetically modified tomato =

Tomato with modified genes

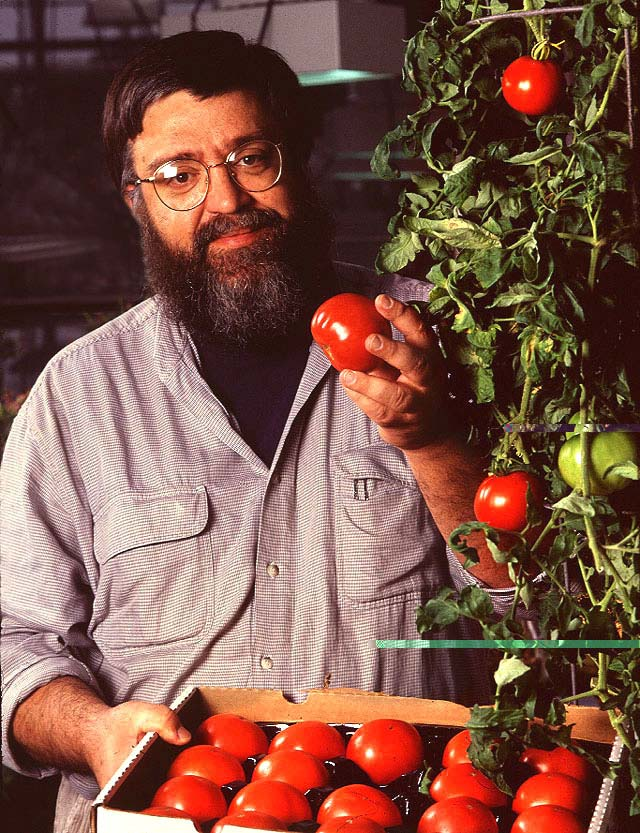
Plant physiologist Athanasios Theologis with tomatoes that contain the bioengineered ACC synthase gene

A genetically modified tomato, or transgenic tomato, is a tomato that has had its genes modified, using genetic engineering. The first trial genetically modified food was a tomato engineered to have a longer shelf life (the Flavr Savr), which was on the market briefly beginning on May 21, 1994, in the USA. The first direct-consumption tomato was approved in Japan in 2021. Primary work is focused on developing tomatoes with new traits, such as increased resistance to pests or environmental stresses. Other projects aim to enrich tomatoes with substances that may offer health benefits or be more nutritious. As well as aiming to produce novel crops, scientists produce genetically modified tomatoes to understand the function of genes naturally present in tomatoes.

Agrobacterium-mediated genetic engineering techniques were developed in the late 1980s that could successfully transfer genetic material into the nuclear genome of tomatoes. Genetic material can also be inserted into a tomato cell's chloroplast and chromoplast plastomes using biolistics. Tomatoes were the first food crop with an edible fruit where this was possible.

== Examples ==
=== Delayed ripening ===
Tomatoes have been used as a model organism to study the fruit ripening of climacteric fruit. To understand the mechanisms involved in the process of ripening, scientists have genetically engineered tomatoes.

In 1994, the Flavr Savr became the first commercially grown, genetically engineered food to be granted a license for human consumption. A second copy of the tomato gene for polygalacturonase (PG) was inserted into the tomato genome in the antisense direction. The polygalacturonase enzyme degrades pectin, a component of the tomato cell wall, causing the fruit to soften. When the antisense gene is expressed, it interferes with the production of the polygalacturonase enzyme, delaying the ripening process. The Flavr Savr failed to achieve commercial success due to high production costs, attributed to the use of an old low-yielding variety as the parent. It was withdrawn from the market in 1997. Together with Don Grierson, Julie Gray and others at the University of Nottingham, Zeneca used a similar technology on a commercially successful variety called T7, adding a truncated version of the PG gene. It was used to make a tomato paste with much commercial success, before changing public perception of GMO reduced sales.

DNA Plant Technology (DNAP), Agritope, and Monsanto developed tomatoes that delayed ripening by preventing the production of ethylene, a hormone that triggers ripening of fruit. All three tomatoes inhibited ethylene production by reducing the amount of 1-aminocyclopropane-1-carboxylic acid (ACC), the precursor to ethylene. DNAP's tomato, called Endless Summer, inserted a truncated version of the ACC synthase gene into the tomato that interfered with the endogenous ACC synthase. Monsanto's tomato was engineered with the ACC deaminase gene from the soil bacterium Pseudomonas chlororaphis that lowered ethylene levels by breaking down ACC. Agritope introduced an S-adenosylmethionine hydrolase (SAMase) encoding gene derived from the E. coli bacteriophage T3, which reduced the levels of S-adenosylmethionine, a precursor to ACC. Endless Summer was briefly tested in the marketplace, but patent arguments forced its withdrawal.

Scientists in India have delayed the ripening of tomatoes by silencing two genes encoding N-glycoprotein-modifying enzymes, α-mannosidase and β-D-N-acetylhexosaminidase. The fruits produced were not visibly damaged after being stored at room temperature for 45 days, whereas unmodified tomatoes had gone rotten. In India, where 30% of fruit is wasted before it reaches the market due to a lack of refrigeration and poor road infrastructure, the researchers hope genetic engineering of the tomato would decrease wastage.

=== Environmental stress tolerance ===
Abiotic stresses such as frost, drought, and high soil salinity are limiting factors to the growth of tomatoes. While no genetically modified stress-tolerant plants are currently commercialised, transgenic approaches have been researched. An early tomato was developed that contained an antifreeze gene (afa3) from the winter flounder with the aim of increasing the tomato's tolerance to frost, which became an icon in the early years of the debate over genetically modified foods, especially in relation to the perceived ethical dilemma of combining genes from different species. This tomato gained the moniker "fish tomato". The antifreeze protein was found to inhibit ice recrystallization in the flounder blood, but had no effect when expressed in transgenic tobacco. The resulting tomato was never commercialized, possibly because the transgenic plant did not perform well in its frost-tolerance or other agronomic characteristics. Another failed cold tolerant is the E. coli GR transgenic: Others had successfully produced cold tolerant Nicotiana tabacum by inserting various enzymes into the plastids that had already been observed to be more active under cold stress in the donor organism. Brüggemann et al. 1999 thus assumed the same would hold for a transfer of E. coli's glutathione reductase → the chloroplasts of S. lycopersicum and S. peruvianum. They overexpressed the donated GR – and this was supplementing the endogenous GR. Although total GR activity was increased, no improvement in cold tolerance occurred.

Other genes from various species have been inserted into the tomato with the hope of increasing their resistance to various environmental factors. A gene from rice (Osmyb4), which codes for a transcription factor, that was shown to increase cold and drought tolerance in transgenic Arabidopsis thaliana plants, was inserted into the tomato. This resulted in increased drought tolerance, but did not appear to have any effect on cold tolerance. Overexpressing a vacuolar Na^{+}/H^{+} antiport (AtNHX1) from A. thaliana lead to salt accumulation in the leaves of the plants, but not in the fruit and allowed them to grow more in salt solutions than wildtype plants. Tobacco osmotic genes overexpressed in tomatoes produced plants that held a higher water content than wildtype plants, increasing tolerance to drought and salt stress.

=== Pest resistance ===
The insecticidal toxin from the bacterium Bacillus thuringiensis has been inserted into a tomato plant. When field tested, they showed resistance to the tobacco hornworm (Manduca sexta), tomato fruitworm (Heliothis zea), the tomato pinworm (Keiferia lycopersicella), and the tomato fruit borer (Helicoverpa armigera). A 91-day feeding trial in rats showed no adverse effects, but the Bt tomato has never been commercialised. Tomatoes resistant to a root-knot nematode have been created by inserting a cysteine proteinase inhibitor gene from taro. A chemically synthesised cecropin B gene, usually found in the giant silk moth (Hyalophora cecropia), has been introduced into tomato plants and in vivo studies show significant resistance to bacterial wilt and bacterial spot. When the cell wall proteins, polygalacturonase and expansin are prevented from being produced in fruits, they are less susceptible to the fungus Botrytis cinerea than normal tomatoes. Pest-resistant tomatoes can reduce the ecological footprint of tomato production, while at the same time increase farm income.

=== Improved nutrition ===
Tomatoes have been altered in attempts to add nutritional content. In 2000, the concentration of pro-vitamin A was increased by adding a bacterial gene encoding phytoene desaturase, although the total amount of carotenoids remained equal. The researchers admitted at the time that it had no prospect of being grown commercially due to the anti-GM climate. Sue Meyer of the pressure group Genewatch, told The Independent that she believed, "If you change the basic biochemistry, you could alter the levels of other nutrients very important for health". More recently, scientists created blue tomatoes that have increased the production of anthocyanin, an antioxidant in tomatoes, in several ways. One group added a transcription factor for the production of anthocyanin from Arabidopsis thaliana whereas another used transcription factors from snapdragon (Antirrhinum). When the snapdragon genes were used, the fruits had similar anthocyanin concentrations to blackberries and blueberries. The inventors of the GMO blue tomato using snapdragon genes, Jonathan Jones and Cathie Martin of the John Innes Centre, founded a company called Norfolk Plant Sciences to commercialize the blue tomato. They partnered with a company in Canada called New Energy Farms to grow a large crop of blue tomatoes, from which to create juice to test in clinical trials on the way to obtaining regulatory approval.

Another group has tried to increase the levels of isoflavone, known for its potential cancer-preventive properties, by introducing soybean isoflavone synthase into tomatoes.

In 2021, Japanese Sanatech Seed issued Sicilian Rouge High GABA tomato variety with increased gamma-aminobutyric acid levels. This was achieved by increasing the activity of the tomato's glutamic acid decarboxylase, which they did by disabling the gene that encodes calmodulin-binding domain (CaMBD), since removal of CaMBD increased activity of the enzyme.

=== Improved taste ===
When geraniol synthase from lemon basil (Ocimum basilicum) was expressed in tomato fruits under a fruit-specific promoter, 60% of untrained taste testers preferred the taste and smell of the transgenic tomatoes. The fruits contained around half the amount of lycopene.

=== Vaccines ===
Tomatoes (along with potatoes, bananas, and other plants) are being investigated as vehicles for delivering edible vaccines. Clinical trials have been conducted on mice using tomatoes expressing antibodies or proteins that stimulate antibody production targeted to norovirus, hepatitis B, rabies, HIV, and respiratory syncytial viruses and anthrax bacteria . Korean scientists are looking at using the tomato to express a vaccine against Alzheimer's disease. Hilary Koprowski, who was involved in the development of the polio vaccine, led a group of researchers in developing a tomato expressing a recombinant vaccine to SARS.

=== Basic research ===
Tomatoes are used as a model organism in scientific research and are frequently genetically modified to further understanding of particular processes. They have been used as a model in map-based cloning, where transgenic plants must be created to prove that a gene has been successfully isolated. A plant peptide hormone, systemin, was first identified in tomato plants and genetic modification has been used to demonstrate its function, by adding antisense genes to silence the native gene or by adding extra copies of the native gene.
