= Flavr Savr =

Genetically engineered food

Flavr Savr (also known as CGN-89564-2; pronounced "flavor saver"), is a genetically modified tomato that was the first commercially grown genetically engineered food to be granted a license for human consumption. It was developed by the Californian company Calgene in the 1980s. The tomato has an improved shelf-life, increased fungal resistance, and a slightly increased viscosity compared to its unmodified counterpart. It was meant to be harvested ripe for increased flavor for long-distance shipping. The Flavr Savr contains two genes added by Calgene; a reversed antisense polygalacturonase gene, which inhibits the production of a rotting enzyme, and a gene responsible for the creation of APH(3')II, which confers resistance to certain aminoglycoside antibiotics, including kanamycin and neomycin.

On May 18, 1994, the FDA completed its evaluation of the Flavr Savr tomato and the use of APH(3')II, concluding that the tomato "is as safe as tomatoes bred by conventional means" and "that the use of aminoglycoside 3'-phosphotransferase II is safe for use as a processing aid in the development of new varieties of tomato, rapeseed oil, and cotton intended for food use." It was first sold in 1994, and was only available before production ceased in 1997. Calgene made history, but mounting costs prevented the company from becoming profitable, and it was eventually acquired by Monsanto Company.

== Characteristics ==
=== Genetic modification ===
Tomatoes have a short shelf-life in which they remain firm and ripe. This lifetime may be shorter than the time needed for them to reach market when shipped from winter growing areas to markets in the north, and the softening process can also lead to more of the fruit being damaged during transit. If picked while ripe, tomatoes can spoil before reaching far-away consumers due to their short lifetime. To address this, tomatoes intended for shipping are often picked while they are unripe, or "green", and then prompted to ripen just before delivery through the use of ethylene gas, which acts as a plant hormone. The downside to this approach is that the tomato does not complete its natural growing process, and the final flavor suffers as a result.

Through genetic engineering, Calgene hoped to slow down the ripening process of the tomato, thus preventing it from softening too early, while still allowing the tomato to retain its natural color and flavor. This would allow it to fully ripen on the vine and still be shipped long distances without it going soft. Calgene scientists used the modified bacterial parasite Agrobacterium tumefaciens to transfer genetic material into Flavr Savr plant cells. The bacterium normally "infects" plants with the bacteria's own (foreign) genes as a part of its lifecycle. The harmful, parasitic genetic material was removed from the bacterial T-plasmid and was replaced by the favored genes.

The Flavr Savr was made more resistant to rotting by the addition of an antisense gene which interferes with the production of the enzyme beta polygalacturonase (PG). The enzyme normally contributes to spoilage by degrading pectin in cell walls and results in the softening of fruit, which makes them more susceptible to being damaged by fungal infections and physical actions. Flavr Savr turned out to disappoint researchers in that respect, as the antisense version of the PG gene had a positive effect on shelf life, but not on the fruit's firmness. The Flavr Savr was too soft to be reliably machine-picked and transported when harvested while ripe, so the tomatoes still had to be harvested like any other unmodified vine-ripe tomato.

The Flavr Savr also contained a kanamycin-resistance gene called APH(3')II. This gene gave bacterial cells and chloroplasts resistance to multiple antibiotics, including kanamycin. The kanamycin-resistance gene was used during the tomato's creation phase to help scientists identify plants with the genes successfully added. Kanamycin is toxic to chloroplasts and is deadly for some plants. When researchers exposed tomato plants to high levels of kanamycin, only plants with the added genes survived.

=== Parent variety ===
The Flavor Savr was based on an old, low-yielding parent variety ("germplasm") because Calgene wanted to avoid infringing on the intellectual property of newer, better, conventionally-bred varieties. As the plant is genetically identical to the parent variety for all but the modified parts, it inherited the failings of its parent, yielding only 25-50% as many boxes per acre compared to most grower; to make matters worse, only half of these tomatoes were large enough to be sold at a premium price. Combined with the failure to make the tomato machine pickable, it ended up costing $10 per pound to produce Flavr Savr, but they were being sold for only $1.99 per pound at the market.

An improved flavor, later achieved through traditional breeding of Flavr Savr and better-tasting varieties, would contribute to selling Flavr Savr at a premium price at the supermarket.

== Controversy ==
The FDA stated that special labeling for these modified tomatoes was not necessary because they have the essential characteristics of unmodified tomatoes. Specifically, no evidence for health risks was found, and the nutritional content was unchanged. According to the existing policy at the time, genetically modified products were only required to be labeled if a significant alteration was made. Most GMOs were not subjected to mandatory labeling, which allowed for the vast majority of commercially sold, genetically modified foods to remain unlabeled.

Flavr Savr tomatoes were still labeled as genetically altered, though it was not a requirement. The FDA's no-label policy was criticized because people believed that consumers deserved the right to know what was in their food. Safety concerns were also cited. Thousands of comments were sent to the FDA asking for a change to the labeling guidelines. However, the FDA still did not implement mandatory labeling of foods derived from biotechnology until January 2022.

Some did not trust the tomato's safety. Because some members of the public were misinformed on genetic technology, people feared the Flavr Savr and other genetically modified products to be potentially hazardous to human health or the environment. Some chefs and food distributors boycotted the Flavr Savr and refused to sell the tomatoes in their stores. Jeremy Rifkin, an antibiotechnology activist, said, "It may be benign, but [the Flavr Savr] may turn out to be toxic." He founded the Pure Food Campaign, which opposed the introduction of genetically modified foods into consumer markets.

== Acquisition by Monsanto ==
Because of high research and production costs and low profits, Calgene was sold to Monsanto in 1997 for more than $200 million. Monsanto acquired all of Calgene's products, including the Flavr Savr. The company was more interested in Calgene's patents to certain key technologies, and the Flavr Savr has since been shelved and is currently out of production.

The failure of the Flavr Savr has been attributed to Calgene's inexperience in the business of growing and shipping tomatoes.

== Similar modifications ==
=== Tomato paste ===
In the UK, Zeneca produced a tomato paste that used technology similar to the Flavr Savr. Starting with a successful processing (i.e. bred for machine-picking) variety called T7, Zeneca added a truncated PG gene (either sense or antisense worked to reduce PG levels) and an APH(3')II gene to the plant. They successfully made the resulting tomato firmer than its parent. Due to the characteristics of the tomato, the tomato paste was cheaper to produce than conventional tomato paste, resulting in the product being 20% cheaper. Between 1996 and 1999, 1.8 million cans, clearly labelled as genetically engineered, were sold in the major supermarket chains Sainsbury's and Safeway UK. At one point, the paste outsold normal tomato paste, but sales fell in the autumn of 1998.

The House of Commons of the United Kingdom published a report in which they stated that the decline in sales during this period was linked to changing consumer perceptions of genetically modified crops. The report identified several possible factors, including product labeling and perception of choice, lobbying campaigns, and media attention. It concluded that the tone of media reports on the subject underwent a "fundamental shift" in response to a high-profile incident in which Dr. Arpad Pusztai, a researcher for Rowett Research Institute, was fired after making a televised claim about detrimental health effects in laboratory rats fed a diet of genetically modified potatoes (see the Pusztai affair). Subsequent peer review and testimony by Dr. Pusztai led the House Science and Technology Select Committee to conclude that his initial claim was "contradicted by his own evidence." In the intervening period, Sainsbury's and Safeway both pledged that none of their house-brand products would contain genetically modified ingredients.

Don Grierson was involved in the research to make the genetically modified tomato.
