= Jon Entine =

American science writer and consultant (born 1952)

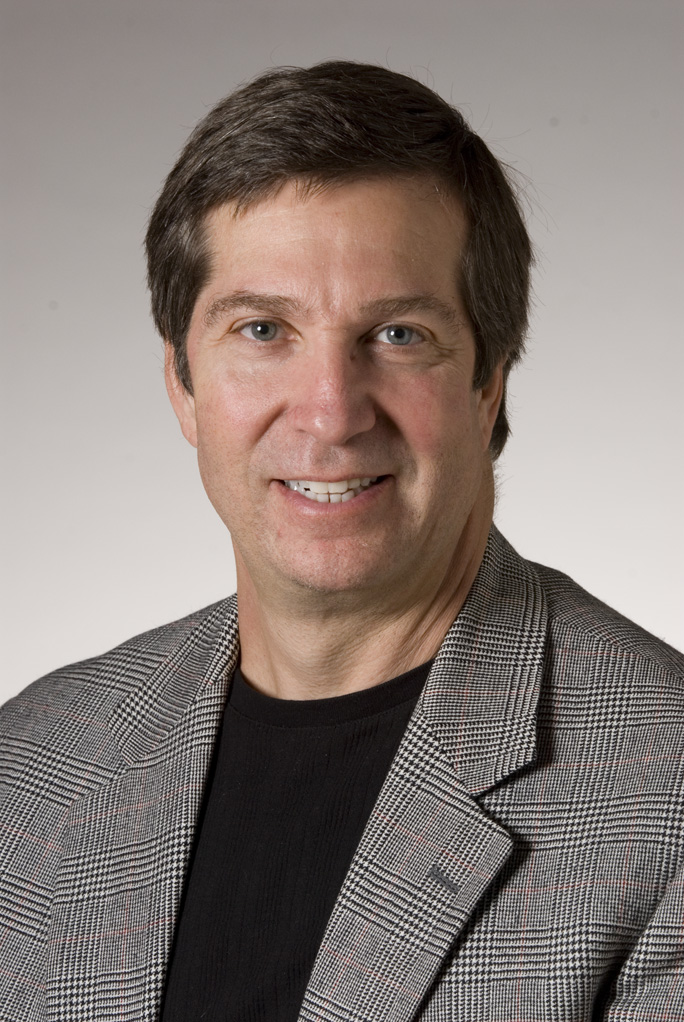
- Entine in 2008
- Born: April 30, 1952 (age 73); Philadelphia, Pennsylvania, U.S.
- Occupation(s): Science journalist, consultant

Jon Entine (born April 30, 1952) is an American science journalist. After working as a network news writer and producer for NBC News and ABC News, Entine moved into print journalism. Entine has written seven books and is a contributing columnist to newspapers and magazines. He is the founder and executive director of the science advocacy group the Genetic Literacy Project, and a former visiting scholar at the American Enterprise Institute. He is also the founder of the consulting company ESG Mediametrics.

== Early life ==
Entine was born in Philadelphia, Pennsylvania into an Ashkenazi Jewish family from eastern Europe and was raised in Reform Judaism. He graduated from Trinity College in Hartford, Connecticut, in 1974 with a B.A. in philosophy.

== Television ==
In high school, Entine worked as a weekend copyboy for the CBS owned-and-operated TV station then known as WCAU. In 1975, Entine was hired to write for the ABC News program AM America, which was renamed Good Morning America the following year. Entine worked for ABC News as a writer, assignment desk editor, and producer in New York City and Chicago from 1975 to 1983 for programs including the ABC Evening News, 20/20 and Nightline. He took a leave of absence from ABC News in 1981–1982 to study at the University of Michigan under a National Endowment for the Humanities fellowship in journalism.

Entine joined NBC News in New York in 1984 as a special segment producer for NBC Nightly News with Tom Brokaw, where he worked until 1990. In 1989, Entine and Brokaw collaborated to write and produce Black Athletes: Fact and Fiction, which was named Best International Sports Film of 1989. From 1989 to 1990, Entine served as executive in charge of documentaries at NBC News. He rejoined ABC News in 1991 as an investigative producer for Primetime. In 1993 Entine produced a story with reporter Sam Donaldson on eye surgery clinics that led to a lawsuit against ABC News, Entine, and Donaldson. The suit was dismissed by a federal appeals court, which concluded: "The only scheme here was a scheme to expose publicly any bad practices that the investigative team discovered, which is nothing fraudulent." In 1994, Entine produced a prime time special on the Miss America Pageant, "Miss America: Beyond the Crown" for NBC Entertainment.

== Body Shop controversy ==
In September 1994, Entine wrote an investigative article titled "Shattered Image: Is The Body Shop Too Good to Be True?" The article caused an international controversy and led to articles in The New York Times and a report on ABC World News Tonight. The Body Shop, the British-based international cosmetics company, which until that point had been considered a model "socially responsible" company, tried to block the story from being published. The case has become the subject of business and management ethics studies.

== Genetic Literacy Project ==
Entine is the executive director of the Genetic Literacy Project (GLP), an organization he founded. The GLP is a non-profit organization that promotes public awareness and discussion of genetics, biotechnology, evolution and science literacy. The site presents articles on topics related to food and agricultural genetics, as well as human genetics. It also aggregates articles from various published sources. GLP has posted articles taking positions against labeling GMO foods. In a Financial Times article, the Genetic Literacy Project site was described as a provider of information on genomics that is not readily accessible to the general public.

=== Accusations of being a Monsanto front group ===
US Right to Know, an advocacy group funded in large part by the Organic Consumers Association, raised concerns after the GLP ran a series of articles in 2014 supportive of crop biotechnology after the scientists had been encouraged to do so by American agrochemical and agricultural biotechnology corporation Monsanto. The GLP said the authors were not paid for their articles. Entine remarked that he had total control of the editing process and that there was nothing to disclose.

In 2020 and 2021 the GLP received US$741,183 and US$494,075 in donations, respectively.

== Books ==
Entine has written three books on genetics and two on chemicals. Let Them Eat Precaution: How Politics is Undermining the Genetic Revolution examines the controversy over genetic modification in agriculture.

Entine's first book, Taboo: Why Black Athletes Dominate Sports and Why We're Afraid to Talk About It was inspired by the documentary on black athletes written with Brokaw in 1989. It received reviews ranging from mostly positive to highly negative in The New York Times. Physical anthropologist Jonathan Marks characterized the book as "make-believe genetics applied to naively conceptualized groups of people."

In 2007, Entine published Abraham's Children: Race, Identity and the DNA of the Chosen People which examined the shared ancestry of Jews, Christians and Muslims, and addressed the question "Who is a Jew?" as seen through the prism of DNA. In a review of this book, geneticist Harry Ostrer wrote that Entine's "understanding of the genetics is limited and uncritical, but his broad, well-documented sweep of Jewish history will inform even the most knowledgeable of readers."

== Organizational affiliations ==
He was previously senior research fellow at the Center for Health & Risk Communication at George Mason University where he began in 2011 and at GMU's STATS (Statistical Assessment Service).

Entine joined the conservative American Enterprise Institute for Public Policy Research as an adjunct scholar in 2002 and was subsequently a visiting scholar. His research focuses on science and society and corporate sustainability. AEI Press has published three books written and edited by Entine: Crop Chemophobia: Will Precaution Kill the Green Revolution?, which analyzes the impact of chemicals in agriculture; Pension Fund Politics: The Dangers of Socially Responsible Investing, which focuses on the growing influence of social investing in pension funds; and Let Them Eat Precaution: How Politics Is Undermining the Genetic Revolution in Agriculture, which examined the debate over genetic modification (GMOs), food, and farming.

As of 2016, Entine was a senior fellow at the Institute Food and Agricultural Literacy at University of California Davis.

In 2012 when asked about affiliations between the agrochemical and agricultural biotechnology corporation Monsanto and his consulting company ESG Mediametrics, Entine said, "Nine years ago, I did a $2000 research project for v-Fluence, a social media company formed by former Monsanto executives. That's the entirety of my Monsanto relationship."

== Bibliography ==
- Taboo: Why Black Athletes Dominate Sports and Why We're Afraid to Talk About It, 2000, ISBN 1-58648-026-X
- Pension Fund Politics: The Dangers of Socially Responsible Investing, 2005, ISBN 0-8447-4218-X
- Scared to Death: How Chemophobia Threatens Public Health, 2011, ISBN 978-0-578-07561-7
- Let Them Eat Precaution: How Politics is Undermining the Genetic Revolution, 2006, ISBN 0-8447-4200-7
- Abraham's Children: Race, Identity and the DNA of the Chosen People, 2008, ISBN 0-446-58063-5
- No Crime But Prejudice: Fischer Homes, the Immigration Fiasco, and Extrajudicial Prosecution, 2009, ISBN 978-0-692-00282-7
- Crop Chemophobia: Will Precaution Kill the Green Revolution? 2011, ISBN 978-0-8447-4361-5
