= Edible vaccine =

Food that aids immunity against a disease

An edible vaccine is a food, typically plants, that contain vitamins, proteins or other nourishment that act as a vaccine against a certain disease. Once the plant, fruit, or plant derived product is ingested orally, it stimulates the immune system. Specifically, it stimulates both the mucosal and humoral immune systems. Edible vaccines are genetically modified crops that contain antigens for specific diseases. Edible vaccines offer many benefits over traditional vaccines, due to their lower manufacturing cost and a lack of negative side effects. However, there are limitations as edible vaccines are still new and developing. Further research will need to be done before they are ready for widespread human consumption. Edible vaccines are currently being developed for measles, cholera, foot and mouth disease, Hepatitis B and Hepatitis C.

== Benefits ==
Edible vaccines differ from traditional vaccines in many ways and overcome many of their limitations. Traditional vaccines can be too expensive or restricted to manufacture and develop in certain countries. In contrast, edible vaccines are easy to produce, purify, sterilize, and distribute. Since they do not require more expensive manufacturing equipment, only rich soil, the cost to grow the vaccines is significantly lowered. In addition, edible vaccines do not require sterilized production facilities or the biosafety standards required to cultivate certain pathogenic agents for traditional vaccines which are expensive to implement and maintain. They are also easier and less expensive to store since they do not require strict refrigerated storage. This necessity for cold chain storage creates many issues in third world countries. The seeds from an edible vaccine plant can also be easily dehydrated and preserved for cheap and quick distribution which makes them easily accessible in times of need.

Edible vaccines also offer a profuse amount of potential health benefits that edible vaccines have over traditional vaccines. Eating a vaccine is a simpler means of administration compared to injection, making them extremely economical. This reduces the need for medical personnel and sterile injection conditions that are not always achievable in developing countries. Edible vaccines are considered a "pharmafood" which is a food source that increases health while also fighting diseases. The benefit of using plants is that plants are efficient vectors for vaccine production. Many traditional vaccines that are developed from cultured mammalian cells can lead to contamination with animal viruses. However, edible vaccines eliminate this issue because plant viruses cannot impact humans. Moreover, as a result of numerous antigens being integrated, the M-cells are randomly stimulated; leading to the possibility of second-generation vaccines.

Edible vaccines do not require subsidiary elements to stimulate an immune response like traditional vaccines. Some major concerns with traditional vaccines are potential side effects, for example, allergic reactions. Since edible vaccines lack certain toxic compounds and only contain therapeutic proteins, which are free of pathogens and toxins, the risk of potential side effects and allergic reactions are greatly reduced.

== Limitations ==
Edible vaccines also have multiple disadvantages compared to traditional vaccines. Since edible vaccines are still in their infancy, there are still many unknowns left to discover. The adequate dosage amount and how long it lasts is still undetermined. The dosage varies due to many factors including: the plant generation, the individual plant, the protein content, the ripeness of the fruit and how much of it is eaten. The dosage also varies due to the difficulty in standardizing the concentration of the antigen in the plant tissue; it can be tedious to produce both consistently and large scale. The antigen concentration can also vary significantly between individual fruits on a plant, individual plants, and between plant generations. Low doses result in the consumption of less antibodies but a high dose results in establishing an oral and immune tolerance to the vaccine proteins.

Since it is such a new field, the long-term effects are still unknown. Additionally, the effects and risk of using pesticides on the plants could be negative towards both the plant vaccine and the consumer. There is also the risk of transgenic escape into the surrounding environment; however, this could be reduced by regulating growing practices and locations. Many plants are not eaten raw and the cooking could weaken or destroy the proteins in the vaccine. In a study, it was found that after boiling a potato for 5 minutes, half of the vaccine survived, thus showing that not all edible vaccines have to be ingested raw if dosages account for cooking times and temperatures. There is also a concern that the gastric enzymes and the acidic environment of the stomach will break down the vaccine before it can activate an immune response. Moreover, concerns have arisen regarding the vaccine behavior being different due to the differing glycosylation pattern of plants and humans.

== Production ==
Edible vaccines are subunit vaccines; they contain a antigen proteins for a pathogen but lack the genes for the full pathogen to form. The first steps in making an edible vaccine is the identification, isolation, and characterization of a pathogenic antigen. In order to be effective, the antigen needs to elicit a strong and specific immune response. Once the antigen is identified and isolated, the gene is cloned into a transfer vector. One of the most common transfer vectors for DNA being used for edible vaccines is Agrobacterium tumefaciens. The pathogen sequence is inserted into the transfer DNA (T-DNA) to produce the antigenic protein. It is then inserted into the genome, expressed, and inherited in a mendelian fashion, which results in the antigen being expressed in the fruit or plant. From that point forward, traditional vegetative methods and techniques are used to grow the plants and propagate the genetic line.

== Techniques ==
The entire gene is inserted into a plant transformation vector to allow transcription or the epitope within the antigen is identified and the DNA fragment can be used to construct genes by fusion with a coat protein gene from a plant virus. Then, the recombinant virus can infect other plants. The epitope is first identified, and then, DNA fragment encoding is used to construct genes by fusion with a coat protein gene from plant virus (TMV or CMV). The transgene can be expressed either through a stable transformation system or through transient transformation system based on where the transgene has been inserted into the cell.

=== Stable transformation ===
A stable transformation involves a nuclear or plasmid integration in which permanent changes occur in the recipient cells' genes and the targeted transgene is integrated into the genome of host plant cells.

=== Transient transformation ===
A transient transformation involves a plasmid/vector system using Agrobacterium tumefaciens which integrates the exogenous genes into the T-DNA, then infects the vegetable tissue. Agrobacterium is the common technique used currently because it's a pathogenic bacterium, found in soil that naturally infects plants and transfers their genes (T-DNA) to the nucleus of the plant. A. tumefaciens is the most preferred strain because it carries tumour-inducing plasmids. The genes will be made into a neutralized Ti-plasmid and the heterologous gene is inserted to form a recombinant plasmid vector. The vector is then turned into the desired strain with the help of the virulence genes of the bacterium. It is then transferred and integrated into the genomic DNA of the host plant by non-homologous recombination at random sites. This method has a low yield and is a slow process, and it is the most effective when used with dicotyledonous plants such as, tomato, potato, and tobacco.

=== Bombardment method ===
Another technique is the microprojectile bombardment method where selected DNA sequences are processed and penetrated into the chloroplast genome. The gene containing DNA coated metal particles are fired at the plant cells using a gene gun. The plants take up the DNA, grow into new plants, then are cloned to produce large numbers of genetically identical crops. The gene transfer is independent, and it can express antigens through nuclear and chloroplast transformation.

=== Additional methods ===
There are a few other techniques that have been tested, however, the three techniques describe above are more common and practical. One of the alternative methods is nuclear transformation. This is when the desired gene is inserted into the plant nucleus through non-homologous recombination. Furthermore, electroporation has been considered, but it is not common because the cell wall has to be weakened before the pulses and DNA insertion can occur. Lastly, it is thought that molecular farming can be used so that the plants can be used as protein factories.

== Immune response ==
After the vaccine is orally ingested, it reaches the digestive tract mucosa and stimulates the mucosal immune system. These provide the first-line of defense against attacking pathogens. The M-cells (found in Peyer's patches) in the mucous membranes of the lymphoid tissues push the antigens to the antigen presenting cells in the underlying tissues. The antigenic epitopes are then shown on the antigen presenting cells' surface and the T-cells activate the B-cells. The activated B-cells then move to the mesenteric lymph nodes where they become plasma cells and move to the mucous membrane to produce immunoglobulin A (IgA) (a type of antibody). Then the M-cells channel the antigen. As the cells go toward the lumen, the IgA combine with secretary components to make secretory IgA (sIgA). Then, the sIgA and the specific antigenic epitopes work together to eliminate the unwanted pathogen.

== Research ==
Current research has focused on a variety of different types of plants in order to determine which is the most eligible and efficient. The plant has to be robust, nutritious, appetizing, transformable, and ideally domestic. Some examples of crops that are being tested include: corn, tomato, rice, carrots, soybeans, alfalfa, papaya, quinoa, peas, apples, algae, wheat, lettuce, potatoes, bananas, and tobacco; with the last four being the most common. When looking at which plants are the best, there are many factors that must be taken into account. From the research, scientists have started to pair crops with diseases. They believe that edible vaccines can be made for many diseases; such as, rotavirus, cholera, gastroenteritis, autoimmune disease, malaria and rabies For example, they think that booster shots can be distributed through lettuce. It is also essential to find foods that can be eaten raw because it is thought that cooking would denature the proteins. Because of this, bananas and tomatoes have become top viable options. While bananas are productionally inexpensive and native in many underdeveloped nations, tomatoes have the ability to preserve healing processes because they are immune to thermal process; this makes them great for HIV antigens. They are an ideal crop because they contain beta-amyloid. Even though crops seem optimal, it is also necessary to look at the by-products. For example, tobacco has been found to be good for recombinant protein production, it is unsuitable for vaccine production because the plant also produces toxic compounds. Additionally, potatoes have been a main focus for edible vaccines, so much so that clinical trials using potatoes has already began.

=== Vaccines in development ===
Presently, there are edible vaccines for measles, cholera, foot and mouth disease, and hepatitis B, C, & E. However, even though there are edible vaccines, they are predominately tested in the animal testing and in development phases, with some human clinical trials being conducted. As mentioned above, the human trials have revolved around potatoes. In one cholera study, adults were given transgenic potatoes with various LT-B amounts in order to see how their IgA anti-LT and IgA anti LT amounts changed. Furthermore, they are in phase II on a potato vaccine booster for hepatitis B. Hepatitis B surface antigens were expressed in the potatoes and were given to already vaccinated patients. It was then observed if an immune response occurred. 95% of the volunteers had some form of an immune response, and 62.5% showed an increase in anti-HBsAg titers. From these studies, the National Institute of Allergy and Infectious Disease has supported that edible vaccines can safely trigger an immune response, however, it is also known that they are far from being able to begin large scale human testing for autoimmunity and infectious diseases.

=== Animal testing ===
Many animal studies have already been developed. For example, experimental animals were given transgenic bananas with anti-hemagglutination specific antibodies to combat measles. It was found that the bananas did initiate an immune response. Moreover, mice trials have started as a method to treat Alzheimer's using tomatoes that have undergone agrobacterium mediated nuclear transformation. Additionally, rabbits were orally immunized with an edible vaccine for bovine pneumonic pasteurellosis, and there was a positive response. While those were two specific studies, generally speaking, research using mice models are being conducted to treat cholera and type 1 diabetes.

=== Availability ===
While the public awareness regarding edible vaccines is increasing, they are still not available for consumer use. Currently, they have only developed and started testing edible vaccines for some diseases. During three of the recent disease outbreaks around the world, edible vaccines have been developed for testing on animals but have not reached human trials. Also, it has been found that a biotechnological company has started to develop a patent and are working on beginning clinical trials for a transmissible gastroenteritis virus.
