= Don Grierson (geneticist) =

British geneticist (born 1945)

Don Grierson OBE FRS FRSB
- Born: Donald Grierson; 1 October 1945 (age 81)
- Education: University of East Anglia (BSc); University of Edinburgh (PhD)
- Awards: Bertebos Prize
- Scientific career
- Workplaces: University of Nottingham; Zhejiang University
- Thesis: Synthesis of ribosomal ribonucleic acid in developing primary leaves of Phaseolus aureus (1972)
- Doctoral advisor: Ulrich Loening

Don Grierson is a British geneticist, and Emeritus Professor at University of Nottingham.

== Education ==
Grierson graduated from the University of East Anglia with a degree in Biological Sciences in 1967, after working for a short time in an industrial research lab, he obtained his PhD in Plant Science from the University of Edinburgh in 1972 for research on ribosomal ribonucleic acid in developing primary leaves of the mung bean Phaseolus aureus supervised by Ulrich Loening.

== Career and research ==
Grierson was a member of academic staff at University of Nottingham for over 40 years where he was awarded a Doctor of Science (DSc) degree in 1999. He was the founding professor of the School of Biosciences before becoming Pro-Vice-Chancellor for Research.

Grierson discovered several plant genes and studied their role in tomato ripening. He also was the first to identify and characterise genes for ACC oxidase (ACO) and demonstrated its role in the synthesis of the hormone ethylene. Grierson was among the first to achieve silencing of plant genes in transgenic plants using antisense (1988, 1990) and sense genes (1990). He was involved in creating a genetically modified tomato in the 1990s which ripened more slowly, a tomato purée made from the tomatoes was the first genetically modified food to be sold in the UK. His research collaborators include Harry Smith.

=== Awards and honours ===
Grierson was elected fellow of the Institute of Biology in 1985, awarded a research medal by the Royal Agricultural Society of England for "outstanding research in agriculture" in 1990. In 2000 he appointed Order of the British Empire (OBE) for "services to plant gene regulation". In 2001 he received the Bertebos Prize, from the Royal Swedish Academy for Agriculture & Forestry for "pioneering research in modern plant biotechnology". He is now an emeritus professor at Nottingham and also has a part-time position as Guang Biao professor at Zhejiang University. In 2017, he was elected as a foreign member of the Chinese Academy of Engineering (CAE).
