= Agriculture in Hawaii =

Agriculture is an important part of the economy of Hawaii. Though Hawaii relies heavily on imports of food from mainland United States and other parts of the world, export of cash crop specific to the tropical growing environment of Hawaii has made agriculture one of the more important economic sectors.

During the early part of control of Hawaii by the United States, early cash crops included pineapple and sugar, which were tightly controlled by a small network of businessmen, the "Big Five", who monopolized control of the sugar industry's profits. The industry has since diversified in terms of ownership in exports.

According to the USDA in 2022, the state of Hawaii had over 7,300 farm operations working on 1,100,000 acres. By weight, honey bees may be the state's most valuable export. According to the Hawaii Agricultural Statistics Service, agricultural sales were US$370.9 million from diversified agriculture, US$100.6 million from pineapple, and US$64.3 million from sugarcane. Hawaii's relatively consistent climate has attracted the seed industry, which is able to test three generations of crops per year on the islands, compared with one or two on the mainland. Seeds yielded US$264 million in 2012, supporting 1,400 workers.

== Historic practices ==
=== Aquaculture ===
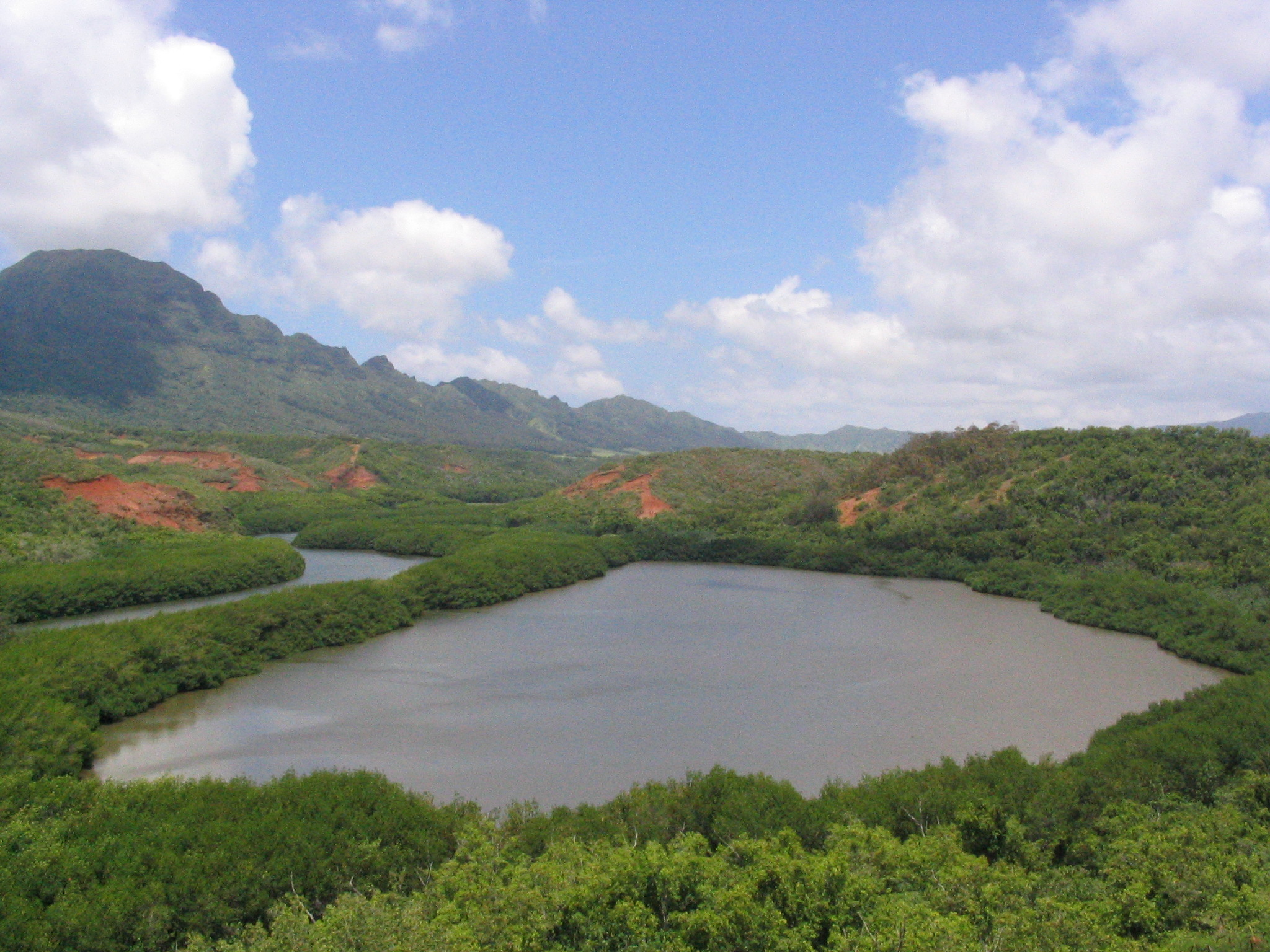
Alekoko "Menehune" fishpond

Before contact with Europeans, the Hawaiian people practiced aquaculture through development of fish ponds (Hawaiian: loko iʻa), the most advanced fish-husbandry among the original peoples of the Pacific. While other cultures in places like Egypt and China also used the practice, Hawaii's aquaculture was very advanced considering the much smaller size of the area of Hawaii compared to other aquacultural societies. Hawaiian fishponds were typically shallow areas of a reef flat surrounded by a low lava rock wall (loko kuapa) built out from the shore. Several species of edible fish (such as mullet) thrive in such ponds, and Hawaiians developed methods to make them easy to catch.

"The full-scale development of loko i‘a (fishponds) from mauka (the mountains) to makai (the ocean) dates back over half a millennium. Cultivation and propagation centered on many different fresh and salt-water plants and animals, with the primary species being the prized ‘ama‘ama (mullet) and ‘awa (milkfish). An inventory in the early 1900s found 360 loko i‘a in the islands and identified 99 active ponds with an estimated annual production total of about 680,000 pounds, including 486,000 pounds of ‘ama‘ama and 194,000 pounds of ‘awa. Loko i‘a were extensive operating systems that produced an average of 400–600 pounds per acre per year, a significant amount considering the minimal amount of fishpond 'input' and maintenance effort apparent by that time."

— "A Manual on Hawaiian Fishpond Restoration and Management" CTAHR University of Hawai'i

== Crops ==
=== Coffee ===
Hawaii is one of the few U.S. states where coffee production is a significant economic industry – coffee is the second largest crop produced there. The 2019–2020 coffee harvest in Hawaii was valued at $102.9 million. As of the 2019–2020 harvest, coffee production accounted for 6,900 acres of land in Hawaii.

The coffee industry in Hawaii is well supported by organizations such as the Hawaii Coffee Association, the Hawaii Agriculture Resource Center and the College of Tropical Agriculture and Human Resources, University of Hawaii at Manoa and the state's Department of Agriculture.

=== Macadamia nuts ===
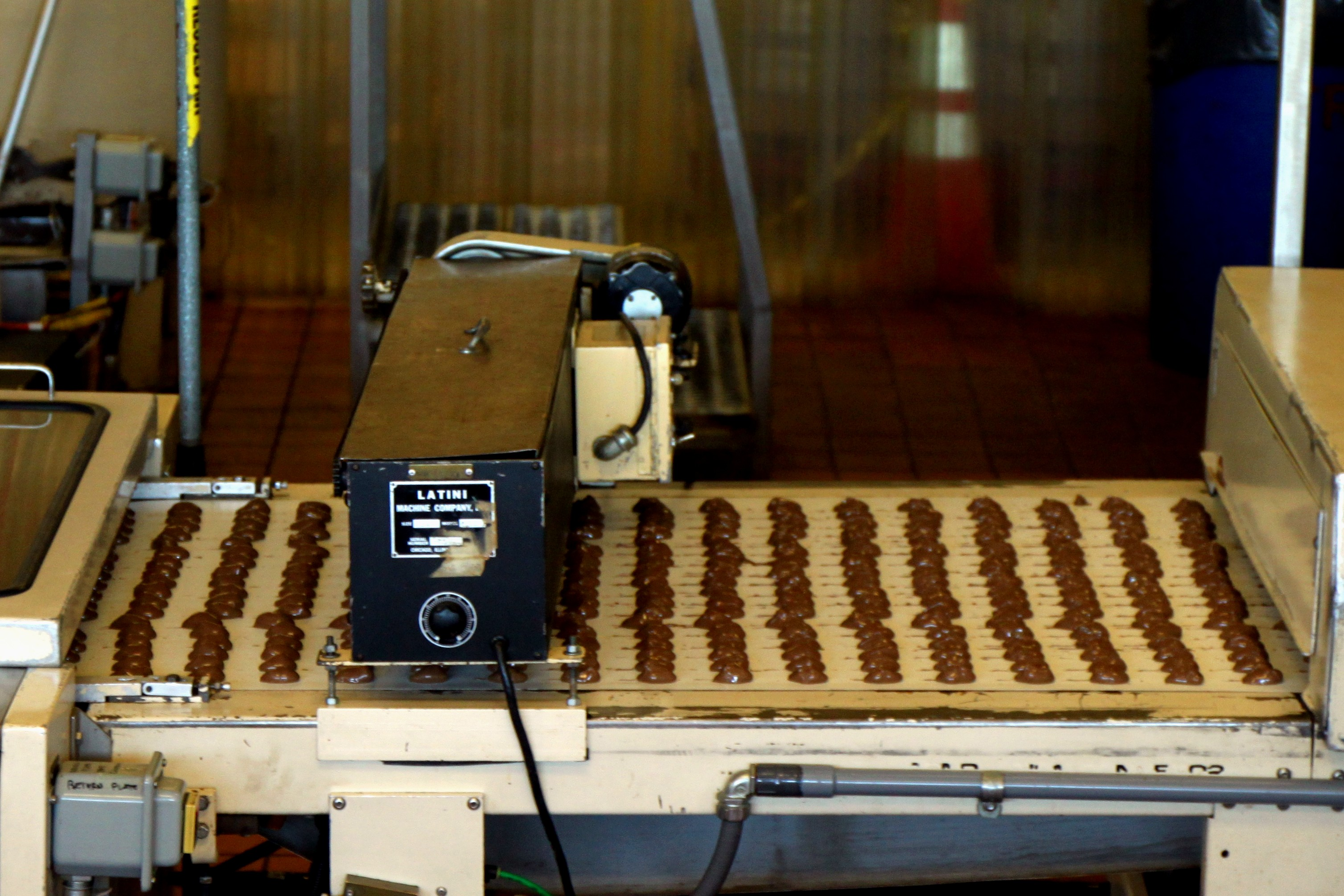
Mauna Loa Macadamia Nut & Chocolate Factory

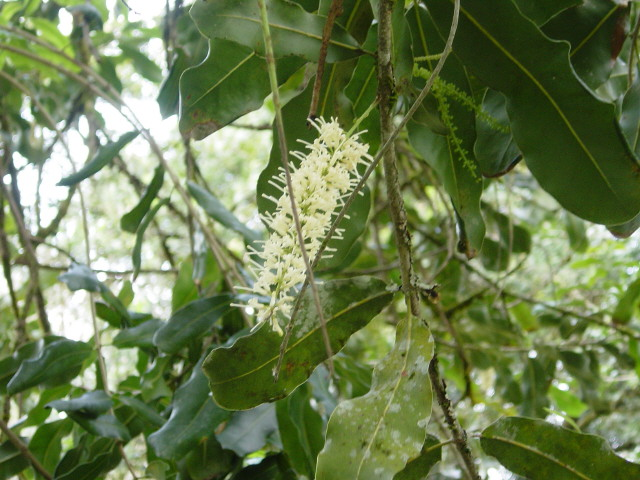
Blossoms of a macadamia nut tree at Mauna Loa Macadamia nut plantation near Hilo, Hawaii on the Big Island of Hawaii

Mauna Loa Macadamia Nut Corporation is the world's largest processor of macadamia seeds. The American company was a subsidiary of The Hershey Company from 2004 to 2015, when it was acquired by Hawaiian Host, Inc. The company takes its name from the volcano Mauna Loa. Their headquarters and main processing plant are near the mountain, south of Hilo in the Puna District of the island of Hawaiʻi, known as the Big Island.

=== Sugar ===
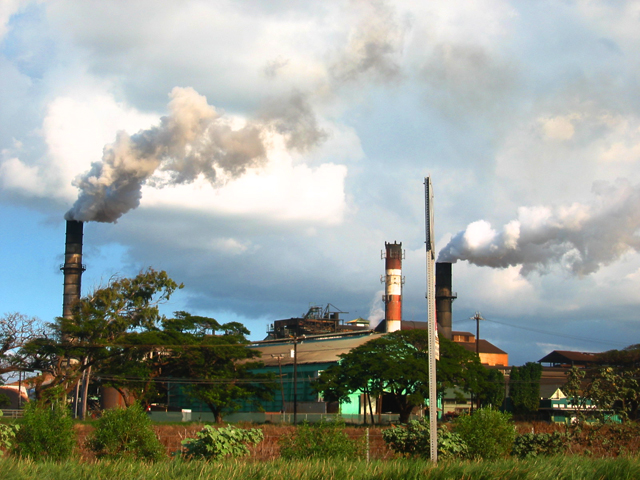
Hawaiian Commercial & Sugar Company's Puunene mill on Maui was the last operating sugar mill in Hawaiʻi

Sugarcane was introduced to Hawaiʻi by its first inhabitants in approximately 600 AD and was observed by Captain Cook upon arrival in the islands in 1778. Sugar quickly turned into a big business and generated rapid population growth in the islands with 337,000 people immigrating over the span of a century. The sugar grown and processed in Hawaiʻi was shipped primarily to the United States and, in smaller quantities, globally. Sugarcane and pineapple plantations were the largest employers in Hawaiʻi. Sugar production ended in 2016, with a small quantity of sugarcane still being grown for the manufacture of Rhum agricole.

=== Wine ===
Hawaii wine is wine made in the U.S. state of Hawaii. The bulk of the state's wine is produced on the island of Maui, though there is some production on the island of Hawaii. The state mainly produces fruit wine such as a pineapple sparkling wine.
Viticulture in Hawaii has roots back into the early 1800's when cuttings from plants brought to Oahu by Spanish horticulturist, Don Francisco de Paula Marin established Hawaii's first grape vineyard in 1815. In June 2021, Ulupalakua AVA was established on Maui as the state's initial American Viticultural Area (AVA) and the only one outside of the mainland United States.

== Issues ==
=== GMOs ===
Genetic engineering in Hawaii is a hotly contested political topic. The Hawaiian Islands counties of Kauai, Hawaii and Maui passed or considered laws restricting the practice within their borders due to concerns about the health, the environment and impacts on conventional and organic agriculture.

Hawaii is attractive to researchers and seed companies because of its moderate year-round climate—an average of 75 °F (24 °C), which allows 3 or more harvests per year, greatly reducing the length of time required to develop a new seed.

The main companies working with genetically modified crops in Hawaii are Monsanto, Syngenta, Pioneer Hi-Bred, BASF, Mycogen Seeds and Agrigentics.

Gene manipulation is generally conducted elsewhere. Hawaii sites cross the engineered strains with other strains to eliminate undesirable traits and cultivate the hybrids to produce seeds that are then planted elsewhere.

== See also ==
- Hawaiian Agriculture Research Center
