= Genetically modified food in Hawaii =

Genetic engineering in Hawaii is a hotly contested political topic. The Hawaiian Islands counties of Kauai, Hawaii and Maui passed or considered laws restricting the practice within their borders due to concerns about the health, the environment and impacts on conventional and organic agriculture.

Hawaii is attractive to researchers and seed companies because of its moderate year-round climate—an average of 75 °F (24 °C), which allows 3 or more harvests per year, greatly reducing the length of time required to develop a new seed.

The main companies working with genetically modified crops in Hawaii are Monsanto, Syngenta, Pioneer Hi-Bred, BASF, Mycogen Seeds and Agrigentics.

Gene manipulation is generally conducted elsewhere. Hawaii sites cross the engineered strains with other strains to eliminate undesirable traits and cultivate the hybrids to produce seeds that are then planted elsewhere.

== History ==
In the 1960s James Brewbaker, a recently arrived researcher at the University of Hawaii, noticed he could plant three crops a year in Hawaii's warm climate instead of one as on the mainland.

Seed companies began operating in Hawaii soon after, decades before genetic engineering was possible. Some 90 percent of U.S. corn strains were partially developed in Hawaii. DuPont subsidiary Pioneer Hi-Bred International began producing GM corn and soy in Hawaii in the mid-1990s, when the FDA approved the crops for commercial sale.

As of 2008, Hawaii had been the site of more than 2,230 field trials of genetically modified (GM) crops, including corn, soybeans, cotton, potatoes, wheat, alfalfa, beets, rice, safflower and sorghum. This rose to 3,236 as of 2014.

== Conventional agriculture ==
In 2008, Hawaii farmers produced 1.67 million tons of raw sugar, nearly one million tons less than a decade earlier; only 13,900 acres (5,600 ha) were planted in pineapples in 2006 [the latest year for which pineapple statistics are available) compared with 76,700 acres in 1991.

Other major crops include flowers and nursery plants, macadamia nuts, coffee, milk, algae, tomatoes, bananas and papayas.

== Genetically modified agriculture ==
In 2008 Some 4,800 acres (1,900 ha) were dedicated to GM crops across the state, of which 3,500 were corn and soybean seed crops, 1,000 acres papaya, and the remainder field trials for GM crops. As of 2013 this had increased to 25,000 acres (10,000 ha) of the state's 280,000 acres of agricultural land, on the islands of Kauai, Oahu, Maui and Molokai. Nearly fifty percent of the total (11,000 acres) is on Kauai.

Seeds yielded $264 million in 2012, supporting 1,400 workers. Seeds exceeded the value of the state's next several largest crops combined—including sugarcane and macadamia nuts. As of 2008 genetically engineered corn seed was the top crop by value in Hawaii. It made up 92 percent of the state's GM seed industry.

=== Seed crops ===
Seeds containing government-approved modifications are grown in the islands to evaluate how they perform in the field, to be crossed with unmodified strains to further improve the strain and to produce seed for sale. Cultivating corn seed involves having workers place paper bags over the tassels to catch pollen for use in hand pollinating other plots. At Syngenta plants are individually barcoded, then paper punches are used to take leaf cuttings that are freeze dried and genetically analyzed in North Carolina. The analysis indicates whether each plant has the desired suite of traits. Undesirable plants are uprooted and the rest cultivated through another cycle.

Successful strains are then planted in places such as Missouri, Manitoba, Canada and Mexico to make sure the corn is able to thrive in varied situations before they are marketed.

Developing a new seed variety takes 10–12 growth cycles or 3–7 years, a fraction of the 13 years on the mainland.

=== Papaya ===
An outbreak of papaya ringspot virus in the mid-'90s decimated Hawaii's papaya trees. GM papaya, endowed with a gene from the virus, immunized the tree. Both Japanese and American regulators approved the modified papaya. It subsequently reduced the use of pesticides that growers had used to control the virus-carrying aphids.

In 2010 Hawaii Island had around 200 papaya farmers. Papayas were the US' only commercial GM fruit and accounted for three-quarters of the island's 30 million pound harvest. GM papaya was developed primarily by academic scientists. Its lead developer was Hawaii-born Dennis Gonsalves. He and his team were awarded the 2002 Humboldt Prize for the most significant contribution to US agriculture in five years.

GM papaya is largely self-pollinating. If planted about 12 or more feet away from other varieties, little cross-pollination occurs.

Critic Jeffrey Smith claimed that it could harm people because of the protein produced by the new gene and that no studies had been conducted. Gonsalves claimed that ringspot-infected papaya contained that same protein and that people had been eating infected papaya for decades with no ill effects.

One night in July 2011 thousands of papaya trees were destroyed on 10 acres of Hawaii Island farmland. Some farmers and Kevin Richards, director of regulatory relations for the American Farm Bureau Federation, called the attack an act of eco-terrorism.

== Research activities ==
=== University of Hawaii ===
The University of Hawaii has conducted research on disease-resistant bananas, a new variety of papaya, Spanish lime, the potential of gene flow between cotton strains, animal genomes and Acacia koa.

In 2012 Monsanto donated $600,000 for student scholarships to the University's College of Tropical Agriculture and Human Resources, an amount that the college claimed represented about 1 percent of its budget. In 2014, The Monsanto Fellowship Awards award CTARH 120,000.

=== Water efficient maize for Africa ===
This public-private humanitarian project is led by African Agricultural Technology Foundation, a Kenyan non-governmental organization. It is funded by the Bill and Melinda Gates Foundation. It combines conventional breeding and genetic engineering. Monsanto donated its genetic engineering technology and Maui-grown seeds with insect and drought tolerance traits.

=== Improved maize for African soils ===
This humanitarian effort is led by the International Maize and Wheat Improvement Center in Mexico, funded by the Gates foundation and the US Agency for International Development. Pioneer donates testing and breeding resources from Kauai. The project is developing nitrogen-efficient hybrids that can improve yields on African soils. The product will be made available royalty-free to seed companies.

== Concerns ==
Since their inception genetically engineered crops have been subject to a variety of concerns, which in some jurisdictions led to restrictions on research, cultivation and/or consumption.

=== Resistance ===
As with any pesticide use, pests can become resistant to those used with (or incorporated into) GM crops.

For example, Bt corn incorporates the insecticidal cry genes from the Bacillus thuringiensis bacteria. Organic farmers have long used the bacteria as an insecticide. If insects become resistant, organic farmers will have to look elsewhere. "One of the biggest concerns with growing crops like Bt corn is that you're putting insects under the greatest selection pressure to become resistant to Bt", according to Bill Freese of the Center For Food Safety.

=== Gene flow ===
Gene flow occurs when genes migrate from one strain to another by unintended pollination. Organic farmers continue to grow conventional (non-GM) papayas in Hawaii. Organic farmers and environmental organizations in Hawaii have expressed concern that crops grown from ostensibly non-GM seeds may test positive for modifications. This concern led South Korea to stop buying papayas from Hawaii Island and led Japan to require organic papaya farmers to test their crops.

=== Labeling ===
The US Food and Drug Administration does not require GM foods to be labeled, instead claiming that GM crops are as safe as crops developed by conventional breeding.

The European Food Safety Authority certifies new GM products as safe for consumers and the environment. The European Union's 27 member states then individually decide whether to accept the certification. Genetically modified foods must be labeled. As of 2008 Bt corn had been approved to grow in Spain, Germany, the Czech Republic and Portugal.

The seed companies conduct the safety tests for new GM food products, reporting safety and nutritional information to the FDA for its evaluation.

=== Agricultural chemicals ===
From 2006 to 2008, students and teachers at Kauai's Waimea Canyon Middle School, which is near a Syngenta field, repeatedly complained of noxious odors. At one point, the buildings were evacuated and "some kids went to the hospital". Some doctors found unusually high rates of asthma, cancer and birth defects there.

A state report found that cancer incidence on Kauai, including the region around the school, was generally the same or lower than the state as a whole. Another study, paid for by the state and county, claimed that the odors were from stinkweed.

Voluntary reporting by the companies showed substantial use of chlorpyrifos, which at sufficient doses can have neurological impacts on children.

"Use of conventional pesticides recommended for control of the European corn borer has dropped by about one-third since Bt corn was introduced,” according to the US Environmental Protection Agency.

=== Toxicity ===
Pioneer Hi-Bred claimed that since 1996 "over a trillion meals containing biotech ingredients have been consumed in the U.S. with no documented negative health impacts."

=== Culture ===
Cultural practitioners claimed that GMOs were not part of traditional Hawaiian agriculture and did not belong in Hawaii.

== Local government action ==
=== Kauai ===
The Kauai County Council passed a law in 2013, over the mayor's veto, to require large farms to create 500 foot buffer zones around their fields and to disclose the pesticides that they use. Seed companies Syngenta, Pioneer, BASF and Agrigentics sued to stop the law, claiming that state and federal regulations were adequate.

In August 2014 US District Court of Hawaii judge Barry Kurren overturned the law, finding for the plaintiffs. The judge found that "the Ordinance is pre-empted by state law and is therefore invalid".

After it was overturned, Syngenta claimed that it had been voluntarily notifying nearby schools and residences one week before any pesticide applications and that while the law required 500 feet buffers, the company had not farmed within 1,500 feet of any dwelling for years.

=== Hawaii Island ===
In November 2008 the Hawaii County Council (county legislature) voted to ban the growth of GM taro (a Hawaiian staple) and coffee to prevent GM crop pollen from reaching other strains.

In 2013 a second bill banned the cultivation of any GM crop on the island, grandfathering in papaya and corn planted by a dairy to feed its cows. Field tests to study new GM crops were prohibited. Penalties were set at $1,000 per day.

=== Maui ===
In 2014, 9,000 Maui citizens signed a petition sponsored by the SHAKA Movement calling for a moratorium on GMO production and research. The initiative specified penalties including fines and jail for knowing violations and did not limit its scope to commercial agriculture. The initiative was to be voted on in the November 2014 election.

Proponents claimed that the moratorium would affect only 2% of the island's agricultural acreage and 1% of existing farms.

Proponent Ashley Lukens, Hawaii Center for Food Safety Director said, "Hawaii hosts more genetic engineering test sites than any other state. We had 1,124 field tests last year. California had 184."

Opposing group Citizens Against the Maui County Farming Ban Initiative claimed that the measure was 'anti-farming' and would cost the county 600 jobs. Other opponents including former State Attorney General Michael Lilly and Mayor Alan Arakawa who claimed that the initiative was poorly drafted. Mycogen employee Adolph Helm was claimed by a moratorium proponent to be the leader of the opponents.

==== Aftermath ====
The initiative passed on November 4 by about 50.2 to 47.9 percent, with the remaining ballots left blank. Federal U.S. Magistrate Judge Barry Kurren said Maui County may not implement until he considers arguments in a lawsuit against the measure. Both sides have agreed to delay the date the law goes into effect. Monsanto Co. and a unit of Dow Chemical Co. sued the county to stop the law. Company employees and Maui County businesses joined the lawsuit. The suit claimed that the law would harm the economy and their businesses, citing the Kauai County case. They continued that the state, and not the county, has jurisdiction. The county and the plaintiffs must provide arguments for their position by December 1. Initiative supporters filed a separate suit in state court, attempting to compel the county to implement the law.

The next sections summarize the initiative.

==== Allegations ====
GM agriculture threatens Hawaiian culture, the rest of Maui agriculture, human health and the environment. The claims were:

- Commercial GM agriculture is growing rapidly and existing regulation is inadequate.
- Maui citizens have the right to suspend GM agriculture.
- GMOs are not native to Maui County and instead are possibly invasive species. The right to exclude GMOs is supported by the Hawaiian Public Trust Doctrine, the Hawaii State Constitution and other State and County environmental laws.
- Genetic engineering is imprecise, with unpredictable, uncontrollable results that produce unintended consequences. Mixing plant, animal, bacterial and viral genes is highly risky.
- The majority of GM crops are engineered for herbicide-resistance (93% of 2013 US soy), promoting indiscriminate use. Such crops have added 527 million pounds of herbicides to US farmland. These herbicides damage soil, harm wildlife, contaminate drinking water and risk consumer and farm worker health.
- GMO-driven herbicide overuse produced resistant "superweeds" that force farmers to use increasingly toxic and expensive herbicides.
- GMO-driven insecticide use risks producing resistant "superbugs" that force conventional and organic farmers to use more and/or stronger insecticides.
- Some GMO farmers simultaneously or in quick succession apply multiple pesticides, often on test crops, possibly creating unknown compounds. Testing and regulation of such combinations is inadequate, specifically in animal or human studies.
- Existing county, state and federal oversight is inadequate.
- The Hawaii Department of Agriculture's regulatory structure is inadequate to monitor GMOs or to aid in citizens' understanding of their impacts. These impacts have not been properly or independently evaluated.
- Organic farming is a rapidly expanding sector of Maui's agricultural economy.
- Protecting land and water is crucial to the success of tourism, the County's largest employer.
- Preserving the identity, quality and reliability of the County's agricultural products is critical to its economic well-being.
- Many foreign markets prohibit GMOs and a single instance of an accidental GM hybrid in a conventional or organic crop resulted in buyer rejection.
- Accidental cross-pollination, co-mingling of conventional and GM seeds and transfer by animals or weather events puts GM crops where they are not intended. More than 50% of Hawaii County conventional papaya have become pollinated by GM papaya.
- Those who lose acceptance as conventional and/or organic suppliers as a result of such accidents lack adequate legal recourse.
- No proven procedures exist to eliminate GMOs from an area once they have escaped their intended environment.
- GMOs in Maui County primarily involve seed and test crops that include repeated use of pesticides, risking significant harm to soil resources. Soil microbes are harmed by such pesticides.
- The County's groundwater is significantly contaminated with pesticides, including DBCP and TCP, from prior pineapple crops. GMO production adds to the problem. (reference?)
- Pesticides are applied to fallow GM fields, adding to the problem of pesticide runoff, which harm ground and surface water, beaches and reefs.
- Wind-blown pesticide residues risk significant harm to air resources, farm workers and downwind residents.

==== Rights and authority ====
The initiative claimed that localities have the right to regulate GM crops because:

- Hawaii Revised Statutes, Section 46-1.5(13) grants counties the right to pass ordinances to protect health, life, property and preserve order as long as such ordinances comply with any applicable state statue.
- Hawaii Constitution Article XI, Section 1 grants political subdivisions the right to uphold the Public Trust Doctrine, and grants all persons legal standing to enforce such rights.
- Hawaii State Constitution, Article XI, Section 9 grants each person the right to a clean and healthful environment and grants any person standing to enforce this right through the courts.
- Hawaii State Constitution, Article XI, Section 1 compels political subdivisions to conserve and protect Hawaii's natural beauty and natural resources in furtherance of the State's self-sufficiency.
- The US Supreme Court held in Maine v. Taylor, 477 U.S. 131 (1986) that the US Constitution's Commerce Clause did not preempt states and localities from protecting health and safety and natural resources or force them to wait for scientific consensus or potentially irreversible environmental damage occurs before acting. Taking action absent such consensus is known as the precautionary principle.
- The County initiative process allows citizens to enact such protective ordinances.

==== Purposes ====
The stated purposes of the ordinance are to:

- protect against the spread of GMOs outside of their intended areas
- defend organic and conventional crops
- protect against hazardous practices including pesticides
- preserve citizens' right to reject GMOs for health, moral or other reasons;
- preserve the environment and Public Trust resources, while promoting Maui's cultural heritage and traditional Hawaiian agriculture.

==== Moratorium ====
The moratorium ordinance prohibits propagating, cultivating or testing GMOs within the County.

The moratorium does not apply to: GMO crops in mid-growth cycle when the moratorium is enacted, GM products that have been incorporated into food or medicine already prepared for consumption; licensed health practitioners whose practice employs GMOs; and non-commercial research conducted under enclosed indoor laboratory conditions by accredited colleges or universities.

The moratorium is lifted once an Environmental and Public Health Impacts Study (EPHIS) approved by 6 of the 9 Council members and a public hearing is completed. The Council must further determine that the GMOs provide health benefits and protect the County's natural beauty and natural resources.

The initiative does not include specific restrictions on GM agriculture following the end of the moratorium.

==== Environmental and Public Health Impacts Study (EPHIS) ====
Lifting the moratorium requires an Environmental and Public Health Impacts Study (EPHIS) conducted by the County through a two-phase, community-based process. The EPHIS must be funded by private entities.

Within ninety days of receiving such funding, the Council is to create a Joint Fact Finding Group (JFFG) of scientists and health experts with no GM industry ties, facilitated by a professional consultant, to design the study. The JFFG shall notify the community and allow a thirty-day public input period. The final scope, design, results and raw data must be published on the County's website. The study's minimum scope includes the potential for:

- GMO release beyond GM operational boundaries
- Recall of released GMOs
- Pesticides used singly and in combination to harm groundwater, surface water, oceans and reefs
- Pesticide-laden air and dust to harm people and the environment;
- Untested pesticide combinations that may be harmful to people and the environment;
- Gene transfer from GMOs to other species
- Birth defects arising from proximity to GM operations in Maui County or Kauai County

The EPHIS must be conducted by a non-biased, professional consultant independent of GE industry ties overseen by the JFFG and completed within eighteen months of the publication of the study's final scope and design. The process includes a ninety-day public comment period with four public hearings, including one on Molokai. The study must address relevant information, data, comments and public concerns. The study may recommend actions for the County to address significant effects on the environment, Public Trust Resources and public health. The final results and all raw data must be published on the County's website.

==== Enforcement ====
The County may implement regulations to manage the moratorium, but the regulations may not create any exemptions from the ordinance.

The County may seek a court order to enjoin any person or entity from violating the ordinance.

Civil penalties are:

- $10,000.00 for a first violation
- $25,000.00 for a second violation
- $50,000.00 for each subsequent violation

Each day of violation is considered a separate violation.

Criminal penalties are in addition to civil penalties. Violations are misdemeanors punishable by a fine of up to $2,000, or imprisonment for up to one year, or both, for each offense. Each additional post-conviction day of violation constitutes an additional offense. In addition, 60 days after a notification of noncompliance, the County may enter the property and remove infringing crops at the violator's expense.

Sixty days after notifying the County and the alleged violator, any injured citizen may seek an injunction against the violation. The court may award the plaintiff reasonable costs and attorney fees, but not punitive damages.

== Companies ==
=== Syngenta ===
Syngenta earns $4 billion on its Bt corn, vegetable and flower seeds, which are grown in 90 countries. As of 2014 it cultivated 4,000 acres on Kauai.

== See also ==
- Genetic engineering in the United States
- Genetic engineering § Controversies
- Genetically modified food controversies
