= Genetically modified food in the United States =

The United States is the largest grower of commercial crops that have been genetically engineered in the world, but not without domestic and international opposition.

Monsanto, based in Creve Coeur, Missouri, in the United States, is the leading producer of genetically engineered seed; it sells 90% of the world's GE seeds.

== Legislation ==
See Farmer Assurance Provision. (This bill is commonly referred to as the “Monsanto Protection Act” by its critics.)

== Lawsuits ==
=== Foundation on Economic Trends v. Heckler ===
In 1983, environmental groups and protestors delayed the field tests of the genetically modified ice-minus strain of P. syringae with legal challenges.Foundation on Economic Trends v. Heckler, 756 F.2d 143 (D.C. Cir. 1985).

=== Alliance for Bio-Integrity v. Shalala ===
In this case, the plaintiff argued both for mandatory labeling on the basis of consumer demand, and that GMO foods should undergo the same testing requirements as food additives because they are "materially changed" and have potentially unidentified health risks. The plaintiff also alleged that the FDA did not follow the Administrative Procedures Act in formulating and disseminating its policy on GMO's. The federal district court rejected all of those arguments and found that the FDA's determination that GMO's are generally recognized as safe was neither arbitrary nor capricious. The court gave deference to the FDA's process on all issues, leaving future plaintiffs little legal recourse to challenge the FDA's policy on GMO's.^{(pp. 755–756)} Alliance for Bio-Integrity v Shalala, 116 F.Supp.2d 166 (D.D.C. 2000).

=== Diamond v. Chakrabarty ===
Diamond v. Chakrabarty, 447 U.S. 303 (1980), was a United States Supreme Court case dealing with whether genetically modified organisms can be patented. The Court held that a living, man-made micro-organism is patentable subject matter as a "manufacture" or "composition of matter" within the meaning of the Patent Act of 1952. The fact that the organism sought to be patented is alive is no bar to patentability.

== Revenue ==
- Seed sales
- Income from GMO crops
  - Genetically modified soybeans are a big part of the US agricultural economy
  - Genetically modified maize (there are also issues with cross-pollination)

== Opposition ==
Numerous organizations based in the U.S. oppose or have concerns about genetic engineering for various reasons. Groups such as the Center for Food Safety, the nonprofit science advocacy group Union of Concerned Scientists, Greenpeace and the World Wildlife Fund have expressed concerns about the FDA's lack of a requirement for additional testing for GMO's, lack of required labeling and the presumption that GMO's are "generally recognized as safe" (GRAS). Some of these groups have questioned whether the FDA is too close to companies that seek approval for their products.

=== Health concerns ===
Although there have been no recorded instances of harm to human health due to the consumption of genetically engineered foods, there is concern over their impact on health. One of the largest food recalls in US history, was the Taco Bell GMO recall, where a Bt corn plant not approved for human consumption due its risk as an allergen, had contaminated food products like the tacos at Taco Bell, and a huge percentage of US's seed supply. No health problems were linked to Starlink corn, and subsequent evaluations of the Bt trait determined that there is medium risk to human health.

== Regulation ==
The USA is the largest commercial grower of genetically modified crops in the world. United States regulatory policy is governed by the Coordinated Framework for Regulation of Biotechnology. The United States is not a signatory to the Cartagena Protocol on Biosafety. For a genetically modified organism to be approved for release it is assessed by the USDA, the FDA and the EPA. USDA evaluates the plant's potential to become weeds, the FDA reviews plants that could enter or alter the food supply and the EPA regulates the genetically modified plants with pesticide properties. Most developed genetically modified plants are reviewed by at least two of the agencies, with many subject to all three. Final approval can still be denied by individual counties within each state. In 2004, Mendocino County, California became the first and only county to impose a ban on the "Propagation, Cultivation, Raising, and Growing of Genetically Modified Organisms", the measure passing with a 57% majority. (See Mendocino County GMO Ban)

=== U.S. Department of Agriculture ===
The Biotechnology Regulatory Services program of the Animal and Plant Health Inspection Service (APHIS) agency within the USDA is concerned with protecting agriculture and the environment from potential pests under the Plant Protection Act of 2000 (part of the Agriculture Risk Protection Act) and the National Environmental Policy Act (NEPA). Each transgenic event is regulated separately as the transgene insertion locus varies even when using identical constructs and host genotypes. This could result in different expression patterns or could affect the function of other endogenous genes within the host. The USDA is responsible for approving field trials of GM plants under either the notification or permit procedures. The notification procedure is a streamlined process for the simplest or most familiar genetically engineered plants that meet six criteria (is not a noxious weed, the function of the genetic material is known and characterized, stable integration, no significant risk of creating new viruses and that no animal or human pathogen sequences are present). Most field trials are approved under the notification procedure. The permit procedure is much more elaborate and is required for all genetically engineered organisms that do not meet the notification requirements or any plant-made pharmaceuticals or plant-made industrial products.

APHIS officials are responsible for inspecting the field trials. At least one inspection is carried out for each state listed on a permit, while inspection of field trials authorized by notification is conducted based on the relative risk of each trial. For field trials of organisms that contain pharmaceutical or industrial compounds, inspections are carried out more frequently (five times during establishment and twice yearly after that). If the inspectors are satisfied that there are no regulatory concerns they issue a Notice of Compliance. If the regulations are not being adhered to the inspectors will issue a Notice of Non-Compliance requesting that the deviations be fixed, or for more serious breaches a warning letter requiring a written response and corrective action to be taken within a given time frame. Formal investigations are carried out on developers who may not be adhering to regulations, permit conditions, or other requirements, which can result in civil penalties or criminal charges.

In 1993, the USDA proposal to remove regulatory oversight from GM organisms deemed environmentally benign was approved and four GM plants (Flavr Savr tomato, virus-resistant squash, bromoxynil-tolerant cotton and glyphosate-tolerant soybean) obtained non-regulatory status that year. Non-regulated status means that permits and notifications are no longer required for introductions of this organism. Applicants can petition APHIS for non-regulated status if the GM organism poses no more of a plant pest risk than an equivalent non-GM organism. APHIS will prepare at least two documents (an Environmental Assessment and a determination of non-regulatory status) under the NEPA while considering the application.

Four federal district court suits have been brought against APHIS challenging their regulation of GM plants. Two involved field trials (herbicide-tolerant turfgrass in Oregon; pharmaceutical-producing corn and sugar in Hawaii) and the other two were the deregulation of GM alfalfa and GM Sugar Beet. APHIS initially lost all four cases, with the judges ruling they failed to diligently follow the NEPA guidelines. However, the Supreme Court overturned the nationwide ban on GM alfalfa and an appeal court allowed the partial deregulation of GM sugar beet crops. After APHIS prepared Environmental Impact Statements for both crops they were deregulated again.

=== Food and Drug Administration ===
The FDA is responsible for the safety and security of human and animal food and drugs, including any that are genetically modified. The FDA was responsible for approving the first commercialized GMO, Genetech's genetically modified human insulin (Humulin) in 1982 and the first commercialized GM whole food, Calgene's Flavr Savr tomato in 1994. When evaluating new GM foods or feed the FDA looks for the presence of any new or altered allergens and toxicants and examines changes in the levels of nutritional and anti-nutritional substances. Food and feed that is identical or nearly identical in composition to current products is deemed to be substantially equivalent and is not required to undergo review by the FDA. The FDA has been criticized for using substantial equivalence, with a major accusation being that FDA review is essentially voluntary as almost all GM products are substantially equivalent. However, all GM food and feed currently on the US market (as of 2008) have undergone a FDA consultation, where the developer submits the compositional data and FDA scientist compare it to regular food and feed.

The FDA consultation focuses on whether the new food or feed contains any new allergens or toxic substances and whether the nutritional components of the food or feed have increased or decreased. The developer submits documentation to the FDA describing the food or feed and a FDA assigned caseworker can then request additional information on expected dietary exposure, in particular if any risk groups (children, elderly etc.) might be exposed. As of 2007, the FDA has not identified any genetically modified foods with unexpected changes in the nutrient composition or levels of allergens or toxic substances. However, allergic proteins have been detected when some GM products have undergone testing. Pioneer Hi-Bred inserted a gene from the Brazil nut into transgenic soybean resulting in soy with an enhanced nutritional profile. The inserted gene did not translate into a known allergen at the time, but when tested with serum from people who are allergic to Brazil nut the allergenic nature of the protein was discovered. The development of the transgenic soybean expressing a Brazil nut allergen was stopped after these tests. The FDA consultation process is relatively (when compared to the other agencies regulating GM) informal and they do not approve new GM products. Instead they issue a memo stating whether the new food is the same as or different from the non-modified variety.

The Center for Veterinary Medicine of the FDA regulates genetically modified animals in consultation with Centers at the FDA responsible for regulating pharmaceuticals or other medical products derived from biopharm animals. The FDA also has extra guidelines that apply to genetically modified animals that will be used in the manufacturing and testing of therapeutic products and xenotransplantation. The FDA guidance documents do not establish legally binding laws and are viewed as recommendations, unless specific regulatory or statutory requirements are cited. Any relevant federal, State, or local laws and regulations must also be adhered to.

=== Environmental Protection Agency ===
The EPA regulates substances with pesticide characteristics, looking at potential threats to human health or the environment. They claim not to regulate the genetically modified plants, but the pesticides produced by the plants or properties that change the usage of applied pesticides. This includes; plants engineered to produce resistance to herbicides (e.g. Roundup Ready), plants that produce their own pesticides (e.g. BT) and virus resistant plants. Authority to regulate the pesticide properties in genetically modified organisms was granted in the Federal Insecticide, Fungicide, and Rodenticide Act (FIFRA) and the Federal Food, Drug, and Cosmetic Act (FFDCA). The EPA published regulations in 1994 and begun acting on them in 1995. In 1994 they proposed the exemption of three categories of genetically modified plants under their regulation. These were plants where the genetic material originated in sexually compatible plants (cisgenic), plants that used physical barriers to prevent the target pest from attaching itself, and plants expressing viral coat proteins to protect against virus infection. In 2001, rules regarding exemption of cisgenic plants had been finalised. The other two proposed exemptions were still under review in 2010.

The EPA evaluated each submission on a case-by-case basis. The EPA assesses data concerning the characterisation of the end-product of the engineered organism (presently all plants evaluated produce proteins), as well as data on mammalian toxicity, effects on non-target organisms and environmental metabolism. For Bt products the producer must also supply an insect resistance management program. For herbicide resistant plants the EPA co-ordinates with the USDA and FDA, but does not regulate the plant itself. Instead it regulates the herbicide and its use on the new cultivar. The EPA examines the construct used to transform the plant and the biology of recipient plant. The sequence of the resulting protein must be described, expression pattern and intensity verified and any modifications to the protein reported. The EPA considers the potential allergenicity of the product, issues surrounding gene flow into wild species, possible effects on non-target organisms, likelihood of it persisting in the environment and the potential for insect resistance developing when assessing submissions.

== See also ==
- Agriculture in the United States
- Environmental issues in the United States
- Genetic engineering in Hawaii
