= Mycogen =

Mycogen may refer to:

- Mycogen (Foundation universe), a fictional entity
- Mycogen Seeds, an American provider of seeds for agriculture
