= Mendocino County GMO Ban =

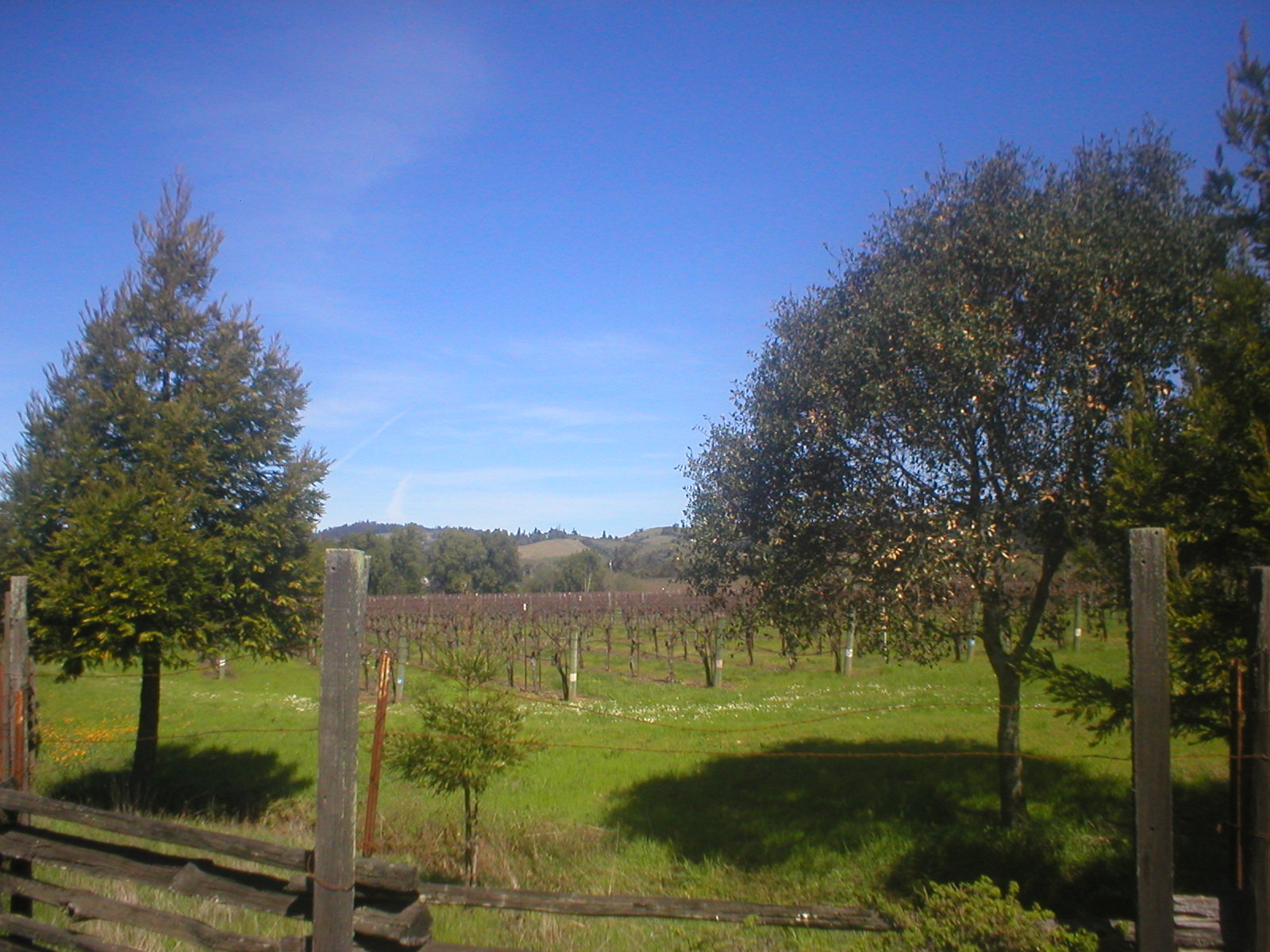
A Mendocino County winery

Mendocino County, California, was the first jurisdiction in the United States to ban the cultivation, production or distribution of genetically modified organisms (GMOs). The ordinance, entitled Measure H, was passed by referendum on March 2, 2004. Initiated by the group "GMO Free Mendocino", the campaign was a highly publicized grassroots effort by local farmers and environmental groups who contend that the potential risks of GMOs to human health and the ecosystem have not yet been fully understood. The measure was met with opposition by several interest groups representing the biotechnology industry, The California Plant Health Association (now the Western Plant Health Association) and CropLife America, a Washington-based consortium whose clients represent some of the largest food distributors in the nation, including Monsanto, DuPont and Dow Chemical. Since the enactment of the ordinance, Mendocino County has been added to an international list of "GMO free zones." Pre-emptive statutes banning local municipalities from such ordinances have now become widespread with adoption in sixteen states.

== Background ==
GMOs are commonly considered to be any organism whose DNA has been modified by human intervention. Agricultural practices, however, have long used selective breeding techniques for the same purpose as modern biotechnology. Researchers now define genetically engineered organisms (GEOs) as those that are produced from a range of recombinant DNA technologies, which introduce a transgene into the genome of a host cell. The most widely practiced method involves the use of bacteria, which are able to penetrate the cell membrane of the host. Other methods include a "gene gun" or "biolistic particle delivery system". Recombinant DNA technology allows for the creation of synthetic genes with specific traits that have anthropogenic benefits. The term GEOs will be used here to describe organisms produced by the recombinant DNA technology commonly referred to by usage of the term GMOs.

== Environmental concerns ==
The geographic and temporal scope of the regulatory debate regarding transgenic organisms and recombinant DNA technology is vast. Environmental risk assessments must weigh unquantifiable long-term risks against high and quantifiable short-term benefits. There is widespread concern amongst environmental groups, organic farmers and the international community that the introduction of transgenic organisms into local ecosystems may cause irreversible loss of biodiversity when the new synthetic strains become predominant. Further concern comes from members of the medical community who warn of the risk that the antibiotics used in the production of many GEOs may give rise to more resistant strains of bacteria. While the scientific community generally acknowledges the possibility of these risks, the scenarios are hard to quantify, particularly in a Risk-Cost Benefit Analysis (RCBA) model commonly used in public policy.

Proponents of the technology dispute many of these findings or the significance of the risk factors. They generally contend that the GE strains have no further evolutionary advantage than any other new strain introduced into a local ecosystem and that they behave in the same way. They also cite less need for pesticides than conventional non-organic crops. Opponents, by contrast, adhere to the precautionary principle, which advocates waiting until further study is done and puts the burden of proof on the producer to prove that their productive activities are no threat to the environment or human health before continuing. The precautionary principle has become the foundation of environmental policy for the EU.

== Causes ==
The promulgation of agricultural biotechnology follows a trajectory that began in what is commonly referred to as the "green revolution". In the twentieth century, industrial methods were increasingly applied to agriculture for the mass production of monocultures, large tracts of land used for the production of single high yield crops with the use of fertilizers and pesticides. The actual physical problem GEOs seek to address, most commonly, is the destruction of crops from pests. The gradual shift towards monoculture has increased the frequency and severity of pest invasion and infestation because of the lack of agricultural diversity. Many pests that threaten different crops are natural predators to each other, which helps to offset their impacts. When many miles of the same crop are planted, however, it leaves the local habitat more vulnerable to the threat of single pest.

GEOs have brought short-term benefits in the control of pests by having genetically programmed immunities to the pesticides that are produced to be used along with them, such as the well-known post-emergence herbicide Roundup produced by Monsanto. The primary forces that are driving the production of GEOs, however, are social and economic. GEOs are the latest development in the drive to produce higher yields with less inputs, according to the profit maximization model. Proponents of the technology see it as an answer to growing food shortages in the face of rising global population. They also cite potential benefits, such as the creation of more healthy strains of produce, aquaculture or livestock, with higher nutrient content and less fat. Opponents of GEOs, however, argue that world hunger is caused by economic and political dynamics rather than scarcity so regardless of whether the yield is increased, the produce will not to flow through the supply chain to those in need.

== Policy ==
According to the ordinance, it is "unlawful for any person, firm, or corporation to propagate, cultivate, raise, or grow genetically modified organisms in Mendocino County." The measure is careful to define transgenic-organisms as dependent on biotechnology as opposed to traditional methods of selective breeding. It also excludes micro-organisms from the prohibition. The complex geographic and spatial dimensions of the issue are highlighted by the fact that the ordinance only affects unincorporated areas of the county. City, state, federal and tribal lands are exempt from the prohibition and are free to grow and distribute GEOs.

Measure H uses the traditional regulatory approach as its only policy tool. The policy targets are producers or distributors of genetically engineered organisms. Ostensibly, the farming industry is the stakeholder primarily targeted, though the law affects any person or entity. Due to the recognized inability to limit all GEO propagation within geographical proximity to the unincorporated areas affected by the law, the policy goals are rather to limit the expansion of the biotechnology industry in the county and to make it harder for seed companies to sell GE seed to local farmers. According to Andrew Kimbrall of the Center for Food Safety, who backed the measure stated that local municipalities have "no alternative but to try to halt" the spread of GE crops. In this context, the purpose is not to completely eradicate any GEOs in the county but rather to counteract the prevailing trend of the agricultural industry.

== History ==
The "GMO Free Mendocino" campaign was started by Els Cooperrider, a retired cancer researcher and founding member of "The Mendocino Organic Network." Initially, the coalition sought to enact local legislation requiring the labeling of GEO products. However, since national efforts to push for labeling had been largely unsuccessful it was decided to advocate the prohibition of GEO production and propagation within county limits instead.

Janie Sheppard, a local attorney and Dr. Ron Epstein, a research professor, were signed proponents on Measure H, alongside Cooperrider.

More money was spent on Measure H than any other ballot in Mendocino County’s history. In total, "No on H" supporters spent over $700,000, with $600,000 of it coming from Croplife America. The "Yes on H" coalition raised $135,000 by the end of the campaign. The measure passed by 57% of the vote and was portrayed in the media as a "David vs. Goliath" battle between a small grassroots coalition of community activists and a deep pocketed special interest group in Washington.

== Stakeholders ==
Mendocino County’s measure H highlights a localized battle of stakeholders over a contentious public policy debate that is international in scope. The organic farming industry is the fastest growing sector of the US agricultural market. It accounts for approximately one third of Mendocino’s agriculture, the majority of which consists of wineries. The organic farming industry in California has been the most organized lobby against GMOs due to concerns about cross-pollination. Patented strains of "Roundup Ready" seed, which are resistant to the pesticide "Roundup" produced by Monsanto, have been found to disperse onto neighboring farms, creating legal battles over proprietary rights such as the famous test case in the Canadian Supreme Court, Monsanto Canada Inc. v. Schmeiser.

With a growing demand for organic products in European and Japanese markets, the prospect of cross-pollination is perceived as a significant economic threat to the organic industry. Mendocino’s wine industry was especially concerned about losing Japanese markets and have since used the ordinance as a marketing tool. The United States Department of Agriculture (USDA) has assured organic farmers that they will not lose their certification if contamination occurs. This has not erased the perception that the integrity of their industry and the ecosystems that they are dependent upon are at risk by the gradual introduction of GEOs.

Measure H’s passing was considered a victory for environmental groups and the local organic farming industry and brought Mendocino international attention. Sharp criticism, however, came from industry insiders who have accepted widespread adoption of GEOs. According to rancher and Mendocino County Farm Bureau Director Peter Bradford, the measure was motivated by "a fear of science and big corporations" Nationwide, 90% of the soybean, 73% of corn and 87% of cotton produced in the US come from genetically engineered seed. The largest financial sector of the industry views biotechnology as the natural progression of trade techniques, which have passed adequate safety standards. The Food and Drug Administration (FDA) and USDA have so far agreed. The FDA drafted new guidelines in 1991 stating that GEOs and non-GEOs were "substantially equivalent."

County	Yes	No	GEOs Prohibited
Mendocino	57%	43%	Yes
Marin	61%	39%	Yes
Butte	39%	61%	No
Humboldt	35%	65%	No
San Luis Obispo	41%	58%	No
Sonoma	44%	56%	No

Board of Supervisors

	Yes	No	GEOs Prohibited
Trinity	3	2	Yes
Santa Cruz	5	0	Yes

Table-1

The trend towards federal deregulation of GEOs leaves local municipalities facing a much tougher challenge in prohibiting them. Jurisdictional issues bring into question the legal standing of county ordinances regulating GEOs. Federal pre-emption statutes may override them if challenged. GE crops are regulated by the EPA under the pesticide guidelines in FIFRA (Federal Insecticide, Fungicide and Rodenticide Act) according to which "…a state shall not impose any requirements for labeling or packaging in addition to or different from those under" FIFRA. Some legal experts contend that any regulation of GEOs must take place at the federal level because of this statute.

Since the passage of measure H, counties in California followed Mendocino’s example with eight similar initiatives making it to the ballots. Of the eight counties that voted on anti-GEO initiatives, four passed and four were defeated. In addition, eleven counties passed pro-GEO ordinances banning their prohibition. Table-1 lists the counties and their voting percentages.

In 2005, state senator Dean Florez attempted to pass a state preemptive bill prohibiting counties from banning GEOs. The bill passed in the assembly but got stalled in the senate where it had previously passed. California remains a challenging regulatory environment for GE producers and the farmers who wish to use their seed. The Federal District Court of Northern California has undergone a protracted regulatory battle with the USDA regarding two crops in particular, GE Alfalfa and GE Sugar Beets. In 2005, the USDA had deregulated Roundup Ready Alfalfa (RRA). Two years later, in response to a lawsuit filed by Earthjustice and the Center for Food Safety, the district court ruled that the deregulation was in violation of the National Environmental Policy Act (NEPA) because an environmental impact statement (EIS) had not been done. In Geertson Farms Inc., et al. v. Mike Johanns, et al., Judge Charles R. Breyer imposed an injunction on planting any further seed.

In June 2010, the Supreme Court overturned the injunction, stating that it was unnecessary because the USDA’s deregulation was, in fact, in violation of NEPA and thus there was no legal standing to plant the seed in the first place obviating the need for an injunction. It was ordered that an EIS be done, which was projected to be complete in 2012. Another injunction was ordered by Judge Jeffrey White against the planting of GE sugar beets in August 2010. When it was discovered that GE sugar beets had been planted in September, in violation of the injunction, Judge White ordered the destruction of the crops. It was the first time that GEO crops were ever ordered to be destroyed by a US court. Farmers in the sugar beet industry reported that there was not enough non-GE seed left. The government warned that the US was faced with a potential 20% reduction in sugar production. On February 4, 2011, at the request of Monsanto and a German seed company named KWS, the USDA proceeded with a "partial deregulation" that will allow planting to continue until the EIS is complete and a final ruling is made.

Local environmental activists were dismayed by this decision and took it as a defeat. The partial deregulation requires farmers of GE seed to take measures to prevent cross-pollination. They are not allowed to plant within three miles of non-GE crops, for instance, and they are subject to government inspections. Opponents of the decision contend that these protections will be inadequate. The ruling came the day after a consortium of the nation's largest organic food distributors including Whole Foods, Organic Valley and Stonyfield Farm, agreed to no longer oppose the propagation of RRA and GE crops in general.

== Evaluation ==
As yet, there is little available data on the outcome of the measure. It has remained on the books and has continued to be enforced within its jurisdictional boundaries. Appropriate measures of evaluation stem from the measure’s stated goals "The people of Mendocino County wish to protect the county’s agriculture, environment, economy, and private property from genetic pollution by genetically modified organisms." This policy goal lacks definition of the term "genetic pollution". Taken at face value, from an empirical standpoint, it could be seen as having failed in that GEOs certainly have migrated across jurisdictional boundaries. Many commercial food products contain GEOs, which residents of the county have been buying unknowingly since there are still no federal laws requiring their labeling. GE corn products, in particular, have become ubiquitous as additives in food processing. Furthermore, since the term "genetic pollution" is left undefined, even if cross-pollination has occurred, whether nor not it is considered pollution will vary according to the stakeholder.

In the broader sense of the policy’s purpose as a political tool to impede the advancement of the biotechnology industry and the spread of "GE crops" generally, the ensuing nationwide regulatory debate over jurisdictional issues with similar county prohibitions could be seen as a success. Mendocino is now cited internationally as a center of the organic movement and a catalyst for anti-GEO movements that have, in some cases impeded their growth, particularly in California where GE crops have actually been ordered to be destroyed by a federal judge.

== Civic agriculture ==
Mendocino is famous for being a bastion of rural counter-culture where many liberal activists and members of California’s hippie generation led a back-to-the-land movement during the 1970s. The Measure H campaign reaffirmed these sensibilities and has been studied as an example of "civic agriculture." The agenda-setting phase of the policy cycle was highly localized. Public policy experts and social historians contend that the implications of the "GMO free Mendocino" movement were beyond the empirical basis of the ordinance or the larger political debate regarding GEOs.

The social forces animating the conflict were embedded in localized rural values of stewardship and decentralization. The community’s self conception as a synthesis of its counter-cultural legacy and rural working class ethos fostered a powerful sense of local collective action that was pitted against the perception of top down "command and control" of local agriculture by a distant monolithic nexus of multinational power.

== See also ==
- Genetic engineering in the United States
