= Granular Inc. =

American agricultural software company

- Company type: Private
- Industry: Agriculture
- Predecessor: Solum
- Founded: 2014; 12 years ago
- Founders: Sid Gorham, Mike Preiner
- Headquarters: San Francisco, United States
- Key people: Rajan Gajaria
- Products: Software for agriculture
- Parent: Corteva Agriscience
- Website: www.granular.ag

Granular is an American agricultural software development company based in San Francisco. The company's software systems help farmers to be more profitable and efficient. The company's software products provide farmers tools to manage their financial performance and manage agronomic inputs for maximum performance and return.

In addition to digital tools for farmers, Granular also owns AgStudio, a precision ag software company used primarily by ag retailers and professional agronomists, as well as AcreValue, a website that uses proprietary algorithms to provide estimated land values.

== History ==
Granular is a spinoff of the company Solum, which was founded in 2009. In 2014, Monsanto acquired half of the business, which focused on soil testing and was merged with Climate Corp. The remaining half of the company was spun-off into Granular. After the split, Granular raised $4.2 million in Series A round funding from Andreessen Horowitz, Khosla Ventures and Google Ventures. In April 2015, Granular acquired the farmland valuation platform, AcreValue, for an undisclosed amount.

In July 2015, the company raised an additional $18.7 million in a Series B round of funding led by Tao Capital, with additional funding from previous backers. The company opened a regional headquarters at the University of Illinois Research Park in Champaign, Illinois, in November 2015. In September 2017, Granular was acquired by DowDuPont, which became Corteva on June 6, 2019. CEO and Founder Sid Gorham was named director of digital solutions for Corteva and also maintains his title as Granular CEO. The company operates as an independent, wholly owned subsidiary of Corteva, and maintains offices in Johnston, Iowa, and Cumming, Georgia, as well as their Illinois and San Francisco offices.

== Operations ==
Granular Business software allows farmers to track the profitability of their farms. The platform tracks input and crop inventories, and integrates with data collected from a wide range of farming equipment. The company's smartphone application allows workers to access work orders, schedules and other information in the field.

Through the 2015 acquisition of AcreValue, Granular allows users the ability to track and compare farmland values. The platform compiles public data sources and other factors, including soil, climate, geography and crop history to provide users with a custom land value report. In early 2019, AcreValue partnered with Land Brokers Institute to list new farmland listings on the site across all 48 contiguous U.S. states. As part of their agreement with DowDuPont, Granular assumed control of DowDuPont's digital agronomic software offering called Encirca, which provides farmers recommendations on variable rate seeding, fertility and nitrogen. Encirca field service agents also consult with growers throughout the growing season. MapShots AgStudio, a precision ag software primarily used by ag retailers and agronomists, also became part of Granular in 2017 as part of the company's acquisition by DowDuPont.
