= Ron Epstein =

American scholar and translator

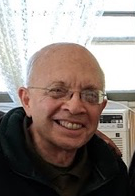
- Born: December 15, 1942 (age 83)

Academic background
- Education: Harvard University, University of Washington, UC Berkeley

Academic work
- Discipline: Buddhist Studies, Religious Studies, Philosophy
- Institutions: San Francisco State University (emeritus), Dharma Realm Buddhist University

Ronald B. Epstein (born December 15, 1942) is an American scholar and translator, specializing in Mahayana Buddhism. He is also a Buddhist practitioner and community activist.

== Education ==
Epstein graduated from Harvard University in 1965. He received his Masters in Chinese Language and Literature at the University of Washington in 1969 and his PhD in Buddhist Studies at UC Berkeley in 1975.

In 1966, Epstein began studying Buddhism under the late Hsuan Hua.

== Career ==
Epstein was a lecturer in the philosophy department at San Francisco State University from 1971 to 2003. He was a founding member of Dharma Realm Buddhist University (DRBU) and taught there from 1977 to 2011. He currently serves on the Board of Trustees at DRBU.

He has helped to translate several Buddhist sutras, including the Surangama Sutra, and has published other books on Buddhism.

Epstein was one of the signed proponents for Measure H, an ordinance that bans the cultivation, production or distribution of genetically modified organisms (GMOs). When it passed in 2004, Mendocino County became the first county in the US to ban GMOs. Epstein has published articles on the dangers of GMOs since the 90s. In 2018, he published a book “Responsible Living: Explorations in Applied Buddhist Ethics - Animals, Environment, GMOs, Digital Media”, which uses Buddhist principles to examine the issues of our contemporary life.

== Selected works ==
- 2018: Responsible Living: Explorations in Applied Buddhist Ethics - Animals, Environment, GMOs, Digital Media. Buddhist Text Translation Society.
- 2012: The Surangama Sutra. A New Translation with Excerpts from the Commentary by the Venerable Master Hsuan Hua. Coeditor. Buddhist Text Translation Society.
- 2003: Buddhism A to Z. Compiler. Buddhist Text Translation Society.
- 1980: The Heart of Prajna Paramita Sutra. Translator. Buddhist Text Translation Society.
- 1974: The Amitabha Sutra. Translator. Buddhist Text Translation Society.

== Online Publications ==
A list of online publications by Epstein can be found here: http://online.sfsu.edu/rone/OnlinePublications.htm
