= Hawaiian Host Group =

American manufacturing company

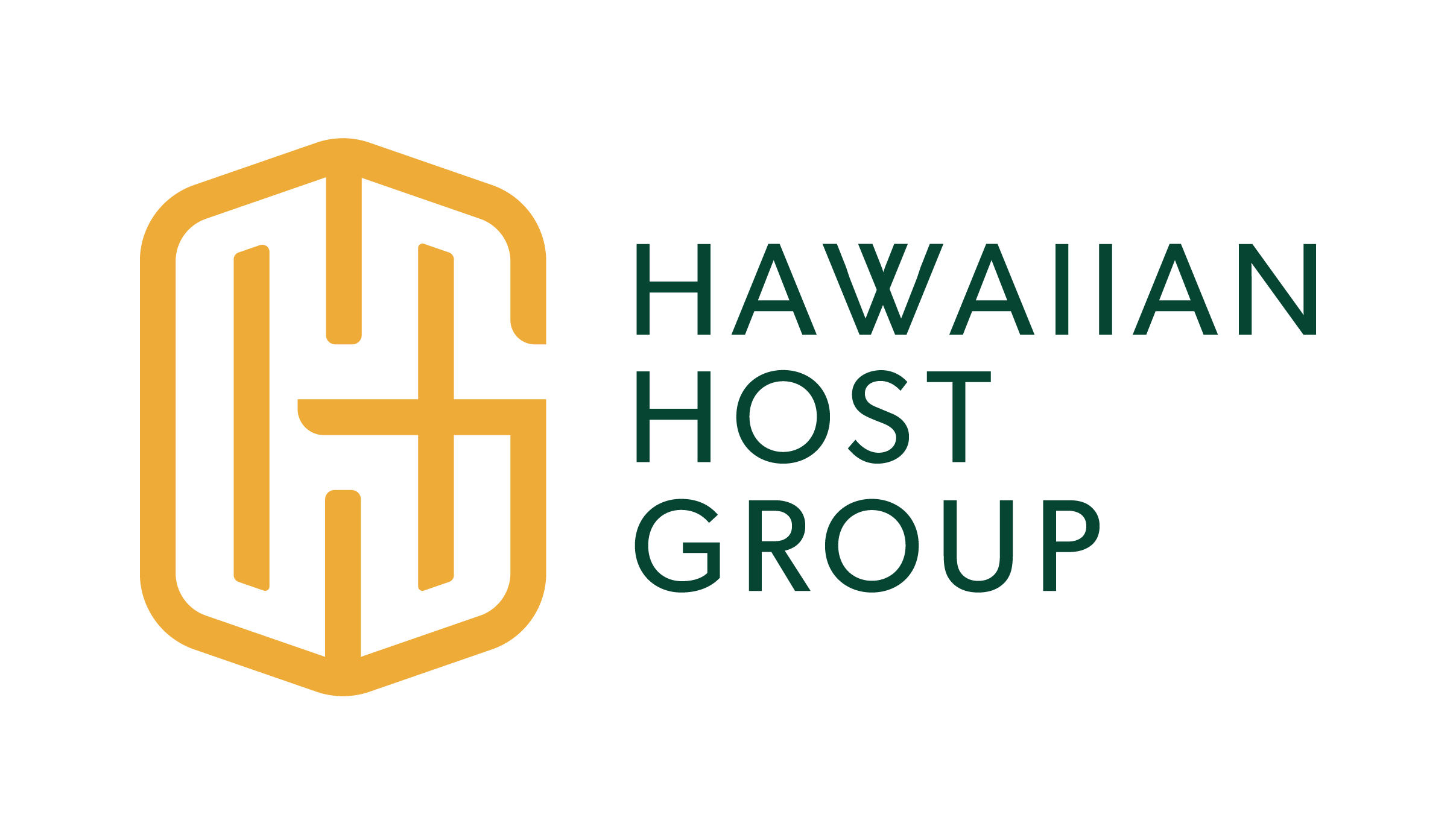
- Industry: Agriculture Manufacturing and Consumer Goods
- Founded: 1927; 99 years ago in Honolulu, Hawai‘i
- Founder: Mamoru Takitani and Aiko Takitani
- Headquarters: Honolulu, Hawai‘i, United States
- Key people: Ed Schultz (President & CEO)
- Products: Macadamia products
- Website: www.hawaiianhostgroup.com

Hawaiian Host Group (HHG) is a Hawai‘i-based consumer goods and agricultural manufacturing company. It is the largest branded macadamia nut company in the world, with a portfolio of brands that includes Hawaiian Host, Mauna Loa, MacFarms, KOHO, and Kapua Orchards. Sold in over 23 countries, HHG produces a suite of products ranging from flavored macadamia nuts to artisan chocolates, and macadamia milk-based ice cream. Its 500 employees are spread across the HHG headquarters in Honolulu and offices in Hilo, Kona, Los Angeles, and Tokyo. HHG has manufacturing plants in Honolulu and Kea‘au, as well as Hawai‘i's single largest macadamia farm, south of Kona.

== History ==
In 1927, local candymaker, John Dye, and his wife, Georgina Dias, opened Ellen Dye Candies in downtown Honolulu. They began experimenting with chocolate and locally grown macadamia nuts and became the first manufacturer of chocolate-dipped macadamias. In Wailuku, Maui, Mamoru Takitani was crafting his own version of chocolate-covered macadamias with a secret recipe in his parents’ attic.

On January 1, 1960, Mamoru Takitani and his wife, Aiko Takitani, moved to Honolulu and acquired Ellen Dye Candies. They renamed the company to Hawaiian Host.

Mamoru and Aiko went to work on improving the world’s first chocolate-covered macadamias. They began spreading the word through door-to-door sales, meetings with potential wholesalers, and even selling the chocolate out of the back of Aiko’s station wagon. The business quickly gained momentum in the local retail and restaurant industries, and later expanded its reach to the Mainland US, Japan, Singapore, and beyond.

In 2002, Hawaiian Host introduced its tagline: “Genuine, Classic, Original. Since 1927.”

In 2015, Hawaiian Host acquired Mauna Loa Macadamia Nuts, one of the largest processors of macadamias in the world. Mauna Loa was formerly owned by The Hershey Company from 2004-2015. The headquarters and main processing plant are located in Keaau, Hawaii.

In 2020, the Hawaiian Host Group brand officially launched as the parent company of its consumer brands: Hawaiian Host and Mauna Loa.

In 2021, Hawaiian Host Group launched a new, luxury artisanal chocolate brand called, KOHO, which specializes in island-inspired bon bons.

In 2023, Hawaiian Host Group acquired MacFarms and Kapua Orchards. Kapua Orchards is one of the largest macadamia orchards in the world with 4,000 acres of macadamia trees south of Kona on Hawai‘i Island.

== Consumer Brands ==
=== Hawaiian Host ===
Hawaiian Host’s history traces back to 1927 when John Dye opened Ellen Dye Candies in Downtown Honolulu, specializing in chocolate-dipped macadamia nuts. On January 1, 1960, Mamoru and Aiko Takitani purchased Ellen Dye Candies and renamed it to Hawaiian Host. In 2018, Hawaiian Host became the world’s largest manufacturer of chocolate-covered macadamias. Each year, Hawaiian Host produces 250 million chocolate covered macadamias and sells its products in over 23 countries.

=== Mauna Loa ===
Hawaiian Host Group acquired Mauna Loa in 2015 from The Hershey Company. Previously, Mauna Loa was owned by The Hershey Company (2004-2015), Shansby Group (2000-2004), and C. Brewer & Co. (1974-2000). Mauna Loa specializes in dry-roasted, chocolate-covered, flavored macadamias, and macadamia milk-based ice cream. Its headquarters and processing plant are located in Kea‘au, Hawai‘i.

In 2021, Mauna Loa won the NOSH Best Packaging Award. In 2022, Mauna Loa installed a 1.2 MW solar farm (2,916 panels) and 500 kW battery storage system onsite to help power the facility. The Mauna Loa Visitor Center was renovated in 2022 after being closed due to the COVID-19 pandemic.

=== MacFarms ===
In 2023, Hawaiian Host Group acquired MacFarms LLC through a stock purchase from Australia-based Health and Plant Protein Group LTD, bringing the stewardship of MacFarms and Kapua Orchards to Hawai‘i. MacFarms specializes in dry-roasted and chocolate-covered macadamias, sold exclusively in club stores.

=== KOHO ===
KOHO was launched in 2021 as HHG’s luxury brand, specializing in Island-inspired artisanal chocolates and bon bons. KOHO launched its first pop-up store at Ala Moana Center in November 2021. In December 2022, KOHO launched its flagship boutique at the Outrigger Waikiki, in Honolulu, Hawai‘i. In 2023, KOHO was voted Best Luxury Chocolates Made in Hawaii by the Honolulu Magazine in their Best of Honolulu 2023 awards.

=== Kapua Orchards ===
Kapua Orchards is one of the largest macadamia orchards in the world. The orchard’s 240,000 trees are spread across 4,000 acres of land, south of Kona on Hawai‘i Island. At Kapua Orchards, macadamias are hand-picked and cracked onsite.

== Corporate Social Responsibility ==
Hawaiian Host Group’s purpose is to make the Islands’ future flourish. The company seeks to fulfill its purpose through a variety of ways.

=== Mamoru and Aiko Takitani Foundation, Inc. ===
After achieving worldwide success with Hawaiian Host chocolates, Mamoru and Aiko Takitani established the Mamoru and Aiko Takitani Foundation to provide the gift of education to the young people of Hawaiʻi. Since 1993, the Takitani Foundation has annually presented scholarships to an outstanding student from every qualifying high school in the State of Hawaiʻi. Scholarships and grants distributed by the Takitani Foundation since its inception total over $12.5 million, of which Hawaiian Host Group has donated over $2 million.

=== Community Donations - Hawai‘i’s Most Charitable Organizations (2022) ===
Hawaiian Host Group gives back to the local Hawai‘i community with impactful donations. In 2022, Hawaiian Host Group donated +$180,000 worth of in-kind product donations and sponsorships to over 88 local organizations and events that help engage, educate, develop, and uplift the community. Hawaiian Host Group was named one of “Hawai‘i’s Most Charitable Organizations” by Hawai‘i Business Magazine in 2022 and 2023.

A few organizations that Hawaiian Host Group consistently partners with include: Merrie Monarch Festival Foundation, University of Hawaii at Manoa and Shidler College of Business, Hawaii Foodbank, Make-A-Wish Hawaii, Aloha United Way, Mana Up, Honolulu Little League, and many others across the state.

=== Mana Up Partnership ===
Through a partnership with Mana Up, a Hawai‘i-based business accelerator, Hawaiian Host Group offers executive mentorship to up-and-coming local business owners. Hawaiian Host Group provides over 20 of Mana Up’s Big Island entrepreneurs with access to a global audience through a permanent “store within a store” in its Mauna Loa Visitor Center near Hilo.

=== Solar Farm ===
In 2022, Hawaiian Host Group partnered with DSD Renewables to install a 1.2 MW solar farm and 500 kW battery storage system onsite at its Mauna Loa facility in Kea‘au, Hawai‘i. The solar farm has the capacity to directly power 85% of Mauna Loa’s processing plant with solar energy. The addition complements existing clean energy sources at the facility, which can now be powered by 100% renewables.

As the largest operating photovoltaic power station project dedicated to a private company in Hawai‘i, the system is expected to generate 1.55 million kWh of solar energy annually, avoiding over 1,000 tons of carbon dioxide equivalent each year. The solar installation, completed in partnership with No Ka Oi Energy, includes 2,916 solar panels laid out across three acres on Mauna Loa’s grounds.
