= Mauna Loa Macadamia Nut Corporation =

World's largest processor of macadamia seeds

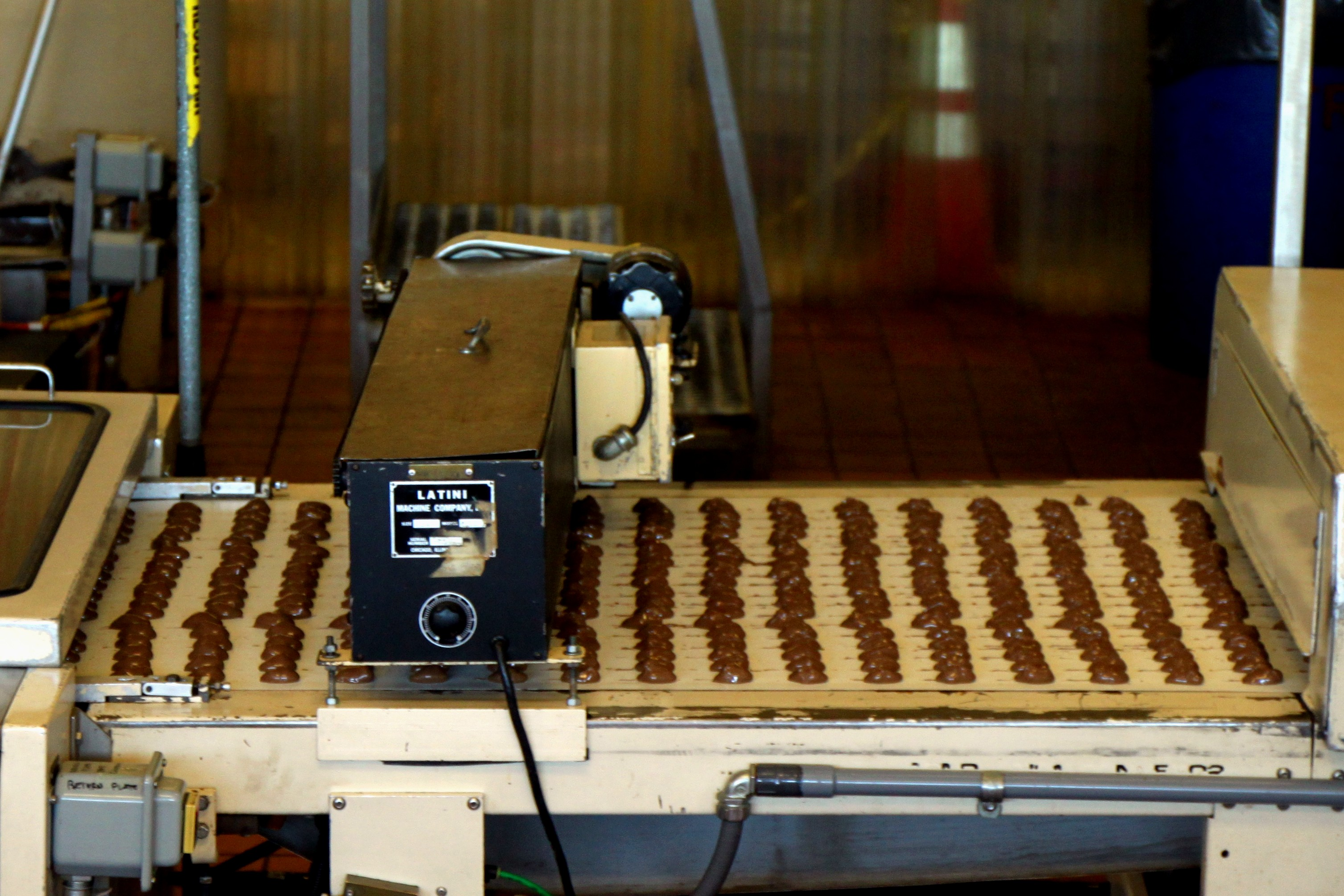
Mauna Loa Macadamia Nut & Chocolate Factory

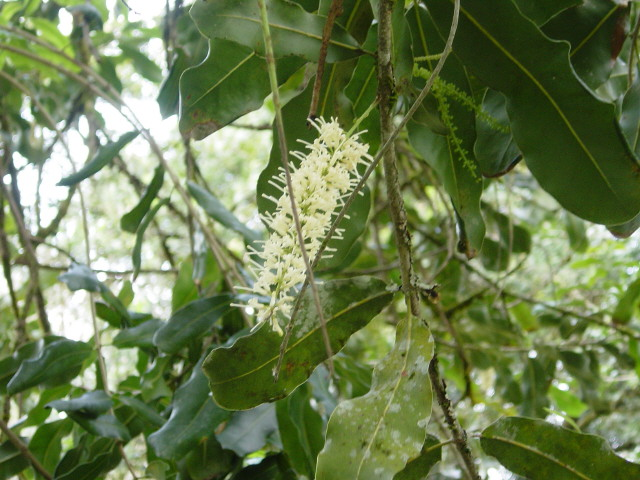
Blossoms of a macadamia nut tree at Mauna Loa Macadamia nut plantation near Hilo, Hawaii on the Big Island of Hawaii

Mauna Loa Macadamia Nut Corporation is the world's largest processor of macadamia seeds. The American company was a subsidiary of The Hershey Company from 2004 to 2015, when it was acquired by Hawaiian Host, Inc. The company takes its name from the volcano Mauna Loa. Their headquarters and main processing plant are near the mountain, south of Hilo in the Puna District of the island of Hawaiʻi, known as the Big Island.

== History ==
The first Mauna Loa macadamia plantation was planted in 1946, and the first commercial crop was harvested in 1956. The company was owned by Big Five company C. Brewer & Co. from 1974 to 2000.

The visitors center is a tourist attraction with its self-guided tour of the processing plant (viewed from the outside on a second-floor walkway due to safety and sanitation concerns) and large gift shop with homemade macadamia ice cream for sale and free samples of every flavor variation sold by the company. It is located at the address One Macadamia Road, near the town of Keaʻau, Hawaii at 19°39′24″N 155°0′33″W.

== Sustainability ==
The company promotes sustainable green causes, and is slowly working to become totally carbon neutral by reducing its dependence on conventionally generated electricity - particularly those involving coal and crude oil. At the main production facility, the company owns its own steam generator, which uses plant waste to generate electricity used in the harvesting and packaging of its macadamia seeds.
