= Pioneer Hi Bred International =

American producer of hybrid seeds for agriculture

Pioneer Hi-Bred International, Inc.
- Type: Agriculture/subsidiary
- Industry: Agriculture
- Founded: April 20, 1926; 100 years ago in Des Moines, Iowa
- Headquarters: Johnston, Iowa, U.S.
- Area served: Worldwide
- Key people: Chuck Magro (CEO of Corteva Agriscience)
- Products: Hybrid and varietal seeds
- Services: Granular Inc.
- Revenue: US$4.3 billion (2012)
- Number of employees: 12,300 (estimate)
- Parent: Corteva
- Website: www.pioneer.com

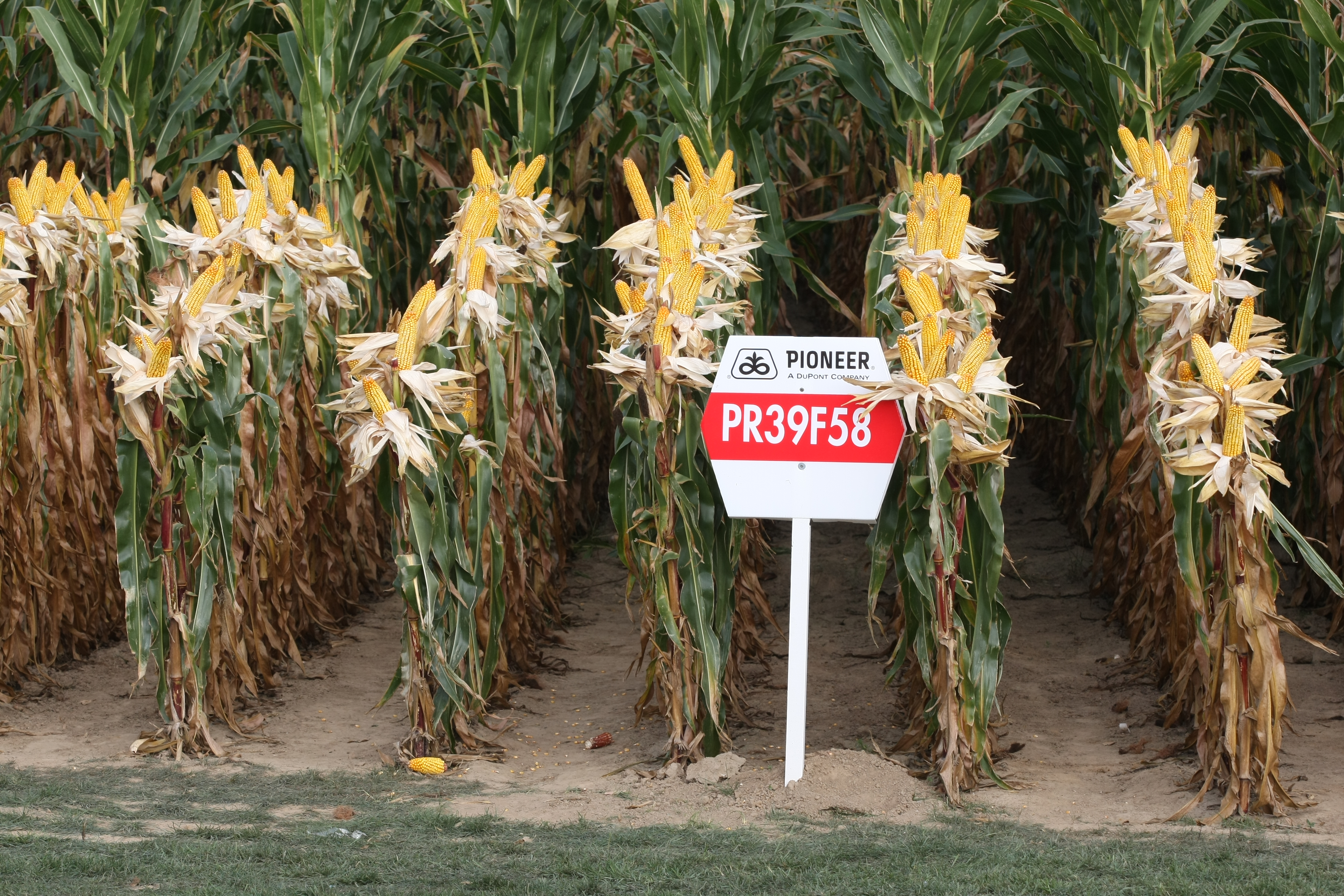
Presentation of Pioneer's "PR39F58" maize at Werktuigendagen, Belgium 2009

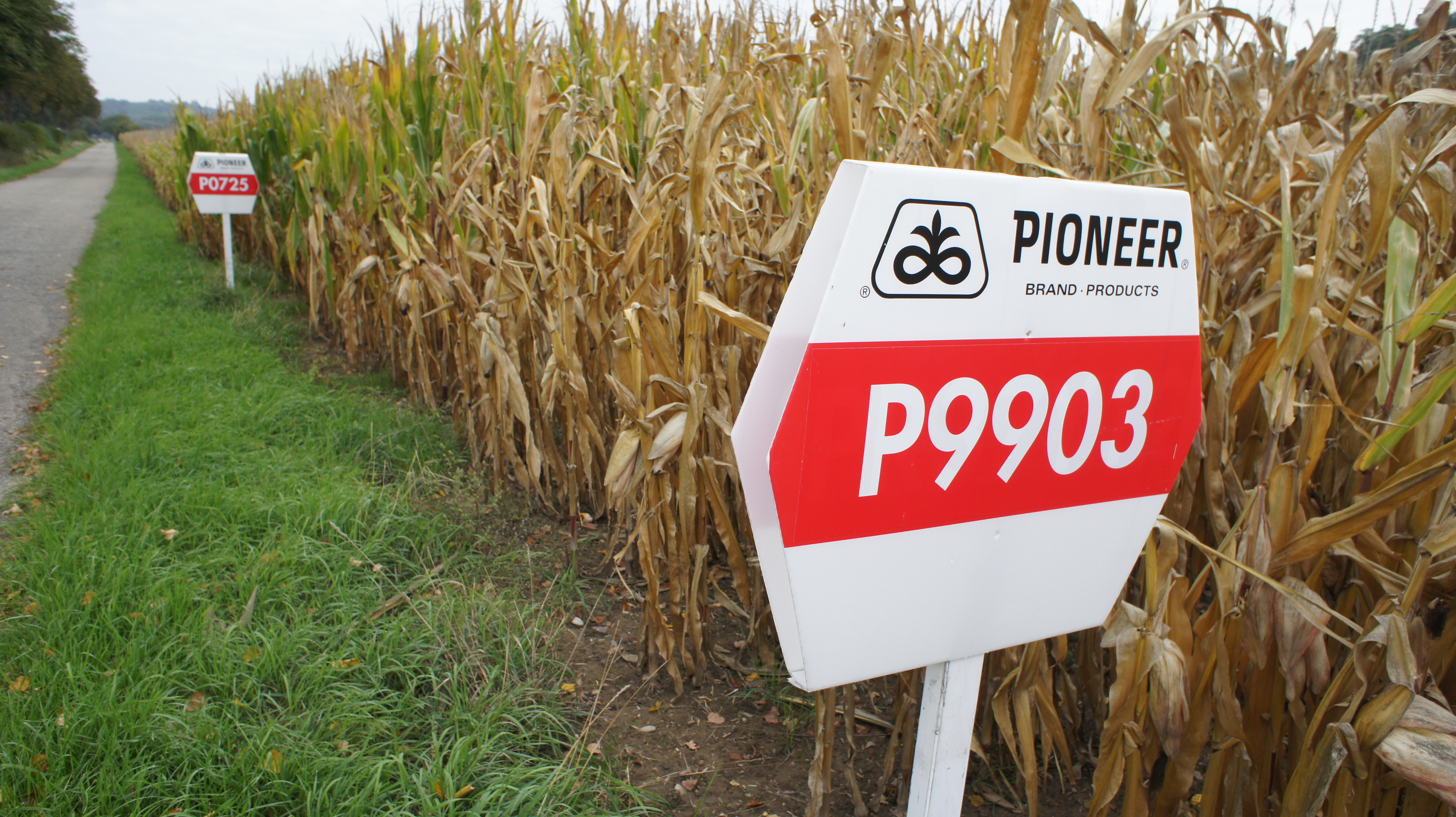
Presentation of Pioneer's corn seeds near Lahr in Germany

Pioneer Hi-Bred International, Inc., a subsidiary of Corteva, is a U.S.-based producer of seeds for agriculture. It is a major producer of genetically modified crops with insect and herbicide resistance.

The headquarters of Pioneer are in Johnston, Iowa, with additional offices around the world. Pioneer produces, markets and sells hybrid seed corn in nearly 70 countries worldwide. The company also markets and sells hybrids or improved varieties of sorghum, sunflower, soybean, alfalfa, canola, rice and wheat, as well as forage and grain additives. Worldwide, Pioneer sells products through a variety of organizations, including wholly owned subsidiaries (Curry Seed, NuTech Seed, Hoegemeyer Hybrids, Doeblers Seed, Seed Consultants Inc, Terral Seeds, AgVenture Inc) joint ventures, sales representatives, and independent dealers (Burrus Hybrids, Beck's Superior Hybrids).

Pioneer makes and sells hybrid seed and genetically modified seed, some of which goes on to become genetically modified food. Genes engineered into their products include the LibertyLink gene, which provides resistance to Bayer's Ignite/Liberty herbicides; the Herculex I Insect Protection gene which provides protection against various insects; the Herculex RW insect protection trait, which provides protection against other insects; the YieldGard Corn Borer gene, which provides resistance to another set of insects; and the Roundup Ready Corn 2 trait, which provides crop resistance against glyphosate herbicides. In 2010 Dupont Pioneer received approval to start marketing Plenish soybeans, which contains "the highest oleic acid content of any commercial soybean product, at more than 75%". Plenish is genetically engineered to "block the formation of enzymes that continue the cascade downstream from oleic acid (that produces saturated fats), resulting in an accumulation of the desirable monounsaturated acid."

== History ==
In 1926, farm journal editor and future U.S. Vice President Henry A. Wallace, along with a group of Des Moines, Iowa businessmen, founded the Hi-Bred Corn Company. The group included Henry's brother James W. Wallace, Fred Lehmann, J. J. Newlin, Simon Casady Jr. and George Kurtzweil. Wallace had been experimenting with hybridization of corn and became convinced that hybrid seed corn would become important.

Several generations of the Casady family were shareholders or officers at Pioneer, including Simon Casady Jr.'s son Simon Wheeler Casady III, who was a Pioneer director, secretary, and major shareholder. Simon Casady Jr.'s wife Grace Margaret Wheeler Casady was also a major shareholder. Simon and Grace's daughters Hortense Oldfather and Rose Casady McCay were also shareholders. In 1973, the Casady family owned over one million Pioneer shares, accounting for 10.9% of all shares.

== Timeline ==
- 1924 - Henry Wallace begins selling 'Copper Cross', an early commercial hybrid seed corn.
- 1926 - Hi-Bred Corn Company is founded in Des Moines, Iowa, with $7,000 in capital.
- 1931 - Roswell Garst agrees to produce/distribute seed. The following year Garst partners with Charles Thomas to form the Garst and Thomas Seed Corn Company.
- 1935 - "Pioneer" was added to the name of the company to distinguish it from other hybrid corn companies. The full name is "Pioneer Hi-Bred Corn Company".
- 1936 Pioneer founds Hy-Line Poultry Farms (later Hy-Line International) to produce hybrid egg-laying chickens. Henry B. Wallace (son of Henry A. Wallace) serves as president of Hy-Line until 1975.
- 1949 - Pioneer reaches annual sales of one million units.
- 1964 - a research station is established in Jamaica.
- 1970 - The company name is changed to Pioneer Hi-Bred International, Inc.
- 1973 - Becomes a publicly traded company.
- 1973 - Pioneer obtains a soybean product line through the purchase of Peterson Seed Company.
- 1975 - Purchases Lankhartt and Lockett companies (cotton seed business).
- 1977 - Pioneer acquires Microbial Products division to develop bacterial strains for inoculation into silage.
- 1978 - Hy-Line International is spun off.
- 1981 - Pioneer becomes the market-share leader in North America corn sales.
- 1982 - Annual sales pass the US$10 million mark.
- 1983 - The name of the soybean product line was changed from Peterson to Pioneer.
- 1991 - Pioneer purchases 2 million shares and establishes a partnership with Mycogen Seeds to develop Bt insect resistance in corn, sorghum, soybean, canola, sunflower, and other seeds. Pioneer sold the shares in 1998. Pioneer becomes the number one brand of soybeans in North America.
- 1992 - Pioneer paid $450,000 to Monsanto for rights to genetically modified soybean seeds that are resistant to RoundUp herbicide.
- 1993 - Pioneer paid $38 million to Monsanto for rights to Bt corn that is resistant to European corn borers.
- 1995 - Pioneer stock is listed on the NYSE as PHYB.
- 1996 - Pioneer acquires 20% stake in Sunseeds Co. (a hybrid vegetable seed producer) in exchange for Pioneer's vegetable seed operation.
- 1997 - DuPont acquires a 20% stake in Pioneer and the companies form a joint venture called Optimum Quality Grains LLC.
- 1999 - DuPont purchases the remaining 80% of Pioneer for $7.7 billion.
- 2006 - DuPont and Syngenta announce GreenLeaf Genetics LLC, a joint venture to market seed genetics and biotech traits.
- 2010 - DuPont and Syngenta end their joint venture, GreenLeaf Genetics LLC, with Syngenta retaining complete ownership.
- 2012 - Pioneer announces update to business name to be DuPont Pioneer.
- 2012 - Lawsuit regarding pesticides and dust by 200 residents of Waimea, Kauai against Pioneer Hi-Bred International, a DuPont company.
- 2012 - DuPont Pioneer completes acquisition of Panaar Seeds
- 2013 - DuPont agrees to pay Monsanto Co. at least $1.75 billion in a new licensing deal and both companies have agreed to dissolve their bitter legal battles over rights to technology for genetically modified seeds.
- 2014 - S&W Seed Company announces closing of acquisition of DuPont Pioneer alfalfa research and production assets.
- 2017 - Merges with Dow Agrosciences to form the Agriculture Division of DowDuPont.
- 2019 - The agriculture division is named Corteva and spun off from DowDuPont.

== Legal issues ==
A lawsuit was filed in 2011 by residents of Waimea, Kauai, against Pioneer. The 58-page lawsuit alleged that Pioneer's practices in the farming of genetically modified seed crops on fields next to Waimea unlawfully allowed pesticides and pesticide-laden fugitive dust to blow into residents' homes on almost a daily basis for more than 10 years. In May 2015, a jury awarded over $500,000 to 15 Waimea residents for property damage and loss of use due to dust from test fields.

== See also ==
- J. E. M. Ag Supply, Inc. v. Pioneer Hi-Bred International, Inc.
- DuPont
- Monsanto
- Genetically modified food controversies
