= Western Plant Health Association =

Western Plant Health Association is a nonprofit trade organization that represents the interests of fertilizer and crop protection manufacturers, biotechnology providers, distributors and retailers in California, Arizona and Hawaii, according to President Renee Pinel. Trade members comprise more than 90 percent of all the companies marketing commercial fertilizers, soil amendments, agricultural minerals and crop protection products in these three states. The association operates two Web sites: www.healthyplants.org, and www.calfertilizer.org. The association is one of the largest agricultural trade associations on the West Coast of the United States.

WPHA members support a variety of educational and research programs to ensure that all fertilizer and crop protection products are used in an environmentally sound way. WPHA-sponsored stewardship programs include: the California Department of Food and Agriculture's Fertilizer Research and Education program; the Coalition for Urban Renewal and Stewardship (CURES); the Anhydrous Ammonia Transportation Safety Program; and several worker protection projects as well as educational training and certification programs offered via the Internet and through trade media. WPHA also conducts recruiting events to persuade students to consider careers in agriculture by offering annual student dinners at campuses throughout California.

The California Fertilizer Foundation is also overseen and managed by the Western Plant Health Association. One of the Foundation's key functions is raising money to finance annual school garden grants for 24 elementary school campuses in California. The grants are $1,200 each and subsidize the creation of school gardens with the intention of teaching students to understand the value of plant nutrition and to appreciate all the work that goes into farming to keep the U.S. and the world stocked with a plentiful supply of safe and affordable food, while preventing possible harmful environmental impacts.
