= College of Tropical Agriculture and Human Resources =

Established in 1907, the College of Tropical Agriculture and Human Resilience (CTAHR) is the founding college of the University of Hawaii at Manoa in Honolulu, Hawai‘i. The College focuses on tropical agriculture, food science and human nutrition, textiles and clothing, and human resources, and its work precedes the creation of the university.
