= Corteva =

American agriculture company

Corteva, Inc.
- Type: Public
- Traded as: NYSE: CTVA; S&P 400 component
- ISIN: US22052L1044
- Industry: Agricultural chemicals
- Predecessors: Dow AgroSciences; E. I. du Pont de Nemours and Company (legal)
- Founded: March 2018; 8 years ago
- Headquarters: Indianapolis, Indiana, U.S.
- Key people: Chuck Magro (CEO)
- Revenue: ▲US$17.401 billion (2025)
- Operating income: ▲US$1.204 billion (2025)
- Net income: ▲US$1.105 billion (2025)
- Total assets: ▲US$42.845 billion (2025)
- Total equity: ▲US$24.144 billion (2025)
- Number of employees: 21,500 (2025)
- Parent: DowDuPont (2018–2019)
- Subsidiaries: Pioneer Hi-Bred International
- Website: corteva.com

Corteva, Inc. (also known as Corteva Agriscience) is an American company devoted to products for seeds and crop protection, including herbicides, insecticides, fungicides, and biologicals (natural herbicides) that are sold in 110 countries. The company's name combines "cor" (Latin for "heart") with "teva" (the Hebrew word for nature). It is headquartered in Indianapolis, Indiana. Its primary brand is Pioneer Hi-Bred International.

== History ==
After the merger of the Dow Chemical Company and DuPont to form DowDuPont in August 2017, Corteva was formed in March 2018 as a subsidiary handling the parent company's agriculture activities, which focused on seeds and crop protection. In June 2019, DowDuPont completed the corporate spin-off of the company and Corteva became a public company. Included in the spin-off was E. I. du Pont de Nemours and Company, the former corporate entity of DuPont which was designated as the predecessor to Corteva and was renamed to EIDP, Inc. in January 2023.

In March 2019, Corteva commissioned Charles River Laboratories to test its new fungicide on 36 beagles. Corteva argued that such testing is required by regulatory authorities but, after outrage from the Humane Society of the United States, the company agreed to stop the tests and release the animals to Michigan Humane for adoption.

In February 2020, Corteva ceased production of the pesticide chlorpyrifos due to declining sales after the product was linked to neurological problems in children and following bans in the European Union and some US states.

In March 2023, the company acquired Stoller Group, a maker of natural pesticides for $1.2 billion. It also acquired Symborg, an expert in microbiological technologies based in Murcia, Spain. This was part of an overall strategy to grow and strengthen an emerging biologicals product portfolio.

In November 2024, the company partnered with BP to develop a low carbon intensive bio-feedstock for the production of aviation biofuel. Also in November 2024, the company acquired the naming rights to the Indiana Farmers Coliseum at the Indiana State Fairgrounds. In 2025, the company introduced Forcivo, a fungicide for corn and soybeans containing flutriafol, azoxystrobin, and fluindapyr and targeting tar spot, southern rust, and frogeye leaf spot. In September 2025, the Wall Street Journal reported the company was exploring a breakup that would separate its seed and pesticide businesses. The company confirmed it planned to separate the businesses in October 2025. In May 2026, Corteva announced the name Vylor for its seed and genetics business.

== Legal issues ==
In July 2020, a U.S. appeals court ruled that Corteva can continue to sell Enlist Duo, which contains glyphosate and a salt of 2,4-D and choline, after environmentalists attempted to block sales of the chemical due to its claimed negative effects on plants and wildlife. However, the court ruled that the U.S. Environmental Protection Agency properly relied on studies that showed that the volatility of 2,4-D choline salt will not cause unreasonable harm to the environment.

In August 2022, Bayer sued Corteva for breach of contractual obligations related to the development and commercialization of E3 soybeans. Corteva then sued Bayer, alleging that Bayer infringed upon its patents on a gene used in Enlist Corn, which is resistant to herbicides such as Roundup. In May 2025, the case was paused until the US Supreme Court considers whether to take up a separate patent-related case.

In September 2022, the Federal Trade Commission sued Syngenta and Corteva, challenging certain US-based discount programs that allegedly block and restrict generic competition from pesticide markets. In January 2024, a federal judge denied a motion to dismiss the lawsuit.

== See also ==
- Genetically modified food controversies
