= Mycogen Seeds =

- Company type: Agriculture–Subsidiary
- Industry: Agriculture
- Founded: San Diego, California (1982)
- Headquarters: Indianapolis, Indiana, United States
- Products: Hybrid and varietal seeds
- Parent: Corteva Agriscience
- Website: www.mycogen.com

Mycogen Seeds, headquartered in Indianapolis, Indiana, United States, provides seeds for agriculture. Mycogen produces, markets and sells hybrid seed corn. The company also markets and sells sorghum, sunflower, soybean, alfalfa, and canola.

The Mycogen Corporation was formed in 1982 by members of the San Diego business and scientific communities, including David H. Rammler, a partner in the venture capital firm of Vanguard Associates, who served as the first chairman of the company, and Andrew C. Barnes, a biochemist with an MBA from the Stanford School of Business. The original concept was to develop environmentally safe herbicides from fungi using genetic engineering, thus the name Mycogen, coined from the Greek words for fungus and genetics. In 1998, the company was acquired by Dow Chemical Company. It then became a subsidiary of Corteva Agriscience from the merger and subsequent spin-offs of Dow and DuPont.

With the formation of Corteva Agriscience, in 2020 they announced that the Mycogen brand would be retired in favor of Brevant.
