= Glyphosate-based herbicides =

Roundup and similar herbicides

Glyphosate-based herbicides are herbicides made of a glyphosate salt usually combined with other ingredients needed to allow penetration into plants. Roundup was the first glyphosate-based herbicide, developed by Monsanto in the 1970s. It is used most heavily on corn, soy, and cotton crops that have been genetically modified to be resistant to the herbicide.

Some products include two active ingredients, such as Enlist Duo which includes 2,4-D as well as glyphosate. As of 2010, more than 750 glyphosate products were on the market.

Glyphosate and glyphosate-based herbicides have low acute toxicity in mammals. They likewise have not been shown to pose a significant risk to human health during normal use, although human deaths have been reported from deliberate ingestion of concentrated RoundUp. It is difficult to determine how much surfactants contribute to the overall toxicity of each formulation. Glyphosate formulations containing the surfactant polyethoxylated tallow amine (POEA) are sometimes used terrestrially, but are not approved for aquatic use in the US due to their toxicity to aquatic organisms.

There have been multiple lawsuits against Monsanto asserting that exposure to glyphosate herbicides is carcinogenic and that the company did not adequately disclose the risk to consumers. In 2018 a California jury awarded US$289 million in damages (later cut to US$78 million on appeal then reduced to $21 million after another appeal) to a groundskeeper who argued that Monsanto failed to adequately warn consumers of cancer risks posed by the herbicides.

== Background ==
The glyphosate-based herbicide RoundUp (styled: Roundup) was developed in the 1970s by Monsanto. Glyphosate was first registered for use in the U.S. in 1974. Glyphosate-based herbicides were initially used in a similar way to paraquat and diquat, as non-selective herbicides. Attempts were made to apply them to row crops, but problems with crop damage kept glyphosate-based herbicides from being widely used for this purpose. In the US, use of glyphosate experienced rapid growth following the commercial introduction of a glyphosate-resistant soybean in 1996. Between 1990 and 1996 sales of RoundUp increased around 20% per year. As of 2015 it is used in over 160 countries. RoundUp is used most heavily on corn, soy, and cotton crops that have been genetically modified to withstand the chemical, but since 2012 glyphosate was used in California to treat other crops like almond, peach, cantaloupe, onion, cherry, sweet corn, and citrus.

Bayer, which acquired Monsanto in 2018, is the largest producer of glyphosate-based herbicides, but formulations from other manufacturers are available that use different inert ingredients. Other glyphosate-based formulations include Bronco, Glifonox, KleenUp, Ranger Pro (styled: Ranger PRO), Rodeo, and Weedoff. Other manufacturers include Anhui Huaxing Chemical Industry Company, BASF, Dow AgroSciences, DuPont, Jiangsu Good Harvest-Weien Agrochemical Company, Nantong Jiangshan Agrochemical & Chemicals Co., Nufarm, SinoHarvest, Syngenta, and Zhejiang Xinan Chemical Industrial Group Company. As of 2010, more than 750 glyphosate products were on the market.

== Uses ==
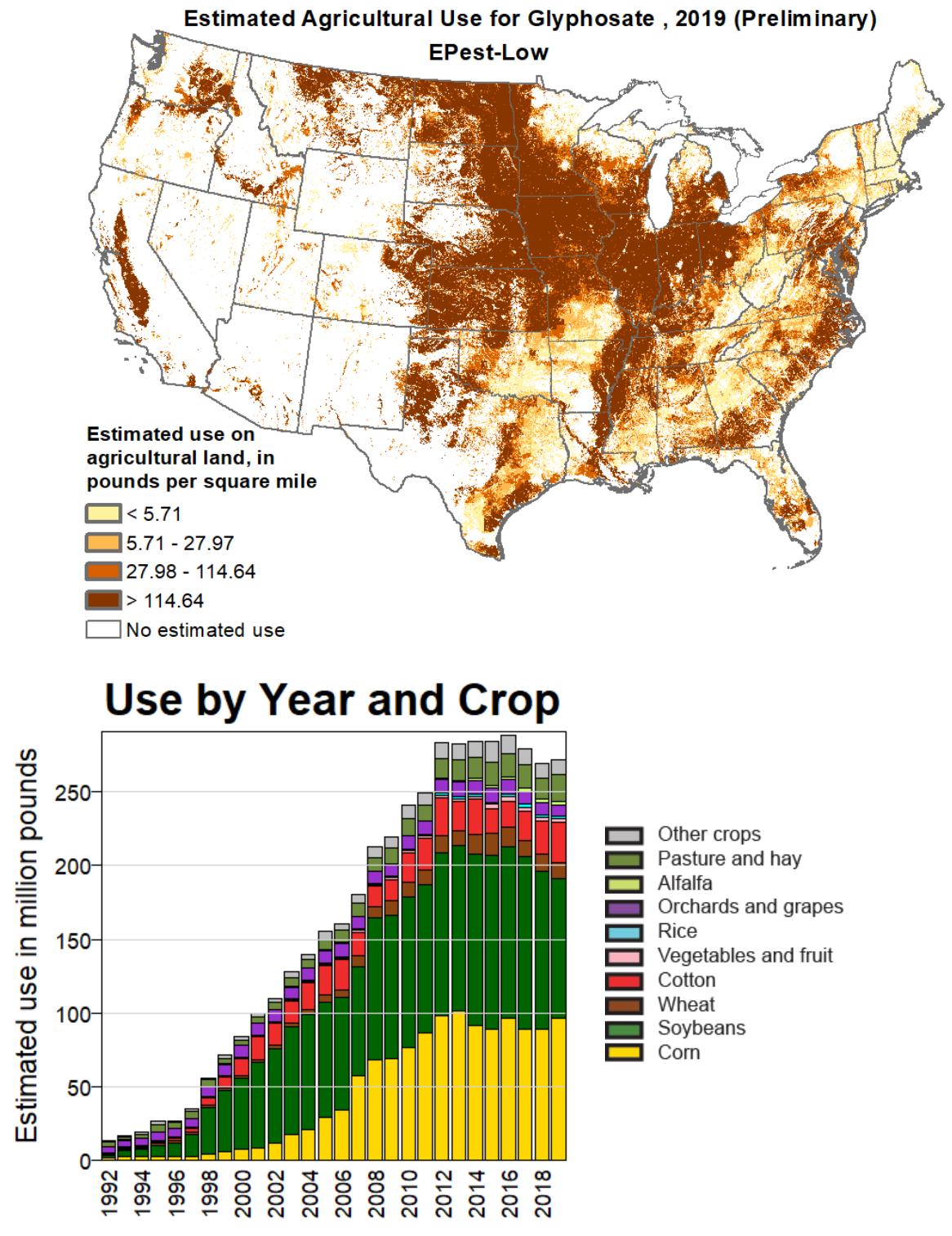
Estimated use in the US in 2019 and estimated total use from 1992 to 2019

Glyphosate is effective in killing a wide variety of plants, including grasses and broadleaf and woody plants. By volume, it is one of the most widely used herbicides. In 2007, glyphosate was the most used herbicide in the United States agricultural sector, with 180 to 185 million pounds (82,000 to 84,000 tonnes) applied, the second-most used in home and garden with 5 to 8 million pounds (2,300 to 3,600 tonnes) and 13 to 15 million pounds (5,900 to 6,800 tonnes) in non-agricultural settings. It is commonly used for agriculture, horticulture, viticulture, and silviculture purposes, as well as garden maintenance (including home use). It has a relatively small effect on some clover species and morning glory.

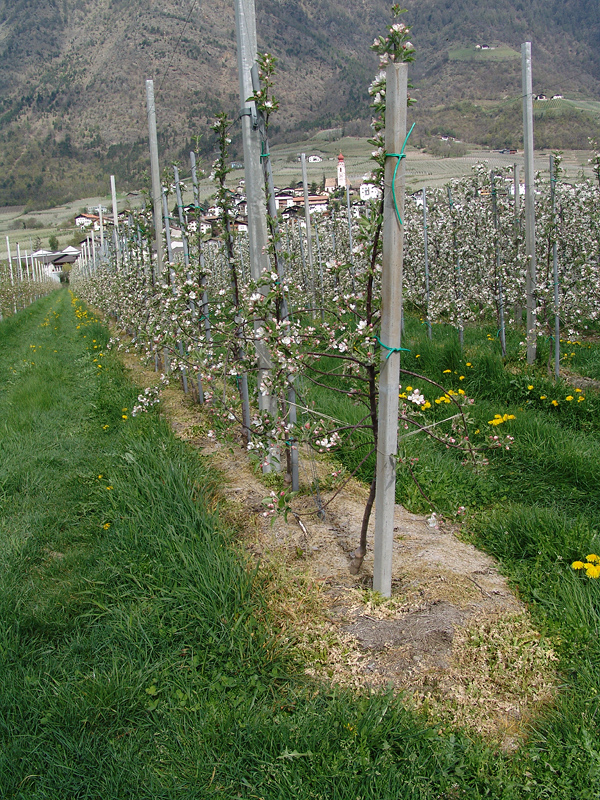
Glyphosate used as an alternative to mowing in an apple orchard in Ciardes, Italy

Glyphosate and related herbicides are often used in invasive species eradication and habitat restoration, especially to enhance native plant establishment in prairie ecosystems. The controlled application is usually combined with a selective herbicide and traditional methods of weed eradication such as mulching to achieve an optimal effect. Herbicides such as glyphosate are used for conifer release after wildfires or in managed plantations to reduce competition from invasive or fast-growing plants that would otherwise reduce tree establishment and growth.

In many cities, glyphosate is sprayed along the sidewalks and streets, as well as crevices in between pavement where weeds often grow. However, up to 24% of glyphosate applied to hard surfaces can be run off by water. Glyphosate contamination of surface water is attributed to urban and agricultural use. Glyphosate is used to clear railroad tracks and get rid of unwanted aquatic vegetation.

Since 1994, glyphosate had been used in aerial spraying in Colombia in coca eradication programs; Colombia announced in May 2015 that by October, it would cease using glyphosate in counternarcotic programs. The Colombian government has explored options to restart use of glyphosate for these programs, though courts have major restrictions on how use could resume.

Glyphosate is also used for crop desiccation to increase harvest yield and uniformity. Glyphosate itself is not a chemical desiccant; rather crop desiccants are so named because application just before harvest kills the crop plants so that the food crop dries from normal environmental conditions ("dry-down") more quickly and evenly. (Note: In agriculture, the term desiccant is applied to an agent that promotes dry down. "True desiccants" are not chemical desiccants either, rather the distinction is whether an agent is a contact herbicide such as Diquat and sodium chlorate that rapidly kill the above-ground portion of the plant as it dries out over a few days, or an agent such as glyphosate that is absorbed systemically and translocated to the root, a process that can take days to weeks.) Because glyphosate is systemic, excess residue levels can persist in plants due to incorrect application and this may render the crop unfit for sale. When applied appropriately, it can promote useful effects. In sugarcane, for example, glyphosate application increases sucrose concentration before harvest. In grain crops (wheat, barley, oats), uniformly dried crops do not have to be windrowed (swathed and dried) prior to harvest, but can easily be straight-cut and harvested. This saves the farmer time and money, which is important in northern regions where the growing season is short, and it enhances grain storage when the grain has a lower and more uniform moisture content.

=== Genetically modified crops ===
Some micro-organisms have a version of 5-enolpyruvylshikimate-3-phosphate synthase (EPSPS) resistant to glyphosate inhibition. A version of the enzyme that was both resistant to glyphosate and that was still efficient enough to drive adequate plant growth was identified by Monsanto scientists after much trial and error in an Agrobacterium strain called CP4, which was found surviving in a waste-fed column at a glyphosate production facility. This CP4 EPSPS gene was cloned and transfected into soybeans. In 1996, genetically modified soybeans were made commercially available. Current glyphosate-resistant crops include soy, maize (corn), canola, alfalfa, sugar beets, and cotton, with wheat still under development.

In 2023, 91% of corn, 95% of soybeans, and 94% of cotton produced in the United States were from variety that were genetically modified to be tolerant to multiple herbicides, including dicamba, glufosinate, and glyphosate.

== Inert ingredients ==
Surfactants, solvents, and preservatives are adjuvants, inert ingredients that are commonly added to glyphosate-based herbicide formulations to increase their efficacy. Some products contain all the necessary adjuvants, including surfactant; some contain no adjuvant system, while other products contain only a limited amount of adjuvant. Some formulations require the addition of surfactants to the spray tank before application. The names of inert ingredients used in glyphosate formulations are usually not listed on the product labels.

POEA is a surfactant added to Roundup and other herbicides as a wetting agent. POEA is not a single surfactant, but a complex mixture. The composition of each POEA surfactant is a proprietary trade secret. Monsanto's RoundUp, for example, contains a proprietary POEA surfactant called MON 0818 at a 15% concentration.

== Regulatory history ==
=== European Union ===
As part of the process to renew glyphosate's license under EU regulations, a 2013 systematic review by the German Federal Institute for Risk Assessment (Bfr) of epidemiological studies of workers exposed to glyphosate formulations found no significant risk, stating that "the available data are contradictory and far from being convincing". In 2015, as part of the ongoing renewal process, the European Food Safety Authority (EFSA) published a final risk assessment on 12 November 2015 stating that glyphosate met EU-level regulatory standards. Despite classifying glyphosate as non-carcinogenic, this report also acknowledged that some of the co-formulants added to glyphosate based pesticides "appeared to have toxic effects higher than the glyphosate itself", noting POEA in particular. The conclusion of the final EFSA assessment was that the active ingredient glyphosate met EU-level regulatory standards, but individual formulations would have to be evaluated by member states.

There was insufficient support among the Member States for a 2016 European Commission proposal to renew the approval of glyphosate. Because the 2015 EFSA and IARC assessments had reached contradictory conclusions regarding the potential carcinogenicity of glyphosate, the European Chemicals Agency (ECHA) was asked to assess the hazard properties of the substance. Though no majority of Member States voted either for or against the renewal proposal, in July 2016 they voted to amend the conditions of glyphosate's existing approval. The new conditions require Member States to minimize the pre-harvest use of glyphosate products, as well as use in certain public places. Formulations that include the surfactant POEA were banned. These conditions were later included in the implementing act for the 5-year renewal that was approved on 12 December 2017.

=== United States ===
In 2014 the EPA approved Enlist Duo, which was developed by Dow AgroSciences. This herbicide combined two active ingredients: 2,4-D and glyphosate. Enlist Duo is intended for use with genetically modified crops that have also been developed by the Dow Chemical subsidiary. The initial approval was limited to the states of Illinois, Indiana, Iowa, Ohio, South Dakota, and Wisconsin. During the course of litigation in 2015, the EPA found out that Dow had told the United States Patent and Trademark Office that Enlist Duo offers "synergistic herbicidal weed control", and requested additional clarification about the "synergistic effects" and sought to reverse its approval pending a full review of the new information provided by Dow. In 2016, the 9th Circuit rejected the EPA's petition to vacate its approval of the herbicide.

Since some glyphosate herbicide formulations contain an inert ingredient that may be toxic to fish and amphibians, only formulations labeled for aquatic use are recommended when water contamination is possible. Aquatic formulations using the isopropylamine salt of glyphosate include Glypro (also called Rodeo, Aquapro, and Accord Concentrate) and Shore-Klear. Refuge is also approved for aquatic applications; the active ingredient in this formulation is the potassium salt of glyphosate. There are a few aquatic formulations that already include a surfactant that are registered for aquatic applications including GlyphoMate41 and Shore-Klear Plus, but most aquatic formulations do not include surfactant. The composition of surfactants is proprietary and non-disclosed, but low-toxicity surfactants that are labeled for aquatic use are available.

== Legal ==
On 10 August 2018, Dewayne "Lee" Johnson, who has non-Hodgkin's lymphoma, was awarded $289 million in damages in the case Johnson v. Monsanto Co. (later cut to $78 million on appeal then reduced to $21 million after another appeal) after a jury in San Francisco found that Monsanto had failed to adequately warn consumers of cancer risks posed by the herbicide. Johnson had routinely used two different glyphosate formulations in his work as a groundskeeper, RoundUp and another Monsanto product called Ranger Pro. The jury's verdict addressed the question of whether Monsanto knowingly failed to warn consumers that RoundUp could be harmful, but not whether RoundUp causes cancer. Court documents from the case show the company's efforts to influence scientific research via ghostwriting. After the IARC classified glyphosate as a "probably carcinogenic to humans" in 2015, over 300 federal lawsuits have been filed that were consolidated into a multidistrict litigation called In re: RoundUp Products Liability.

In March 2019, a man was awarded $80 million in a lawsuit claiming Roundup was a substantial factor in his cancer, resulting in Costco stores discontinuing sales. In July 2019, U.S. District Judge Vince Chhabria reduced the settlement to $26 million. Chhabria stated that a punitive award was appropriate because the evidence "easily supported a conclusion that Monsanto was more concerned with tamping down safety inquiries and manipulating public opinion than it was with ensuring its product is safe." Chhabria stated that there is evidence is on both sides concerning whether glyphosate causes cancer and that the behavior of Monsanto showed "a lack of concern about the risk that its product might be carcinogenic."

On 13 May 2019 a jury in California ordered Bayer to pay a couple $2 billion in damages after finding that the company had failed to adequately inform consumers of the possible carcinogenicity of Roundup. On July 26, 2019, an Alameda County judge cut the settlement to $86.7 million, stating that the judgement by the jury exceeded legal precedent.

In June 2020, Bayer agreed to settle over a hundred thousand Roundup lawsuits, agreeing to pay $8.8 to $9.6 billion to settle those claims, and $1.5 billion for any future claims. The settlement does not include three cases that have already gone to jury trials and are being appealed.

== Acute toxicity ==
The lethal dose of different glyphosate-based formulations varies, especially with respect to the surfactants used. Formulations intended for terrestrial use that include the surfactant polyethoxylated tallow amine (POEA) can be more toxic than other formulations for aquatic species. Due to the variety in available formulations, including five different glyphosate salts and different combinations of inert ingredients, it is difficult to determine how much surfactants contribute to the overall toxicity of each formulation. Independent scientific reviews and regulatory agencies have regularly concluded that glyphosate-based herbicides do not lead to a significant risk for human or environmental health when the product label is properly followed.

=== Human ===
The acute oral toxicity for mammals is low, but death has been reported after deliberate overdose of concentrated formulations. The surfactants in glyphosate formulations can increase the relative acute toxicity of the formulation. Surfactants generally do not, however, cause synergistic effects (as opposed to additive effects) that increase the acute toxicity of glyphosate within a formulation. It is unclear whether the surfactant POEA increases or reduces the overall toxicity of glyphosate-based formulations. Deliberate ingestion of Roundup ranging from 85 to 200 mL (of 41% solution) has resulted in death within hours of ingestion, although it has also been ingested in quantities as large as 500 mL with only mild or moderate symptoms. Consumption of over 85 mL of concentrated product causes serious symptoms, including burns due to corrosive effects as well as kidney and liver damage.

Forest visitors and nearby residents could be exposed to herbicide drift, vegetation with herbicide residues, and to accidental spraying. They also could eat food or drink water containing herbicide residues.

In a 2017 risk assessment, the European Chemicals Agency (ECHA) wrote: "There is very limited information on skin irritation in humans. Where skin irritation has been reported, it is unclear whether it is related to glyphosate or co-formulants in glyphosate-containing herbicide formulations." The ECHA concluded that available human data was insufficient to support classification for skin corrosion or irritation.

Inhalation is typically less harmful, though mist particles can result in irritation within the mouth or nostrils. Minor conjunctivitis can occur from eye exposure, and damage to the cornea can develop if the eye is not thoroughly rinsed after exposure.

=== Aquatic ===
Glyphosate products for aquatic use generally do not use surfactants, and formulations with POEA are not approved for aquatic use due to aquatic organism toxicity. Due to the presence of POEA, glyphosate formulations only allowed for terrestrial use are more toxic for amphibians and fish than glyphosate alone. Terrestrial glyphosate formulations that include the surfactants POEA and MON 0818 (75% POEA) may have negative impacts on various aquatic organisms like protozoa, mussels, crustaceans, frogs and fish. Aquatic organism exposure risk to terrestrial formulations with POEA may occur due to drift, agricultural runoff or temporary water pockets. While laboratory studies can show effects of glyphosate formulations on aquatic organisms, similar observations rarely occur in the field when instructions on the herbicide label are followed.

Studies in a variety of amphibians have shown the toxicity of GBFs containing POEA to amphibian larvae. These effects include interference with gill morphology and mortality from either the loss of osmotic stability or asphyxiation. At sub-lethal concentrations, exposure to POEA or glyphosate/POEA formulations has been associated with delayed development, accelerated development, reduced size at metamorphosis, developmental malformations of the tail, mouth, eye and head, histological indications of intersex and symptoms of oxidative stress. Glyphosate-based formulations can cause oxidative stress in bullfrog tadpoles. The use of glyphosate-based pesticides are not considered the major cause of amphibian decline, the bulk of which occurred prior to widespread use of glyphosate or in pristine tropical areas with minimal glyphosate exposure.

=== Mammals ===
Pure chemical grade glyphosate is slightly toxic to birds and is virtually nontoxic to fish, aquatic invertebrates and honeybees. However, commercial herbicide formulations consist of combinations of glyphosate salts, adjuvants and surfactants, and are not tested as such prior to regulatory approval. Due to the presence of a toxic inert ingredient, some glyphosate end-use products must be labeled, "Toxic to fish," if they may be applied directly to aquatic environments. In mammals, most glyphosate is excreted, unchanged, in urine and feces. In rats, Glyphosate was not broken down given in oral doses, and it did not bioaccumulate.

== Sub-lethal effects ==
Most regulatory studies require only short-term exposure to high levels of the regulated substance, and do not investigate the effects of long-term exposure to sub-lethal levels. There is now increasing concern that chronic exposure to sub-lethal levels of glyphosate based herbicides may be having severe effects on ecosystem, animal and human health, especially when considering the possibility of synergistic effects with other chemicals also present in the environment.

Laboratory animal research reveals potential impacts on reproduction, carcinogenesis and even multigenerational and transgenerational effects, due to epigenetic changes. Trangenerational studies showed dramatic effects on fertility, neurological development, prostate disease, obesity, kidney disease, ovarian disease, and parturition (birth) abnormalities in the grand offspring (F2) and great-grand-offspring (F3) of mothers exposed to glyphosate.

Biomonitoring studies suggest that humans in a non-agricultural setting may be exposed to glyphosate through drinking water and by eating products derived from crops contaminated with this herbicide, especially as glyphosate has been shown to accumulate in plant tissues to levels much higher than present in the environment. Significant glyphosate residues have been detected in multiple crops, including honey, corn, wheat and soy products.

A 2018 study in central Indiana found that > 90% of pregnant women had detectable urinary glyphosate levels and that these levels correlated significantly with shortened pregnancy lengths.

Glyphosate exposure has also been implicated as a contributing factor in the development of chronic kidney disease in agricultural workers.

== Carcinogenicity of active ingredient ==
There is limited evidence human cancer risk might increase as a result of occupational exposure to large amounts of glyphosate, such as agricultural work, but no good evidence of such a risk from home use, such as in domestic gardening. The consensus among national pesticide regulatory agencies is that labeled uses of glyphosate have demonstrated no evidence of human carcinogenicity. Organizations such as the Joint FAO/WHO Meeting on Pesticide Residues, European Commission, Canadian Pest Management Regulatory Agency, and the German Federal Institute for Risk Assessment have concluded that there is no evidence that glyphosate poses a carcinogenic or genotoxic risk to humans. The final assessment of the Australian Pesticides and Veterinary Medicines Authority in 2017 was that "glyphosate does not pose a carcinogenic risk to humans". In a draft document the EPA has classified glyphosate as "not likely to be carcinogenic to humans." One international scientific organization, the International Agency for Research on Cancer (IARC), affiliated with the WHO, has made claims of carcinogenicity in research reviews; in 2015 the IARC declared glyphosate "probably carcinogenic to humans."

== Environmental impact ==
Due to the widespread cultivation of crop species designed to withstand herbicide application, a move towards no-till agriculture, and weeds developing glyphosate resistance, increasing amounts of glyphosate-based herbicides are now required for weed control globally. This widespread and increasing use is leading to the detection of glyphosate in surface waters, sediment and soil across South America, North America, Europe, Asia and Africa, sometimes at levels above regulatory limits. However, regulatory limits vary immensely across jurisdictions. For example, maximum allowable drinking water levels in Europe are set at 100 ng/L while the Environmental Protection Agency in the USA allows up to 700 ug/L glyphosate in American drinking water, while in many countries allowable levels of glyphosate in the environment and drinking water are not regulated at all.

In crops and other plants, there is evidence that glyphosate exposure can lead to increased susceptibility to disease, especially fungal root rot, and changes in mineral nutrition.

On a wider front, there is the added concern that the widespread agricultural use of glyphosate may be contributing to antibiotic resistance and changes in soil and other microbiomes, as this herbicide is known to act as an antibiotic and affects microbial and fungal communities.

As mentioned before, glyphosate-based herbicides can be harmful to freshwater and marine aquatic life, affecting invertebrates, amphibians and fish especially in their juvenile life stages. Lately, research has focused on what happens when organisms are exposed to low levels of herbicide over longer time periods, at levels detected during environmental monitoring. The results suggest a level of concern is warranted - exposure to environmentally realistic levels of glyphosate based herbicides (10 ug/L to 20 ug/L) have been shown to negatively affect blood parameters of the mussel Mytilus galloprovincialis and the clam Ruditapes philippinarum, as well as decreasing reproduction and growth of the estuarine crab Neohelice granulata.

Glyphosate based herbicides may be leading to overgrowth of blue-green algae in freshwater bodies, while levels as low as 1 ug/L can lead to total loss of recruitment in the canopy forming marine macroalga, Carpodesmia crinita potentially leading to population collapse. Glyphosate exposure can also alter the structure of natural freshwater bacterial and zooplankton communities. Researchers found that for zooplankton, aquatic concentrations of 0.1 mg/L glyphosate were sufficient to cause diversity loss. These effects on organisms at the base of the food chain may have long term unintended effects.

Glyphosate is also being detected in wildlife, with long term effects unknown. For example a study published in 2021 detected glyphosate in 55% of sampled Florida manatees' plasma, with blood levels increasing significantly from 2009 until 2019. In the same study, glyphosate was ubiquitous in surface water samples.

== Supply chain issues ==
Between January and November 2021, the price of glyphosate rose 25 percent due to the effects of the 2021–2022 global supply chain crisis and COVID-19. In February 2022, Bayer AG announced they would be declaring a force majeure following a mechanical failure and production shutdown at a key supplier. Shortages were expected to lead to increased costs for cotton, soybean and corn producers.
