= GBH =

GBH may refer to:

== Arts, entertainment and media ==
- GBH (band), an English punk band
- GBH, trade name of the WGBH Educational Foundation and some of its public media outlets, including GBH 2 (WGBH-TV) and GBH 44 (WGBX-TV)
- G.B.H. (TV series), a seven-part British television drama shown in the summer of 1991 on Channel 4
- The Grand Budapest Hotel, a 2014 film by Wes Anderson
- Great Bash Heel, a professional wrestling stable
- GBH, a 1980 novel by Ted Lewis

== Other uses ==
- GBH (design and advertising agency), a London-based design and advertising agency
- Grievous bodily harm, a term used in English criminal law
- Glyphosate-based herbicide
- Union of Construction and Woodworkers, an Austrian trade union

== See also ==
- GHB (disambiguation)
