= Operation Wipeout =

1990 United States anti-cannabis operation

Operation Wipeout was a cannabis eradication program by the United States' Drug Enforcement Administration, begun in 1990 and focused on destroying outdoor cannabis crops in Hawaii by aerial spraying. The program used glyphosate herbicide, combined with a soap-based sticking agent and Red Dye Number 23.

The 1990 iteration destroyed 735,000 cannabis plants of Hawaii's summer crop, half of that through aerial spraying.

Wipeout forced growers to move from outdoor grows to more expensive indoor grows, and the price of cannabis more than doubled from $2,500 to $6,000 per pound.
