= Roundup (herbicide) =

Glyphosate-based herbicide made by Monsanto

Manufacturing status
- Manufacturer: Bayer
- Type: Herbicide
- Introduced to market: 1974

Purposes
- Agriculture: Non-selective post-emergence weed control

Herbicide properties
- Surfactant: Polyethoxylated tallow amine (most common)
- Main active ingredient: Isopropylamine salt of glyphosate
- Mode of action: 5-enolpyruvylshikimate-3-phosphate synthase (EPSPS) inhibitor
- Website: roundup.com

Roundup is a brand name of herbicide originally produced by Monsanto, which Bayer acquired in 2018. Prior to the late-2010s formulations, it used broad-spectrum glyphosate-based herbicides. As of 2009, sales of Roundup herbicides still represented about 10 percent of Monsanto's revenue despite competition from Chinese producers of other glyphosate-based herbicides. The overall Roundup line of products represented about half of Monsanto's yearly revenue in 2009. The product is marketed to consumers by Scotts Miracle-Gro Company. In the late-2010s other non-glyphosate containing herbicides were also sold under the Roundup brand as "Roundup for Lawns".

Monsanto patented the herbicidal use of glyphosate and derivatives in 1971. Commercial sale and usage in significant quantities started in 1974. It retained exclusive rights to glyphosate in the US until its US patent expired in September 2000; in other countries the patent expired earlier. The Roundup trademark is registered with the US Patent and Trademark Office and still extant. However, glyphosate is no longer under patent, so similar products use it as an active ingredient.

The main active ingredient of Roundup is the isopropylamine salt of glyphosate. Another ingredient of Roundup is the surfactant POEA (polyethoxylated tallow amine).

Monsanto also produced seeds which grow into plants genetically engineered to be tolerant to glyphosate, which are known as Roundup Ready crops. The genes contained in these seeds are patented. Such crops allow farmers to use glyphosate as a post-emergence herbicide against most broadleaf and cereal weeds.

The health impacts of the product as well as its effects on the environment have been at the center of substantial legal and scientific controversies. In June 2020, Bayer agreed to pay $9.6 billion to settle tens of thousands of claims, mostly alleging that glyphosate-based Roundup had caused cancer. In 2026, Bayer reached an agreement with the second Trump Administration, allowing for the continued sale of glyphosate in the United States.

== Composition ==
Glyphosate-based formulations may contain a number of adjuvants, the identities of which may be proprietary. Surfactants are used in herbicide formulations as wetting agents, to maximize coverage and aid penetration of the herbicide(s) through plant leaves. As agricultural spray adjuvants, surfactants may be pre-mixed into commercial formulations or they may be purchased separately and mixed on-site.

Polyethoxylated tallow amine (POEA) is a surfactant used in the original Roundup formulation and was commonly used in 2015. Different versions of Roundup have included different percentages of POEA. A 1997 US government report said that Roundup is 15% POEA while Roundup Pro is 14.5%. Since POEA is more toxic to fish and amphibians than glyphosate alone, POEA is not allowed in aquatic formulations.

Non-glyphosate formulations of Roundup are typically used for lawns that glyphosate would otherwise kill. Both types of products being sold under the Roundup brand name can be a source of confusion for consumers. Active ingredients for non-glyphosate formulations of Roundup can include MCPA, quinclorac, dicamba, and sulfentrazone, penoxsulam, and 2,4-D

== Acute toxicity ==
The lethal dose of different glyphosate-based formulations varies, especially with respect to the surfactants used. Formulations intended for terrestrial use that include the surfactant POEA can be more toxic than other formulations for aquatic species. Due to the variety in available formulations, including five different glyphosate salts and different combinations of inert ingredients, it is difficult to determine how much surfactants contribute to the overall toxicity of each formulation. Independent scientific reviews and regulatory agencies have repeatedly concluded that glyphosate-based herbicides do not lead to a significant risk for human or environmental health when the product label is properly followed.

=== Human ===
The acute oral toxicity for mammals is low, but death has been reported after deliberate overdose of concentrated Roundup. Deliberate ingestion of Roundup ranging from 85 to 200 ml (of 41% solution) has resulted in death within hours of ingestion, although it has also been ingested in quantities as large as 500 ml with only mild or moderate symptoms. Consumption of over 85 ml of concentrated product is likely to cause serious symptoms in adults, including burns due to corrosive effects as well as kidney and liver damage. More severe cases lead to "respiratory distress, impaired consciousness, pulmonary edema, infiltration on chest X-ray, shock, arrhythmias, kidney failure requiring haemodialysis, metabolic acidosis, and hyperkalaemia" and death is often preceded by bradycardia and ventricular arrhythmias. The surfactants in glyphosate formulations can increase the relative acute toxicity of the formulation. Surfactants generally do not, however, cause synergistic effects (as opposed to additive effects) that increase the acute toxicity of glyphosate within a formulation. It is unclear whether the surfactant POEA increases or reduces the overall toxicity of glyphosate-based formulations.

Skin exposure can cause irritation, and photocontact dermatitis has been occasionally reported. Severe skin burns are very rare. In a 2017 risk assessment, the European Chemicals Agency (ECHA) wrote: "There is very limited information on skin irritation in humans. Where skin irritation has been reported, it is unclear whether it is related to glyphosate or co-formulants in glyphosate-containing herbicide formulations." The ECHA concluded that available human data was insufficient to support classification for skin corrosion or irritation.

Inhalation is a minor route of exposure, but spray mist may cause oral or nasal discomfort, an unpleasant taste in the mouth, or tingling and irritation in the throat. Eye exposure may lead to mild conjunctivitis. Superficial corneal injury is possible if irrigation is delayed or inadequate.

=== Aquatic ===
Glyphosate formulations with POEA, such as Roundup, are not approved for aquatic use due to aquatic organism toxicity. Due to the presence of POEA, glyphosate formulations only allowed for terrestrial use are more toxic for amphibians and fish than glyphosate alone. Terrestrial glyphosate formulations that include the surfactants POEA and MON 0818 (75% POEA) may have negative impacts on various aquatic organisms like protozoa, mussels, crustaceans, frogs and fish. Aquatic organism exposure risk to terrestrial formulations with POEA is limited to drift or temporary water pockets. While laboratory studies can show effects of glyphosate formulations on aquatic organisms, similar observations rarely occur in the field when instructions on the herbicide label are followed.

Studies in a variety of amphibians have shown the toxicity of products containing POEA to amphibian larvae. These effects include interference with gill morphology and mortality from either the loss of osmotic stability or asphyxiation. At sub-lethal concentrations, exposure to POEA or glyphosate/POEA formulations have been associated with delayed development, accelerated development, reduced size at metamorphosis, developmental malformations of the tail, mouth, eye and head, histological indications of intersex and symptoms of oxidative stress. Glyphosate-based formulations can cause oxidative stress in bullfrog tadpoles. The use of glyphosate-based pesticides are not considered the major cause of amphibian decline, the bulk of which occurred prior to widespread use of glyphosate or in pristine tropical areas with minimal glyphosate exposure.

A 2000 review of the toxicological data on Roundup concluded that "for terrestrial uses of Roundup minimal acute and chronic risk was predicted for potentially exposed nontarget organisms". It also concluded that there were some risks to aquatic organisms exposed to Roundup in shallow water.

=== Bees ===
Roundup Ready‐To‐Use, Roundup No Glyphosate, and Roundup ProActive have all been found to cause significant mortality in bumblebees when sprayed directly on them. It has been hypothesized that this is due to surfactants in the formulations blocking the tracheal system of the bees.

== Carcinogenicity ==
There is limited evidence that human cancer risk might increase as a result of occupational exposure to large amounts of glyphosate, such as agricultural work, but there is no good evidence of such a risk from home use, such as in domestic gardening. The consensus among national pesticide regulatory agencies and scientific organizations is that labeled uses of glyphosate have demonstrated no evidence of human carcinogenicity. Organizations such as the Joint FAO/WHO Meeting on Pesticide Residues and the European Commission, Canadian Pest Management Regulatory Agency, and the German Federal Institute for Risk Assessment have concluded that there is no evidence that glyphosate poses a carcinogenic or genotoxic risk to humans. The final assessment of the Australian Pesticides and Veterinary Medicines Authority in 2017 was that "glyphosate does not pose a carcinogenic risk to humans". The EPA has evaluated the carcinogenic potential of glyphosate multiple times since 1986. In 1986, glyphosate was initially classified as Group C: "Possible Human Carcinogen", but later recommended as Group D: "Not Classifiable as to Human Carcinogenicity" due to lack of statistical significance in previously examined rat tumor studies. In 1991, it was classified as Group E: "Evidence of Non-Carcinogenicity for Humans", and in 2015 and 2017, "Not Likely to be Carcinogenic to Humans".

One international scientific organization, the International Agency for Research on Cancer (IARC), classified glyphosate in Group 2A, "probably carcinogenic to humans" in 2015. The variation in classification between this agency and others has been attributed to "use of different data sets" and "methodological differences in the evaluation of the available evidence". In 2017, California environmental regulators listed glyphosate as “known to the state to cause cancer.” The state's Office of Environmental Health Hazard Assessment made the decision based in part on the report from the IARC. State Proposition 65 requires the state office to add substances the international agency deems carcinogenic in humans or laboratory animals to a state list of cancer-causing items.

== Legal ==
In the ten months following Bayer's June 2018 acquisition of Monsanto, its stock lost 46% of its value because of investor apprehension concerning the 11,200 lawsuits filed against its subsidiary. As of 2023, around 165,000 claims have been made against Bayer, mostly alleging that Roundup had caused cancer. Bayer has settled tens of thousands of those claims and has agreed to pay billions in damages, but, as of 2023, more than 50,000 similar claims were still pending. In December 2023, Bayer won a case against a claim that Roundup had caused a man's cancer. In a statement they said the outcome was "consistent with the evidence in this case that Roundup does not cause cancer and is not responsible for the plaintiff's illness". At that time, Bayer had previously won 10 of 15 such cases.

Most cases claiming injury from Roundup are based on a failure-to-warn theory of liability, meaning Monsanto is liable for a plaintiff's injury because it failed to warn the plaintiff that Roundup can cause cancer. The United States Court of Appeals for the Ninth Circuit in 2021, and the United States Court of Appeals for the Eleventh Circuit in early 2024, held that such state-law failure to warn claims were not preempted by the Federal Insecticide, Fungicide, and Rodenticide Act ("FIFRA"). In August 2024, however, the United States Court of Appeals for the Third Circuit held that FIFRA does preempt state-law failure to warn claims involving Roundup, expressly recognizing that its holding conflicts with that of the Ninth and Eleventh Circuits. This conflict among the Third, Ninth, and Eleventh Circuit creates a heightened potential that the United States Supreme Court will review the Third Circuit's decision so that the Supreme Court can resolve the conflict among the Courts of Appeals.

=== Cancer cases ===
As of October 30, 2019, there were more than 42,000 plaintiffs who said that glyphosate herbicides caused their cancer. After the IARC classified glyphosate as "probably carcinogenic to humans" in March 2015, many state and federal lawsuits were filed in the United States. Early on, over 300 of them were consolidated into a multidistrict litigation called In re: Roundup Products Liability.

On August 10, 2018, Dewayne Johnson, who has non-Hodgkin's lymphoma, was awarded $289 million in damages (later cut to $78 million on appeal then reduced to $21 million after another appeal) after a jury in San Francisco found that Monsanto had failed to adequately warn consumers of cancer risks posed by the herbicide. Johnson had routinely used two different glyphosate formulations in his work as a groundskeeper, Roundup and another Monsanto product called Ranger Pro. The jury's verdict addressed the question of whether Monsanto knowingly failed to warn consumers that Roundup could be harmful, but not whether Roundup causes cancer. Court documents from the case alleged the company's efforts to influence scientific research via ghostwriting.

In January 2019, Costco decided to stop carrying Roundup or other glyphosate-based herbicides. The decision was reportedly influenced in part by the public court cases.

In March 2019, a man was awarded $80 million (later cut to $26 million on appeal) in a lawsuit claiming Roundup was a substantial factor in his cancer. U.S. District Judge Vince Chhabria stated that a punitive award was appropriate because the evidence "easily supported a conclusion that Monsanto was more concerned with tamping down safety inquiries and manipulating public opinion than it was with ensuring its product is safe." Chhabria stated that there was evidence on both sides as to whether glyphosate causes cancer, and that the behavior of Monsanto showed "a lack of concern about the risk that its product might be carcinogenic."

On May 13, 2019, a jury in California ordered Bayer to pay a couple $2 billion in damages (later cut to $87 million on appeal) after finding that the company had failed to adequately inform consumers of the possible carcinogenicity of Roundup. On December 19, 2019, it was announced that Timothy Litzenburg, the lawyer for the Roundup Virginia plaintiffs had been charged with extortion after offering to stop searching for more plaintiffs if he was paid a $200 million consulting fee by a manufacturer of glyphosate. Litzenburg and his partner Daniel Kincheloe pleaded guilty to the charges and they were sentenced to two and one years in prison respectively.

In June 2020, Bayer agreed to settle more than a hundred thousand Roundup lawsuits, agreeing to pay $8.8 to $9.6 billion to settle those claims, and $1.5 billion for any future claims. The settlement does not include three cases that have already gone to jury trials and are being appealed. However the settlement was not allowed to cover future cases.

In the 2020s, facing billions of dollars in more claims, Bayer lobbied the U.S. Congress and state legislatures to change legal standards for pesticide labeling in an attempt to reduce its liability. As of 2024, the US EPA planned to reevaluate regulations in 2026.

In May 2025, Bayer announced that it was making another push to settle the pending lawsuits and that it would consider a Chapter 11 bankruptcy for its Monsanto division if the settlement plan was not successful. The company engaged law firms Latham & Watkins and AlixPartners to review its options.

=== False advertising ===
In 1996, Monsanto was accused of false and misleading advertising of glyphosate products, prompting a lawsuit by the New York State attorney general. Monsanto had made claims that its spray-on glyphosate based herbicides, including Roundup, were safer than table salt and "practically non-toxic" to mammals, birds, and fish, "environmentally friendly", and "biodegradable". Citing avoidance of costly litigation, Monsanto settled the case, admitting no wrongdoing, and agreeing to remove the offending advertising claims in New York State.

Environmental and consumer rights campaigners brought a case in France in 2001 accusing Monsanto of presenting Roundup as "biodegradable" and claiming that it "left the soil clean" after use; glyphosate, Roundup's main ingredient, was classed by the European Union as "dangerous for the environment" and "toxic for aquatic organisms". In January 2007, Monsanto was convicted of false advertising and fined 15,000 euros. The result was confirmed in 2009.

On 27 March 2020, Bayer settled claims in a proposed class action lawsuit—which alleged that it falsely advertised that the active ingredient in Roundup Weed & Grass Killer only affects plants—with a $39.5 million deal that included changing the labels on its products.

In June 2023, Bayer reached a $6.9 million settlement agreement with the New York attorney general, settling false advertising allegations concerning the safety of Roundup.

=== Ban in France ===
In January 2019, Roundup Pro 360 was banned in France following a Lyon court ruling that regulator ANSES had not given due weight to safety concerns when they approved the product in March 2017. The ban went into effect immediately. The court's decision cited research by the IARC, based in Lyon.

== Use with genetically modified crops ==
Monsanto first developed Roundup in the 1970s. End-users initially used it in a similar way to paraquat and diquat – as a non-selective herbicide. Application of glyphosate-based herbicides to row crops resulted in problems with crop damage and kept them from being widely used for this purpose. In the United States, use of Roundup experienced rapid growth following the commercial introduction of a glyphosate-resistant soybean in 1996. "Roundup Ready" became Monsanto's trademark for its patented line of crop seeds that are resistant to Roundup. Between 1990 and 1996 sales of Roundup increased around 20% per year. As of 2015 the product was used in over 160 countries. Roundup is used most heavily on corn, soy, and cotton crops that have been genetically modified to withstand the chemical, but as of 2012 glyphosate treated approximately 5 million acres in California for crops like almond, peach, cantaloupe, onion, cherry, sweet corn, and citrus, although the product is only applied directly to certain varieties of sweet corn.

== See also ==
- 2,4-Dichlorophenoxyacetic acid
- Environmental impact of pesticides
- Health effects of pesticides
- Integrated pest management
- Pesticide regulation in the United States
- Pesticides in the United States
