= John E. Franz =

American chemist (1929–2026)

- Born: December 21, 1929; Springfield, Illinois, U.S.
- Died: April 27, 2026 (aged 96)
- Known for: Inventor of Roundup
- Awards: National Medal of Technology; Carothers Award; Perkin Medal (1990)
- Scientific career
- Fields: Bio-Organic Chemistry

John Edward Franz (December 21, 1929 – April 27, 2026) was an American organic chemist who discovered the herbicide glyphosate while working at Monsanto Company in 1970. The chemical became the active ingredient in Roundup, a broad-spectrum, post-emergence herbicide. Franz earned acclaim and rewards for this breakthrough. He also had over 840 patents to his name worldwide.

== Career ==
Franz spent his entire career at Monsanto in St. Louis, Missouri. After finishing his Ph.D., Franz was hired by Monsanto as a Resident Chemist in 1955. He focused on process research, new polymer synthesis, and the development of plasticizers and polymer flame retardants. Franz received two patents while working in the Organic Division, one for nitrates in 1960, and one for a fire retardant in 1967. He transferred to the Agricultural Division of Monsanto in 1967, motivated by the department's "emphasis on publishing, academic contacts, and the freedom to pursue ideas." Because his background was in organic chemistry, Franz familiarized himself with the new field by spending a year studying and learning about plant physiology and biochemistry before beginning research.

He discovered the herbicide glyphosate, and received five dollars for his first patent from Monsanto. From 1960 to 1988, he received over 840 patents worldwide, including approximately fifty in the United States. Over the course of his career, Franz published over forty papers and wrote the book Glyphosate: A Unique Global Herbicide with Michael K. Mao and James A. Sikorski. He was promoted to Senior Scientific Fellow in 1975, then Distinguished Fellow in 1980. Later in his career, he returned to the organic division to concentrate on environmentally friendly products until he retired in 1991.

=== Discovery of glyphosate ===
Researchers at Monsanto had been searching for an herbicide that was effective against annual and perennial weeds for nine years but found little success. They knew of two phosphonic acid compounds that were ineffective against weeds, and the researchers were not able to advance the compounds. Franz took over the research in 1969 and incorrectly hypothesized that the phosphonic acids acted as proherbicides that were metabolized to active compounds rather than herbicides. Franz and his research team screened possible metabolites and synthesized compounds and eventually discovered glyphosate in 1970.

Although all of the patents regarding glyphosate list Franz as the sole inventor and the Monsanto Company as the assignee, Franz acknowledged that the discovery was a group effort. In 2007, when he was inducted into the National Inventor's Hall of Fame, Franz said, "It's a recognition of the entire team of scientists who worked on and supported the development of Roundup herbicides". Glyphosate works by absorption through leaves, and then moving rapidly to a plant's roots, rhizomes, and meristems. This breakthrough spurred Monsanto to design and produce plants genetically immune to glyphosates in order to make it easier for farmers to thoroughly spray down their fields for weeds without killing their own crops.

Once glyphosate was invented, it took four years to reach the market. It was first introduced as "Roundup", and is still best known by that brand.

Glyphosate has been called by experts in herbicides "virtually ideal" due to its broad spectrum and low toxicity compared with other herbicides. However, the chemical’s use has come under attack in numerous countries, with bans or partial bans enacted, and thousands of lawsuits filed alleging the chemical is carcinogenic. German Chancellor Angela Merkel stated in June 2019 that “we will come to a point where glyphosate isn’t used anymore.” Bayer, which acquired Monsanto, stopped selling Roundup for residential use in 2023 "exclusively to manage litigation risk and not because of any safety concerns".

=== Other research ===
Franz undertook research in many areas during his time at Monsanto. Some of his other chemistry research includes antiauxin chemistry (isothiazoles, isoxazoles, pyrazoles), plant chemistry, cell membrane chemistry (glyceride and phospholipid syntheses, liposomes), plant hormone chemistry (abscisic acid analogs, ethylene generators), and nitride sulfide chemistry. He also performed research pertaining to reaction mechanisms, coenzyme A antimetabolites, biorational design of herbicides, and periselective addition reactions of one- and threedipoles, as well as fundamental organic research.

== Death ==
Franz died on April 27, 2026, at the age of 96.

== Honors ==
Franz received awards for his discovery. In 1977, he was awarded the IR-100 award by Industrial Research magazine. In 1981, he received the first J.F. Queeny Award from Monsanto to honor an invention that was also a commercial success. He was the recipient of the 1987 National Medal of Technology, one of the few agricultural technologies to ever receive the honor. Franz received the American Chemical Society’s Carothers Award in 1989 for "outstanding contributions and advances in industrial applications of chemistry". In 1990, he was awarded the Perkin Medal by the American Section of the Society of Chemical Industry, based on his contributions to the research and development of applied chemistry. Franz also won the Outstanding Achievement Award in 1988, the 1988 Missouri Award, and was named the St. Louis Metropolitan Bar Association Inventor of the Year in 1986. Roundup was named one of the "Top 10 Products That Changed the Face of Agriculture" by the magazine Farm Chemicals in 1994. Franz was inducted into the United States' Inventor's Hall of Fame on May 5, 2007.

Monsanto has also created two awards in his honor. On December 8, 1995, the agricultural company introduced the Franz Sustainability Award, which consists of an annual $100,000 prize given to the individual or team that submits the best environmental project for improvement in the areas of conservation, technology, and/or education. Soon after Franz's induction into the Inventors' Hall of Fame in 2007, Monsanto announced a new annual scholarship called the Franz Innovation Award Scholarship. This scholarship is awarded each year to a graduate student taking organic chemistry at the University of Minnesota.

== Patents ==
Franz had over 840 patents to his name concerning glyphosate and lesser known discoveries. Because of the nature of glyphosate, it requires many patents concerning identification, synthesis, and other processes required to produce the chemical.

His patents include:

- Patent Number: 3799758, Phytotoxicant compositions
- Patent Number: 3853530, Regulating plants with n-phosphonomethylglycine and derivatives thereof
- Patent Number: 3977860, Herbicidal compositions and methods employing esters of
- Patent Number: 3954848, Process for producing N-phosphonomethy glycine
- Patent Number: 4735649, Gametocides
- Patent Number: 4634788, Herbicidal glyphosate oxime derivatives
- Patent Number: 4094661, Plant Growth Regulators
