= POEA =

POEA may refer to:

- Polyethoxylated tallow amine
- Philippine Overseas Employment Administration
