= Grievous Bodily Harm (disambiguation) =

Grievous Bodily Harm is a 1988 Australian crime film.

Grievous Bodily Harm may also refer to:

- Grievous bodily harm, a term used in English criminal law
- "Grievous Bodily Harm" (Lie to Me), a 2009 television episode

== See also ==
- GBH (disambiguation)
- Bodily Harm (disambiguation)
