= Johnson v. Monsanto Co. =

2018 court case in California, United States

Johnson v. Monsanto Co. was the first lawsuit to proceed to trial over Monsanto's Roundup herbicide products causing cancer. The lawsuit alleged that Roundup products caused Dewayne "Lee" Johnson's non-Hodgkin lymphoma and that Monsanto failed to warn consumers that Roundup products were potentially carcinogenic. In a landmark verdict, Monsanto's purchaser Bayer Corporation was ordered by a San Francisco jury to pay $289m in punitive damages and compensatory damages. Monsanto, and after June 2018 Bayer, appealed the verdict several times. The award was cut to $78 million, then reduced to $21 million after appeal.

== Background ==
Dewayne "Lee" Johnson, the plaintiff in this case, sprayed hundreds of gallons of Roundup over the course of his career as a school groundskeeper in Benicia, California. On one occasion, one of the sprayers he was using broke and he was drenched in Roundup. In 2014 at age 42, Johnson was diagnosed with non-Hodgkin lymphoma, which he alleged at trial was caused by the herbicide exposure. In 2017, he was given a terminal diagnosis and was told that he would only live another 6 months. Due to this diagnosis, his trial was expedited.

== Court findings ==
The central factual disputes in Johnson v. Monsanto Co. concerned whether Monsanto's glyphosate-based Roundup herbicides were capable of causing non-Hodgkin lymphoma, whether Johnson's exposure to the products was a substantial factor in causing his cancer, whether Monsanto knew or should have known of the alleged cancer risk, and whether the company failed to provide adequate warnings despite that knowledge. Following testimony from competing scientific experts and the introduction of internal Monsanto documents, the jury found in Johnson's favor on all major factual issues. It concluded that Roundup products were a substantial factor in causing Johnson's non-Hodgkin lymphoma, that the products' carcinogenic risks were known or knowable in light of prevailing scientific knowledge, and that Monsanto failed to provide adequate warnings. On appeal, the California Court of Appeal held that substantial evidence supported these factual findings and upheld the liability verdict, although it reduced the compensatory and punitive awards on legal grounds unrelated to the jury's factual determinations.

In June 2026, the United States Supreme Court ruled in Monsanto Co. v. Durnell that states cannot overrule federal labeling requirements about the possible carcinogenicity of Roundup. This ruling has called into question state-specific cancer warnings like the one in California that prohibits "failure-to-warn".

== In popular culture ==
The lawsuit is the subject of an upcoming Netflix legal drama directed by John Lee Hancock. It was also the subject of Into the Weeds, a Canadian Broadcasting Corporation documentary directed by Jennifer Baichwal. Into the Weeds was screened for a single day across the U.S. on October 3, 2023.

== See also ==
- Monsanto legal cases
