= Canadian House of Commons Standing Committee on Health =

Standing committee of the House of Commons of Canada

The House of Commons Standing Committee on Health (HESA) is a standing committee of the House of Commons of Canada.

== Mandate ==
- The mandate and management of Health Canada and its internal bodies:
  - Pest Management Regulatory Agency
- Oversight of other agencies reporting through the Minister of Health to the Parliament of Canada
  - Canadian Institutes of Health Research
  - Patented Medicine Prices Review Board
  - Public Health Agency of Canada
  - Canadian Food Inspection Agency

== Membership ==
As of the 45th Canadian Parliament:

Party	Member	Riding
Liberal	Hedy Fry, chair	Vancouver Centre, BC
Conservative	Dan Mazier, vice chair	Riding Mountain, MB
Bloc Québécois	Luc Thériault, vice chair	Montcalm, QC
Conservative	Burton Bailey	Red Deer, AB
Liberal	Maggie Chi	Don Valley North, ON
Liberal	Doug Eyolfson	Winnipeg West, MB
Liberal	Helena Jaczek	Markham—Stouffville, ON
Conservative	Helena Konanz	Similkameen—South Okanagan—West Kootenay, BC
Liberal	Sonia Sidhu	Brampton South, ON
Conservative	Matt Strauss	Kitchener South-Hespeler, ON
Source: House of Commons of Canada

== Subcommittees ==
- Subcommittee on Agenda and Procedure (SHES)
- Subcommittee on Sports-Related Concussions in Canada (SCSC)
