= N-Nitrosoglyphosate =

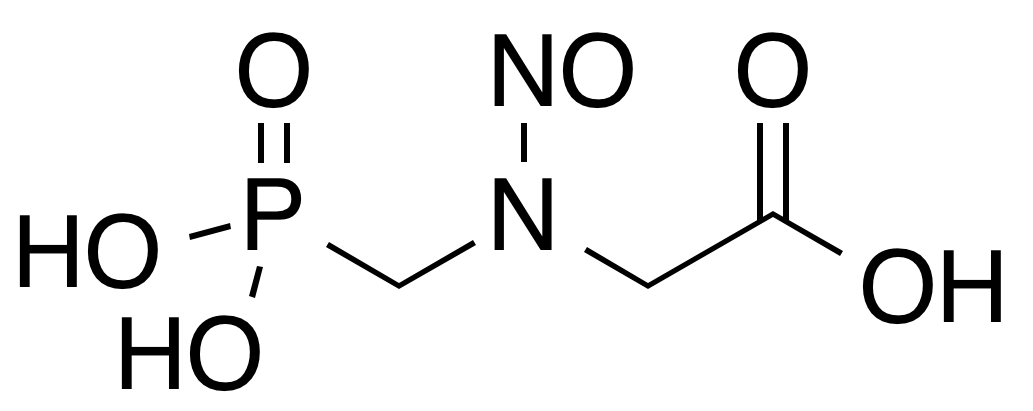

Names
- IUPAC name N-Nitroso-N-(phosphonomethyl)glycine
- Systematic IUPAC name [Nitroso(phosphonomethyl)amino]acetic acid
- Other names Nitrosoglyphosate, 56516-72-4, N-Nitrosoglyphosphate, 2-[nitroso(phosphonomethyl)amino]acetic acid, NNG

Identifiers
CAS Number	56516-72-4
3D model (JSmol)	Interactive image
ChEMBL	ChEMBL96010
ChemSpider	38242
PubChem CID	41910
UNII	2HME3JQ5MM
CompTox Dashboard (EPA)	DTXSID30205066
- InChI: InChI=1S/C3H7N2O6P/c6-3(7)1-5(4-8)2-12(9,10)11/h1-2H2,(H,6,7)(H2,9,10,11) Key: BJYYBQPCMQGLLZ-UHFFFAOYSA-N
- SMILES: C(C(=O)O)N(CP(=O)(O)O)N=O

Properties
Chemical formula	C_{3}H_{7}N_{2}O_{6}P
Molar mass	198.071 g·mol^{−1}
- Except where otherwise noted, data are given for materials in their standard state (at 25 °C [77 °F], 100 kPa). Infobox references

N-Nitrosoglyphosate is the nitrosamine degradation product and synthetic impurity of glyphosate herbicide.

The US EPA limits N-nitrosoglyphosate impurity to a maximum of 1 ppm in glyphosate formulated products. N-Nitrosoglyphosate can also form from the reaction of nitrates and glyphosate. Formation of N-nitrosoglyphosate has been observed in soils treated with sodium nitrite and glyphosate at elevated levels, though formation in soil is not expected at under typical field conditions.
