= Bodily Harm =

Bodily Harm may refer to:

- Bodily harm, legal jargon used in the definition of both statutory and common law offences
- Bodily Harm (novel), a 1981 novel by Margaret Atwood
- Bodily Harm (film), a 1995 film by James Lemmo
- Bodily Harm, a 2002 TV mini-series by Joe Wright

== See also ==
- Grievous Bodily Harm (disambiguation)
