= GHB (disambiguation) =

GHB or gamma-hydroxybutyric acid is a naturally occurring neurotransmitter and a psychoactive drug.

GHB may also refer to:

- GHB Records, an American record label
- Great Highland bagpipe, the Scottish national musical instrument
- Gabo d'Hirutho d'Bethnahrin, Assyrian-Syriac party
- Gerakan Harapan Baru, a political movement in Malaysia
- Governor's Harbour Airport's IATA code
- Good Humor-Breyers, Unilever's American ice cream division
- Trackpoint, the pointing device between G, H and B keys on some laptops
