= GBH (design and advertising agency) =

- Industry: Advertising agency
- Founded: 1999
- Founder: Jason Gregory; Mark Bonner; Peter Hale
- Headquarters: London
- Services: graphic design identity print packaging digital retail environment advertising

GBH (Gregory Bonner Hale) is a London-based design and advertising agency founded in 1999 by Jason Gregory, Mark Bonner and Peter Hale. The studio's proposition is that it 'is not Design, it is not Digital and it is not Campaign, but it works in the space between these disciplines, fusing crafts in order to make work that cuts through'.

== Publishing ==
GBH published the book Charm, Belligerence & Perversity: The Incomplete works of GBH (ISBN 1-9104-3390-X) in 2017 with Black Dog Publishing. The book attempts to convey what it takes to run a creative studio to young creatives and showcases the studio's 20-year output.

== Awards ==
In 2011, GBH was ranked No. 1 Design Agency worldwide according to the now defunct 'Pencil Rankings', a collaboration between Design & Advertising Award and Education charity, D&AD and The One Show, In New York. In 2012, GBH was ranked 2nd in the UK Top 50 Creative Survey, an annual industry ranking based on three schemes: D&AD awards, Design Week awards and the Creative Review annual.

== Clients ==
GBH creates work in graphic design, identity, print, packaging, digital, retail, environment, advertising and online. It has worked with brands such as Apple, America's Cup Event Authority, BMW, Puma, Flos, Eurostar, Hummel, Mama Shelter, Mob Hotel, Miss Ko, Yotel, Royal Mail, Samuels & Associates and Virgin Galactic.

The agency frequently collaborates with French designer Philippe Starck, including a 2005 project with Virgin for the Virgin Galactic company brand identity. GBH's work with Puma's brand identity encompasses more than 550 projects since 2003 and has helped the agency to win a D&AD Yellow Pencil in 2004 and three more Yellow Pencils in 2011, as well as a 2012 Design Week award.

== D&AD ==
GBH Founder and co-Creative Director, Mark Bonner was D&AD's 52nd President in 2015.
