= Pest Management Regulatory Agency =

Canadian government agency

The Pest Management Regulatory Agency (PMRA) is the Canadian government agency responsible for the regulation of pest control products in Canada under the federal authority of the Pest Control Products Act and Regulations. The agency is a branch that reports to Parliament through Health Canada. The PMRA is responsible for providing access to pest management tools while minimizing the risks to human health and the environment by “using modern evidence-based scientific approaches to pesticide regulation, in an open and transparent manner”. Their main activity areas include: new product evaluation, post market review and compliance and enforcement.

The PMRA works with provincial, territorial and federal departments in Canada to help refine and strengthen pesticide regulation across the country. Outside of Canada, the Agency works closely with international organizations such as the United States Environmental Protection Agency (EPA), the North American Free Trade Agreement Technical Working Group, the European Union, and the Organisation for Economic Co-operation and Development (OECD). They work to align the processes used to regulate pest control products and uphold the protection of health and the environment.

As of April 2017, the agency has approximately 400 employees. Over 75% of PMRA’s employees are scientists, with specializations in toxicology, environmental science, biology and chemistry. Other employees include policy, regulations, communications and administration. The PMRA's headquarters is in the Sir Charles Tupper Building in Ottawa, ON.

== History ==
In 1990, the Pesticides Registration Review Team was tasked with developing recommendations to improve the federal pesticide regulatory system. The Review Team consulted with Canadians across the country proposing a major reform to the federal pest management regulatory system. Proposed reforms from the Review Team were to establish a multi-stakeholder advisory council and the federal/provincial/territorial committee. Furthermore to increase public participation they recommended providing access to information on regulatory decisions with the intention of increasing openness and transparency. Additional suggestions to improve operation included:

- The use of a risk management approach
- Labeling provisions for safe use
- Re-evaluation of older pesticides and special reviews that may result from new information
- Data protection policy
- A cost recovery scheme
- Mandatory incident reporting
- Compliance and enforcement strategies and provisions

The Canadian government provided a response in 1994 recognizing the principles of environmental sustainability: to protect human health, safety and the environment by minimizing the risks associated with pesticides all while enabling access to pest control products and pest management strategies. The goals listed above helped work to set up the agency’s mandate.

In 1995, the formation of the Pest Management Regulatory Agency was approved with the purpose of consolidating the resources and responsibilities for pest management regulation. Staff and resources were consolidated from several federal departments — Agriculture and Agri-Food Canada, Environment Canada, Natural Resources Canada, Fisheries and Oceans Canada and Health Canada — into a single branch under Health Canada. Although the other departments are no longer officially involved in the decision-making process, they support the work of the PMRA through research and monitoring activities in their respective fields of expertise. Subsequently, the administration of the Pest Control Products Act was transferred from the Minister of Agriculture and Agri-Food to the Minister of Health.

By 1998, the PMRA had set up policies for product evaluations in which additional protection was required for vulnerable sectors like children and pregnant women, and pesticide exposure from all sources had to be taken into account, including food and water. These policies were formalized when a new Pest Control Products Act was approved in 2002 and came into force on June 28, 2006, replacing the 35-year old Act. On 31 January 2008, the Review Panel Regulations were instituted, to administer sections 35 to 40 of the then-renewed Act. A statutory review of the Pest Control Products Act was held by the Health Committee of Parliament on 27 January 2015. Three witnesses from the Pest Management Regulatory Agency were called to speak on the legislation. Aucoin, the Executive Director of the PMRA, stressed the science based and OECD-collaborative nature of the review process.

== Organization ==
The PMRA is managed by an Executive Director who reports to the Deputy Minister of Health:

- Claire Franklin, 1995-2005
- Karen Dodds:, 2005-2008
- Richard Aucoin:, 2008-

Directorates

- Executive Director’s Office
- Registration Directorate
- Health Evaluation Directorate
- Environmental Assessment Directorate
- Value Assessment and Re-Evaluation Management Directorate
- Compliance, Laboratory Services and Regional Operations Directorate
- Policy, Communications and Regulatory Affairs Directorate
- Strategic Planning, Financial and Business Operations Division

== Related Legislation ==
The PMRA is responsible for administering the Pest Control Products Act (PCPA) and its associated regulations on behalf of the Minister of Health.

The PCPA and the Pest Control Products Regulations (PCPR) maintain that:

- No person manufactures, stores, displays, distributes, or uses any pest control product under unsafe conditions
- No person packages, labels, or advertises any pest control product in a manner that is false, misleading, or deceptive, or is likely to create a false impression about the pest control product
- No person sells or imports a pest control product unless it is registered

Other Acts which have an impact on pest management are the Pesticide Residue Compensation Act (PRCA) and the Food and Drugs Act (FDA). Additionally, the PMRA uses the Agriculture and Agri-Food Administrative Monetary Penalties Act and its associated regulations as an enforcement tool for the PCPA.

In addition, Health Canada maintains a lengthy list of Policies and Guidelines which must be observed by the Agency.

== Main Activities ==
The primary role of the PMRA is to determine if a proposed pest control product can be used safely when label directions are followed and if the product is effective for its intended use.

Under the Pest Control Products Act (PCPA) a “pest control product” is defined as:

(a) a product, an organism or a substance, including a product, an organism or a substance derived through biotechnology, that consists of its active ingredient, formulants and contaminants, and that is manufactured, represented, distributed or used as a means for directly or indirectly controlling, destroying, attracting or repelling a pest or for mitigating or preventing its injurious, noxious or troublesome effects;

(b) an active ingredient that is used to manufacture anything described in paragraph (a); or

(c) any other thing that is prescribed to be a pest control product.

=== New Product Evaluation ===
Before a product can be submitted for evaluation, the PMRA has over 200 types of mandated tests that developers must perform to verify that the end product does not pose unacceptable risks. The PMRA then uses the given data to perform independent assessments in accordance with the PCPA. A product will only be registered if there is sufficient scientific evidence to show it does not pose an unacceptable health or environmental risk and that it serves a useful purpose. In all cases the conditions of registration are specified, including label direction instructions, so that the product can be used safely.

=== Post Market Review ===
Re-evaluations are used to access any changes in data requirements and verify that the products comply with modern day standards. A re-evaluation must be initiated if 15 years have passed since the last major risk assessment. Re-evaluations can result in amendments to the use pattern, label statements, or classification of a product. However, if it is determined that the risks to human health or the environment are no longer acceptable, or that the product is without value for its intended purpose, the registration is cancelled.

Special reviews allow the PMRA to cancel or amend the registration of one or more registered pest control products without waiting for its scheduled re-evaluation. The special review of a product is initiated if there is reason to believe that risks may no longer acceptable based on new scientific information.

To continue to monitor for safety after products are registered, registrants are required to report pesticide sales volumes along with any incidents associated with their products. Under the PCPA, company reports include adverse human and environmental effects as well as new data. Product users and the public can also report incidents.

=== Compliance and Enforcement ===
Health Canada works to promote, monitor, and enforce pesticide compliance activities under the National Pesticides Compliance Program (NPCP). The program is administered jointly by the Pest Management Regulatory Agency and the Regulatory Operations and Enforcement Branch (ROEB) of Health Canada. The PMRA inspects reports of illegal pesticides or misuse through its network of regional officers. Additionally, laboratory scientists test pesticides to determine if they comply with the specifications for which registration was granted.

Violations of the PCPA or PCPR are responded to with appropriate compliance and enforcement measures.

These measures include:

- Encouraging voluntary removal of product by the distributor
- Seizing the product
- Refusing entry of the product into Canada
- Issuing a compliance order, warning or penalty
- Amending suspending or cancelling the product registration

== Risk Assessment Process ==
The PMRA applies science-based decision making to premarket and post market reviews. These reviews incorporate human health and environmental risk assessments, as well as value and product chemistry. A guidance document is regularly updated by the PMRA, and sources its approach with accepted international standards.

Through scientific evaluations the PMRA establishes standards of protection for human health and the environment. These evaluations consist of a risk-based approach which assesses hazardous properties and possible exposure. Risk is calculated by multiplying toxicity by exposure. Therefore, a pesticide with low toxicity and high exposure could pose a similar risk as a pesticide with high toxicity and low exposure. Built-in safety factors are designed to take into account the potential variability of response, both within the same species (e.g., adults versus children) and between species (e.g., animals versus humans). Additional risk mitigation and communication measures are put in place with more hazardous pesticides.

=== Health Evaluation ===
Toxicological evaluations identify the possible human health effects of pesticides and establish the levels at which humans can be exposed to products without any harm. The required studies are designed to assess the possible adverse health effects on a variety of species that may result from single, multiple or lifetime exposure from pesticides via various routes of exposure. Major studies include acute, short- and long-term toxicity; carcinogenicity; genetic, reproductive, and developmental toxicity; and teratology.

Occupational Exposure Assessments (OEA) are performed to determine how much exposure to a pesticide could occur in a typical day. When performing the assessments, scientists take into account the different ways people are exposed to pesticides. One consideration is the different exposures of those who work with pesticides (formulators, applicators, and farmers) versus bystanders (people working or living near where a pesticide is used). Another consideration is the different exposures at various ages (i.e. adults and children). The assessments are based on factors like routes and duration of exposure, the species tested in toxicity studies and the endpoint of toxicological concern. OEAs also include the effectiveness of personal protective equipment (PPE).

Dietary Exposure Assessments evaluates all possibilities in which a product could come in contact with food. The purpose of the evaluations is to set the maximum residue limits (MRLs) for pesticides on food, both domestic and imported, under the Food and Drugs Act. Dietary Risk Assessments (DRAs) are also carried out to assess the potential daily intake of pesticide residues from all possible food sources. DRAs take into account the distinctive eating patterns of infants, toddlers, children, adolescents and adults. Toxicological evaluations also help to set the Acceptable Daily Intake (ADI); the amount of a compound that can be consumed daily for a lifetime with no adverse effects.

=== Environmental Risk Assessment ===
The environmental risk posed by a pesticide is a function of its environmental fate and environmental toxicology. The environmental fate provides an indication of what will happen to the product once it enters the environment. Factors such as the behaviour of the product in soil, water and air, the potential for its uptake by plants and animals and the possibility of bioaccumulation are evaluated. During the environmental toxicology assessments, scientists examine the effects the product has on non-target terrestrial and aquatic species.

=== Value Assessment ===
The primary consideration in a value assessment is determining a product’s efficacy; put differently, ‘does it do what it is claimed to do’. The assessment helps certify that only products that make a positive contribution to pest management are registered; helping to protect users from deceptive claims regarding the effectiveness of pest control products. The product is evaluated based on its health, safety and environmental benefits along with its social and economic impact. Furthermore, value assessments are used to establish the lowest effective rate at which pesticides can be applied to minimize the risks to health and the environment.

=== Risk Mitigation ===
In addition to carrying out evaluations, recommendations on how to best mitigate risk are made during the risk assessment process. Based on the information gathered during the above-mentioned assessments, risk management strategies are explored to see if any are available that might sufficiently mitigate the determined risk. Evaluators must decide if risk management strategies are necessary to mitigate environmental or health risks. Mitigation options reduce exposure; examples include protective clothing for applicators, buffer zones to protect the environment, reduction of application rates, etc. Label statements outline the risk mitigation measures identified during the review process. All registered products must bear a label, which is a legal document that dictates the use instructions and safety precautions. During the re-evaluation process, interim mitigation measures such as rate reductions or use restrictions can be put in place to revise label instructions that are outdated or no longer supported.

== Service Fees ==
Approximately 30% of PMRA’s operating budget comes from cost recovery fees. This model realigns a portion of the costs of the product registration process from federal taxpayers to the private sector ensuring there is an appropriate cost-sharing balance.

Present day, fees and charges fall under the Pest Control Products Fees and Charges Regulations, pursuant to section 67 of the Pest Control Products Act. The regulations were published on February 22, 2017, and came into effect on April 1, 2017. They are adjusted annually to account for inflation.

As of 2018, individual fees can range from $80 to > $100, 000. Multiple fees may also apply to one application, therefore cost of a major new registration can be in the area of $400, 000.

== Controversies ==
Robert Arnason, a journalist at the time working The Western Producer, wrote in September 2015 an open letter to the PMRA that remarked the lack of transparency with respect to pesticide sales figures, which had ostensibly been legislated in 2006.

In April 2015, the PMRA announced that glyphosate was due for a periodic review, and asked for public submissions. Both the active ingredient glyphosate and its formulated products were considered during the re-evaluation. Some glyphosate products also contain POEAs, which function as surfactants. The product labels were revised to ensure that a limit of 20% POEA by weight is directed. As of April 2017, all registered glyphosate end-use products in Canada meet the 20% limit. By 2019, the labels will be changed to reflect the concerns of householders, addressing buffer zones and run-offs near aquatic zones. The statement "when used according to the label, products containing glyphosate are not a concern to human health and the environment" was explicitly made. The Seralini affair was noted in response to one (or several) complaint, and the agency explained its conduct with a link to its 25 October 2012 statement on Seralini. A report generated by the PMRA said that more than 25 million kilograms of glyphosate were sold in 2014.

In June 2017, a prothonotary in the Federal Court ruled in David Suzuki Foundation v. Canada (Health) that, in a review of the neonicotinoid clothianidin, Bayer CropScience "failed to satisfy the first branch of the Sierra Club test". The PMRA was dragged into court because they attempted to justify their ban on publication of Bayer's sensitive commercial information, which in the event, was found to be already in the public domain. In a stinging rebuke, it was held that the Applicants were "put to the expense of responding to the ever-changing nature of Bayer’s motion".
