= Pesticide adjuvant =

Pesticide enhancer

Pesticide adjuvants are chemicals applied alongside pesticides to enhance the effectiveness of the active ingredient. They are used together with the pesticide itself (i.e. the active ingredient) to produce the mixture (pesticide formulation) which is then applied. The adjuvants do not control or kill pests, but they improve such properties as spreading, penetration, droplet size or other characteristics. Over twenty different types of adjuvants are on the market, including surfactants, oils, compatibility agents, buffering and conditioning agents, defoaming agents, deposition agents, drift control agents, and thickeners.

Adjuvants may be part of an already formulated pesticide as purchased (in-can adjuvants), or may be added separately when the spray solution is being prepared (tank mix adjuvant). Nearly all pesticides are sold by the manufacturers already formulated, and this formulation is effective, but not for all applications. Those applications may then profit from an in-tank adjuvant.

Annual worldwide adjuvant sales are estimated to be worth more than $1.5 billion, most of which is used by manufacturers in-can.

The use-rate on the pesticide label is mandatory by law. If an adjuvant improves the effectiveness of a pesticide, so that the farmer feels confident in spraying a lower amount, this is only legally allowed if the information on the pesticide label allows it.

== Regulation ==
In the United States, adjuvants are essentially unregulated except in a few isolated cases. The states of Washington and California require that adjuvants be registered before they can be sold. Other states may or may not regulate adjuvants at some level. There is no federal regulation of tank mix adjuvants.

However, the industry itself has several efforts underway in order to self regulate the products. The ASTM International (ASTM) E35.22 committee is the committee that defines agricultural tank mix claims for the industry. The standard E1519 defines the various claims that an adjuvant may make and reference the methods by which the claim may be proven. The methods are tests, which when applied to a given sample, prove that the material meets the claimed standard.

Supporting the activities of ASTM is the Council of Producers & Distributors of Agrotechnology (CPDA), an organization of inert (or other) ingredient and adjuvant manufacturers. CPDA offers participating companies the ability to self-certify their spray adjuvant products in the US by creating certain minimum standards that must be met in order to receive the CPDA stamp of certification.

In Canada, adjuvants are regulated by the Pest Management Regulatory Agency (PMRA) section of Health Canada. Each adjuvant must be tested and be proven to be safe and effective with every active ingredient with which it will be used. This much more stringent requirement prevents both the widespread use and questionable content present in the United States.

In the UK, the Chemical Regulations Directorate (CRD), part of the Health and Safety Executive, oversees the use of adjuvants. CRD defines an adjuvant as a substance other than water which is not in itself a pesticide but which enhances or is intended to enhance the effectiveness of the pesticide with which it is used. Adjuvants for use with agricultural pesticides have been categorised as extenders, wetting agents, sticking agents and fogging agents.
