= Polyethoxylated tallow amine =

Range of non-ionic surfactants derived from animal fats

General structure (R is the hydrocarbon chain of a fatty acid)

Polyethoxylated tallow amine (also polyoxyethylene tallowamine, POE-tallowamine) refers to a range of non-ionic surfactants derived from animal fats, or tallow. They are a class of polyethoxylated amines (POEAs). The abbreviation 'POEA' is often erroneously used to refer to POE-tallowamine. They are used primarily as emulsifiers and wetting agents for agrochemical formulations, such as pesticides (e.g. glyphosate).

== Synthesis ==
Animal fat is hydrolysed to give a mixture of free fatty acids, typically oleic (37–43%), palmitic (24–32%), stearic (20–25%), myristic (3–6%), and linoleic (2–3%). These are then converted to fatty amines via the nitrile process before being ethoxylated with ethylene oxide; this makes them water-soluble and amphiphilic. The length of the fatty tail and degree of exothylation will determine the overall properties of the surfactant.

== Composition and use ==
The polyethoxylated tallow amine used as a surfactant is referred to in the literature as MON 0139 or polyoxyethyleneamine (POEA). It is contained in the herbicide Roundup. An ethoxylated tallow amine (CAS No. 61791-26-2), is on the United States Environmental Protection Agency List 3 of Inert Ingredients of Pesticides."

Roundup Pro is a formulation of glyphosate that contains a "phosphate ester neutralized polyethoxylated tallow amine" surfactant; as of 1997 there was no published information regarding the chemical differences between the surfactant in Roundup and Roundup Pro.

POEA concentrations range from <1% in ready-to-use glyphosate formulations to 21% in concentrates. POEA constitutes 15% of Roundup formulations and the phosphate ester neutralized polyethoxylated tallow amine surfactant constitutes 14.5% of Roundup Pro.

Surfactants are added to glyphosate to allow effective uptake of water-soluble glyphosate across plant cuticles, which are hydrophobic, and reduces the amount of glyphosate washed off plants by rain.

== In the environment ==
POEA strongly adsorbs so that it is bound to soil and other particulates, which reduces exposure to aquatic or soil-dwelling organisms. This also makes it difficult to measure POEA in the environment. In laboratory experiments, POEA has a half-life in soils of less than 7 days. Washout from soil is minimal, and the estimated half-life in bodies of water is about 2 weeks. Field experiments have shown that the half-life of POEA in shallow waters is about 13 hours, "further supporting the concept that any potential direct effects of formulated products on organisms in natural waters are likely to occur very shortly post-treatment rather than as a result of chronic or delayed toxicity."

POEA can be toxic to aquatic species like fish and amphibians. Like other surfactants, it can affect membrane transport and can often act as a general narcotic. While laboratory studies can show effects of glyphosate formulations with POEA on aquatic organisms, similar observations rarely occur in the field when instructions on the herbicide label are followed. In mixtures such as glyphosate-based herbicides, the low aquatic toxicity of glyphosate results in surfactants like POEA having a higher relative toxicity than the active ingredient. In the US during the 1980s and 1990s, glyphosate formulations intended for aquatic use, such as Rodeo, discontinued use of POEA. POEA-containing formulations at the time could result in potentially hazardous levels for aquatic organisms when applied to bodies of water, and surfactants generally are not needed for aquatic herbicide use. Aquatic organism exposure risk to terrestrial formulations with POEA may occur due to drift, agricultural runoff or temporary water pockets.

== Mammalian health effects ==
POEA is generally deemed safe for typical exposure to skin, though extended use of tallow products like POEA on skin may result in skin sensitivity. Depending on the route of exposure, concentrated POEA (e.g., 70% or higher) can cause mouth, skin, eye, and reproductive tissue irritation, though skin symptoms usually cease after 72 hours. Very large amounts consumed orally can produce gastrointestinal symptoms, possibly leading to death, but POEA generally does not affect other organs through this route of exposure. In mammals, POEA is not considered genotoxic and does not affect fetus development or reproduction.

A 2004 review said that with respect to glyphosate formulations, "experimental studies suggest that the toxicity of the surfactant, polyoxyethyleneamine (POEA), is greater than the toxicity of glyphosate alone and commercial formulations alone. There is insufficient evidence to conclude that glyphosate preparations containing POEA are more toxic than those containing alternative surfactants. Although surfactants probably contribute to the acute toxicity of glyphosate formulations, the weight of evidence is against surfactants potentiating the toxicity of glyphosate." A 2020 review found the risk from occupational exposure to POEA from applying herbicides is insignificant and "there are no significant human health issues associated with the use of POEA as a surfactant in formulations of glyphosate."
