= Michaelis =

Michaelis or Michelis is a surname. Notable people and characters with the surname include:

- Adolf Michaelis, German classical scholar
- Alice Michaelis, German painter
- Anthony R. Michaelis, German science writer
- Carolina Michaëlis de Vasconcelos, German-Portuguese romanist
- Christian Friedrich Michaelis, German doctor
- Christian Friedrich Michaelis (philosopher), German essayist and philosopher
- Edward Michelis, German theologian
- Georg Michaelis, German politician
- Gerasimos Michelis (1965–2025), Greek actor
- Gustav Adolf Michaelis, German obstetrician and namesake of the rhombus of Michaelis
- Hans-Thorald Michaelis, German historian
- Johann David Michaelis, German biblical scholar
- John H. Michaelis, American four-star general
- Laura Michaelis, American linguist
- Leo Michelis, Greek-Canadian economist
- Leonor Michaelis, German scientist known for Michaelis–Menten kinetics
- Max Michaelis, South African financier
- Margaret Michaelis-Sachs, Austrian-Australian photographer
- Paul Charles Michaelis, American scientist
- Peter Michaelis, German botanist
- Robert Michaelis (1878–1965), French-born actor and singer who settled in England
- Sebastian Michaelis, the demon butler from Kuroshitsuji
- Sebastien Michaelis, French inquisitor and writer of Michaelis' classification of demons
- Susanne Maria Michaelis, German linguist
- Vic Michaelis, American-Canadian comedian and actor

== See also ==
- De Michelis (disambiguation)
- Michaelis–Arbuzov reaction, a chemical reaction
- St. Michaelis, Hamburg
