= Metal phosphonate =

Type of metal-organic framework compound

Metal phosphonates are coordination compounds in which metal ions or metal clusters are coordinated by phosphonates. They are characterized by a highly flexible and complex structural chemistry. Porous metal phosphonates represent a subgroup of metal-organic framework compounds.

== Properties ==
=== Porous metal phosphonates ===
Compared to many carboxylate- or imidazolate-based MOFs, metal phosphonates typically exhibit high thermal, chemical, and mechanical stability. This stability is primarily attributed to strong metal–phosphonate bonds, as well as the high charge density and basicity of the deprotonated phosphonate groups. Exceptionally stable framework compounds can be formed, particularly with hard metal ions such as Ti(IV), Zr(IV), or Hf(IV).

The coordination modes of the phosphonate group are significantly more versatile than those of carboxylate groups. A single phosphonate group can coordinate up to eight metal centers via its three oxygen atoms. The specific binding mode depends on factors such as the degree of deprotonation, reaction temperature, the choice of metal ion, and any additional functional groups on the linker molecule. While this coordination flexibility drives the high structural diversity of metal phosphonates, it also complicates the targeted synthesis of crystalline and porous materials.

== Structural chemistry ==
Due to the thermodynamic stability of the M–O–P bond, metal phosphonates tend to form dense structures. Historically, initial syntheses utilizing mono- and diphosphonates predominantly yielded dense, layered structures.

Harris notation is frequently employed to describe the coordination modes of phosphonate groups. A descriptor of the form [M.O_{1}O_{2}O_{3}] indicates the total number of metal centers (M) coordinated by the oxygen atoms (O_{1}, O_{2}, and O_{3}) of a phosphonate group, as well as the number of metal ions bound to each individual oxygen atom.

Examples of Harris notation for phosphonate coordination modes, where R = alkyl or aliphatic radical.

=== Porous metal phosphonates ===
Porosity can be introduced via interlayer gaps, structural defects, mixed-linker systems, or the utilization of sterically demanding, rigid linkers. In particular, rigid, non-linear aromatic phosphonic acids can impede dense layer packing, thereby favoring more open framework structures.

== Synthesis ==
Metal phosphonates are typically synthesized in solution via hydrothermal or solvothermal synthesis. In this process, metal sources react with organic phosphonic acids or their precursors (phosphonates) at elevated temperatures, frequently within autoclaves or other sealed reaction vessels, and less commonly under reflux conditions. Crystallization is heavily dependent on kinetic and thermodynamic factors, particularly the strength of the metal–oxygen bond and the rate of ligand exchange. The synthesis of crystalline, porous metal phosphonates remains challenging because strong P–O–M interactions often result in rapid nucleation, poor crystallinity, or the formation of dense phases.

=== Phosphonic acids ===
Alkylphosphonic acids are prepared via the Arbuzov reaction. Alkyl phosphonates and α-halogenated phosphonates can be synthesized using the Michaelis-Becker reaction. For aromatic phosphonic acid linkers, the Hirao reaction, the Tavs reaction, and coupling strategies involving pre-phosphonated aromatics, such as the Suzuki coupling, are widely utilized. Typically, phosphonate esters are synthesized first and subsequently hydrolyzed to the corresponding phosphonic acids. Alternatively, phosphinic acids can be prepared and subsequently oxidized using hydrogen peroxide.

== History ==
Research on metal phosphonates was pioneered in 1978 by Alberti and Costantino et al., who prepared three zirconium phosphonates: zirconium phenylphosphonate, Zr(C_{6}H_{5}PO_{3})_{2}; zirconium hydroxymethylphosphonate, Zr(HOCH_{2}PO_{3})_{2}; and zirconium ethylphosphate, Zr(C_{2}H_{5}OPO_{3})_{2}.

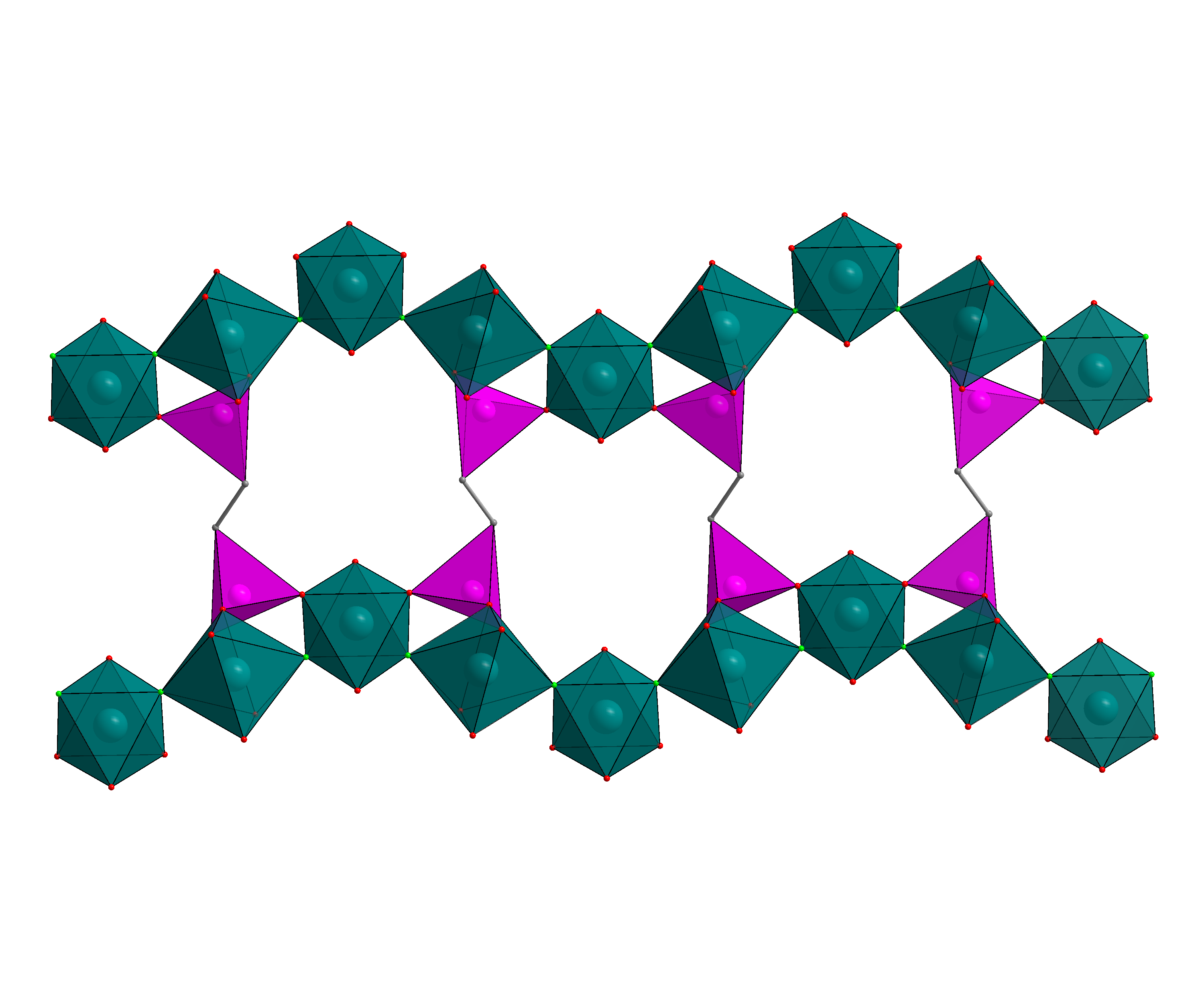
Section of the crystal structure of Al_{2}[O_{3}PC_{2}H_{4}PO_{3}](H_{2}O)_{2}F_{2}·H_{2}O along the a axis. It consists of chains of AlO_{4}F_{2} octahedra linked by ethylene diphosphonate units, forming a structure with pores parallel to the a axis.

While early work focused primarily on using simple phosphonic acids to synthesize new solid-state materials, research later expanded to diphosphonic acids of the general formula [(HO)_{2}OP^{−}R^{−}PO(OH)_{2}], where R represents an organic group of varying length and type. This enabled the synthesis of extended framework structures with one-, two-, and three-dimensional cross-linking. A primary objective was to specifically increase the porosity of these materials. Although many early metal diphosphonates featured channels whose size was determined by the length of the linker molecule, the distances between molecules were often very small (less than 5 Å), restricting access to the internal pore space for potential applications.

Various strategies were subsequently developed to enlarge these pore spaces.

- The first method, reported by Dines et al. in 1983, utilized a phosphate ester alongside the diphosphonic acid; porosity was introduced into the resulting material by hydrolyzing the phosphate ester to create voids.
- The second method involves the controlled topotactic substitution of a diphosphonate within a layered host.
- The third common method relies on forming the porous material through the co-precipitation of a metal species with the diphosphonic acid and a minor substituent, R-PO(OH)_{2}—such as phosphoric acid (R = OH), phosphorous acid (R = H), or methylphosphonic acid (R = CH_{3}). This methodology was employed by Alberti and Clearfield to prepare several microporous diphosphonates containing tetravalent or divalent metal ions, respectively.

A major advance was the extension of this synthetic chemistry to trivalent metal ions, particularly aluminum, by Maeda et al. in 1994 and Attfield et al. in 2000. Interest in open-framework aluminum phosphonates was stimulated by the discovery of two microporous aluminum methylphosphonates, AlMePO-α and AlMePO-β, described by Maeda et al. beginning in 1994. These two structures, which share the stoichiometry Al_{2}(MePO_{3}), are polymorphs and feature one-dimensional hexagonal channels with a diameter of 6 Å. In these structures, aluminum exhibits both tetrahedral and octahedral coordination.

Although early syntheses predominantly yielded dense metal phosphonates, the use of bulky, rigid, and sterically demanding linker molecules starting in the early 2000s enabled the generation of increasingly ordered microporosity.

== Literature ==
- Konstantinos D. Demadis, Phosphonate Chemistry, Technology, and Applications, 2025, Elsevier, ISBN 978-0-443-33374-3, DOI:10.1016/C2024-0-00017-3
