= Jakob Heinrich Hermann Schwartz =

German obstetrician and gynecologist

Jakob Heinrich Hermann Schwartz (3 November 1821 – 30 October 1890) was a German obstetrician and gynecologist. He was the father of classical philologist Eduard Schwartz (1858–1940).

Schwartz was born in Neuenkirchen, near Itzehoe. He studied medicine at the University of Halle under Peter Krukenberg and at the University of Kiel as a pupil of Bernhard von Langenbeck and Gustav Adolf Michaelis. In 1847 he received his medical doctorate at Kiel with the thesis "De neonatorum pemphigo". From 1848 to 1851 he served as a physician with the Schleswig-Holstein army, then afterwards returned to Kiel as an assistant to Carl Conrad Theodor Litzmann. In 1852 he obtained his habilitation for obstetrics, and in 1859 relocated to Marburg as a professor and director of the university Frauenklinik. In 1862 he succeeded Eduard Caspar Jacob von Siebold as director of the clinic for obstetrics and gynecology at the University of Göttingen. Here he remained up until his retirement in 1888, his replacement being Max Runge.

While working as a privatdozent at the University of Kiel he conducted important research on fetal respiration in utero, publishing the treatise "Die vorzeitigen Athembewegungen" (1858) as a result. In 1876 he performed the first ovariotomy using aseptic safeguards at the Göttingen Frauenklinik.

Schwartz died in Göttingen.

== Published works ==
- Die vorzeitigen Athembewegungen: Ein Beitrag Zur Lehre Von Den Einwirkungen Des Geburtsactes Auf Die Frucht (1858) – Early respiratory movements, a contribution to the study on the influence of labor upon the fetus.
- Beitrag zur Geschichte des Fötus in Fötu (1860) – Contribution to the history of the fetus in fetal growth.
- Jakob Heinrich Hermann Schwartz, der Frauenarzt 1821-1890, by Dietrich Tetzlaff (1949).
