= Eduard Caspar Jacob von Siebold =

German gynecolgist (1801–1861)

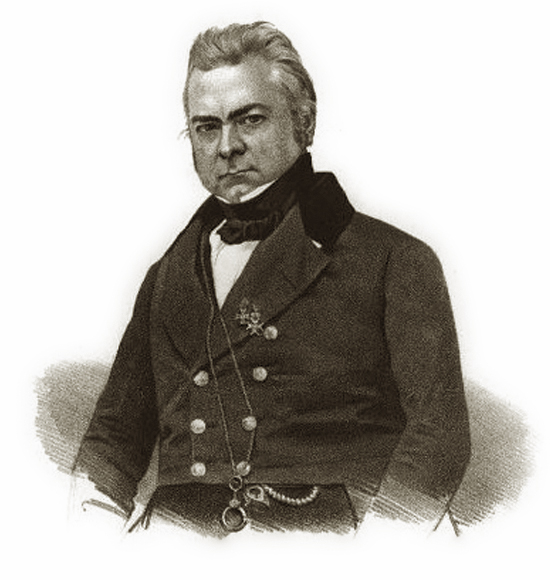
- Von Siebold, Humboldt University of Berlin, University Library
- Born: 19 March 1801; Würzburg, Prince-Bishopric of Würzburg
- Died: 27 October 1861 (aged 60); Göttingen, Electorate of Hanover
- Scientific career
- Fields: Gynecology, obstetrics
- Workplaces: Humboldt University of Berlin; University of Marburg; University of Göttingen

Eduard Caspar Jacob von Siebold (19 March 1801 – 27 October 1861) was a German professor of gynecology. He worked at Humboldt University of Berlin, University of Marburg and University of Göttingen.

== Life and career ==
Von Siebold was born 19 March 1801, the son of gynecologist Adam Elias von Siebold, in Würzburg, in the Prince-Bishopric of Würzburg (now Bavaria). He became a medical doctor in 1826, docent in obstetrics in 1827 in Berlin, and professor in this field in 1829 in Marburg. From 1833 until his death in 1861, he was director of the clinic for gynecology and obstetrics at University of Göttingen, succeeding Caspar Julius Mende. Von Siebold represented a traditional approach in obstetrics and did not embrace the great medical developments at the time.

He travelled to Wien in 1847, partly to reach consensus with the so-called modern Vienna School that emphasized active obstetrical intervention by doctors, partly to study the work of Johann Lucas Boër who represented a more conservative trend in obstetrics. There he met Ignaz Semmelweis whose theories he could not accept at all.

Inspired by the work of James Young Simpson, Von Siebold introduced the use of ether as a general anaesthetic and was the first to carry out a caesarian section using this substance.

Von Siebold died on 27 October 1861 in Göttingen. He was succeeded by Jakob Heinrich Hermann Schwartz, who was a student of Gustav Adolf Michaelis and an assistant under Carl Conrad Theodor Litzmann at the University of Kiel.

== Bibliography ==
- Versuch einer Geschichte der Geburtshülfe 1839, 1845
