= Perkow reaction =

Named after	Werner Perkow
Reaction type	Coupling reaction

Identifiers
RSC ontology ID	RXNO:0000183

The Perkow reaction is an organic reaction in which a trialkyl phosphite ester reacts with a haloketone to form a dialkyl vinyl phosphate and an alkyl halide.

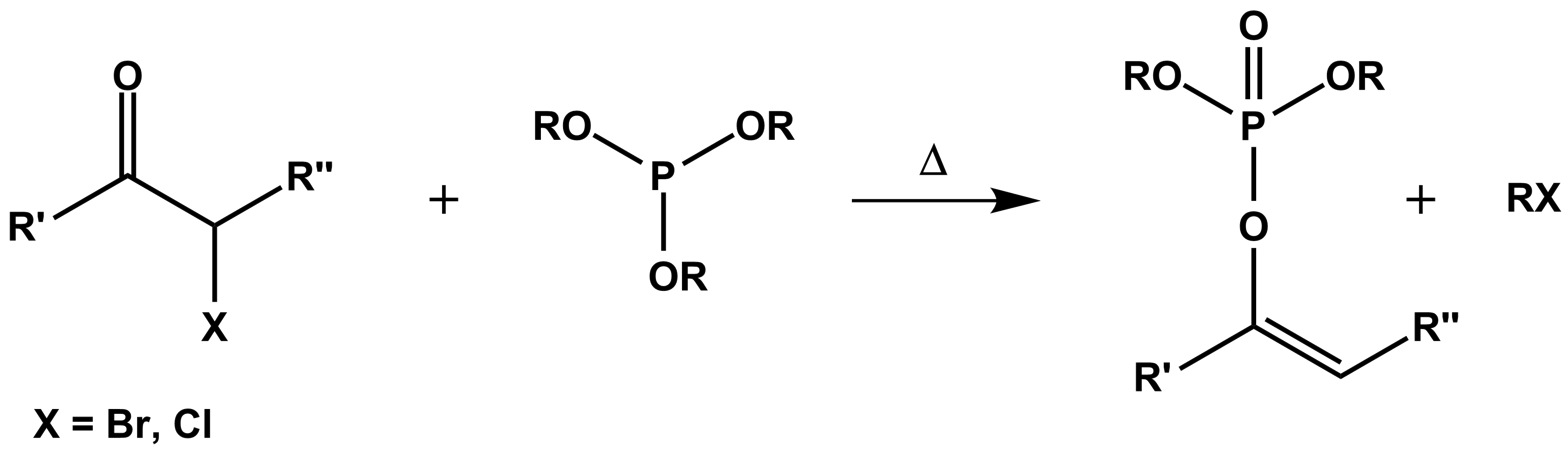
The Perkow reaction

In the related Michaelis–Arbuzov reaction the same reactants are known to form a beta-keto phosphonate which is an important reagent in the Horner–Wadsworth–Emmons reaction on the road to alkenes. The Perkow reaction, in this respect is considered a side-reaction.

== Reaction mechanism ==
The reaction mechanism of the Perkow reaction consists of a nucleophilic addition of the phosphite at the carbonyl carbon forming a zwitterionic intermediate. The zwitterionic intermediate rearranges to a cationic species while eliminating the halide. The cationic species then dealkylates through a second nucleophilic displacement in which the halide anion attacks one of the phosphite alkoxide substituents forming an enol phosphate.

Perkow reaction mechanism

== Scope ==
The Perkow reaction has been applied in the synthesis of an insect repellent based on hexachloroacetone and triethylphosphite which is able to engage in a secondary [4+3] cycloaddition with furan through the action of the base sodium 2,2,2-trifluoroethoxide. The authors report mediocre yields.

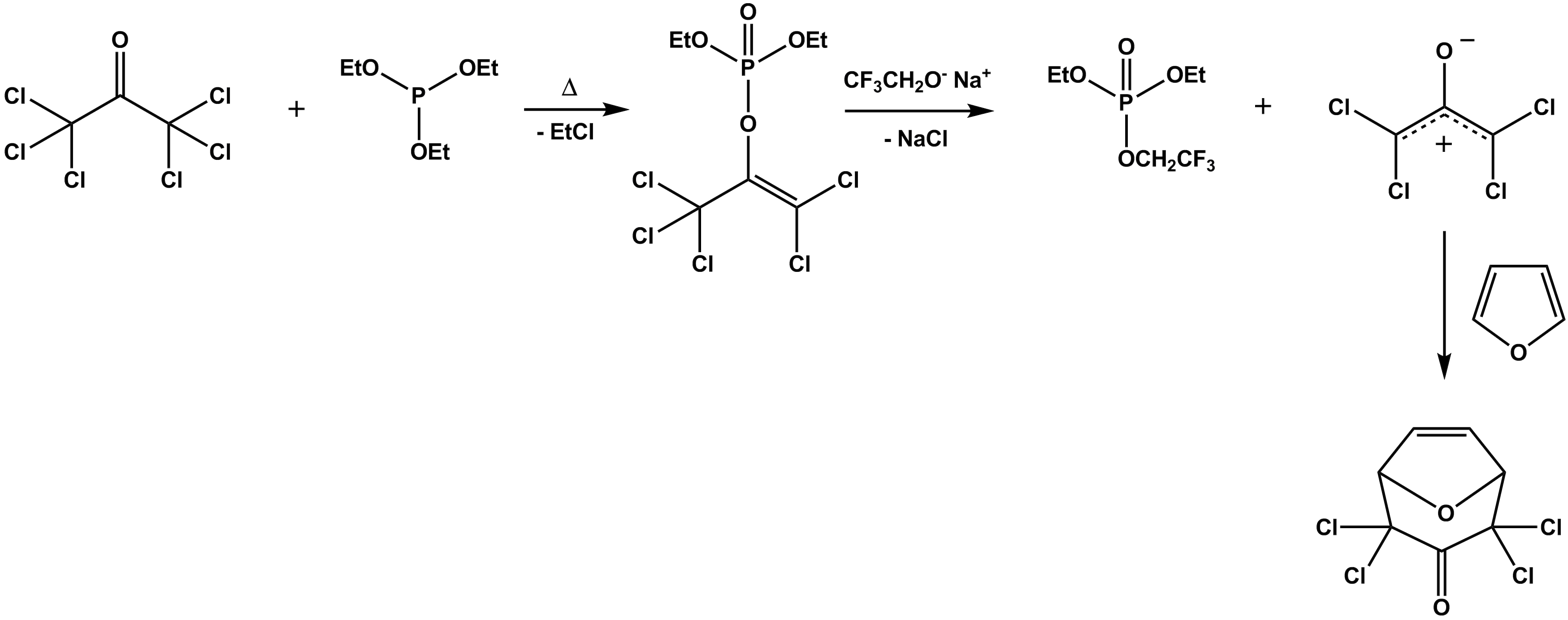
Perkow reaction hexachloroacetone triethylphosphine adduct

The Perkow reaction is also used in the synthesis of novel quinolines. When the substituent is n-butyl the reaction product is the classical Perkow adduct. In this reaction the leaving group is an electron deficient acyl group (owing to the presence of three fluorine groups). When the substituent on the other hand is phenyl (not shown) the phosphite has a preference for reaction with the acyl group leading to an ethyl enol ether. Key in explaining the difference in reactivity is the electron density on the α-keto carbon atom.

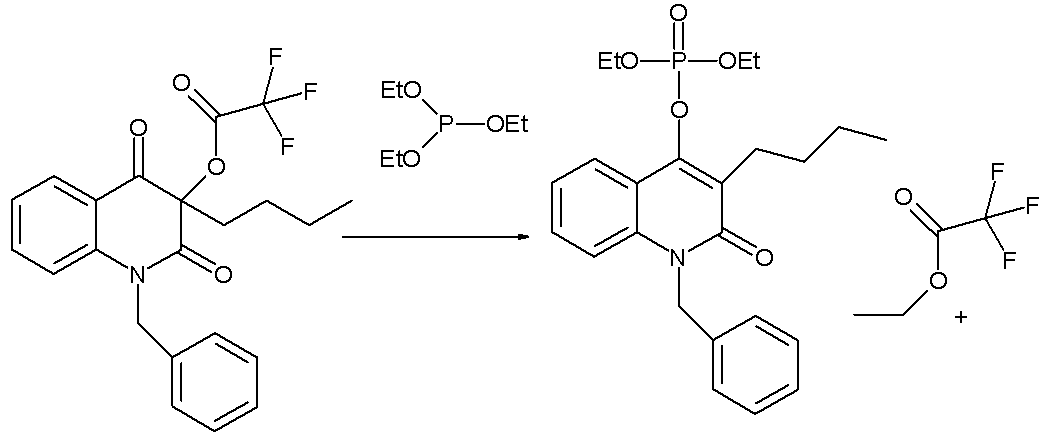
Perkow quinoline application

Aryl enol phosphates formed in good yields (ca. 90%) in the Perkow reaction can be used as phosphorylating reagents, e.g. able to transform AMP into ATP.
