= Phosphite ester =

Organic compound with the formula P(OR)3

The general structure of a phosphite ester showing the lone pairs on the P

In organic chemistry, a phosphite ester or organophosphite usually refers to an organophosphorous compound with the formula P(OR)_{3}. They can be considered as esters of an unobserved tautomer phosphorous acid, H_{3}PO_{3}, with the simplest example being trimethylphosphite, P(OCH_{3})_{3}. Some phosphites can be considered esters of the dominant tautomer of phosphorous acid (HP(O)(OH)_{2}). The simplest representative is dimethylphosphite with the formula HP(O)(OCH_{3})_{2}. Both classes of phosphites are usually colorless liquids.

== Synthesis ==
From PCl_{3}

Phosphite esters are typically prepared by treating phosphorus trichloride with an alcohol. For alkyl alcohols the displaced chloride ion can attack the phosphite, causing dealkylation to give a dialkylphosphite and an organochlorine compound. The overall reaction is as follows:

PCl_{3} + 3 C_{2}H_{5}OH → (C_{2}H_{5}O)_{2}P(O)H + 2 HCl + C_{2}H_{5}Cl

Alternatively, when the alcoholysis is conducted in the presence of proton acceptors (typically an amine base), one obtains the C_{3}-symmetric trialkyl derivatives:

PCl_{3} + 3 C_{2}H_{5}OH + 3 R_{3}N → (C_{2}H_{5}O)_{3}P + 3 R_{3}NHCl

A base is not essential when using aromatic alcohols such as phenols, as they are not susceptible to attack by chloride, however it does catalyse the esterification reaction and is therefore often included.

By transesterification

Phosphite esters can also be prepared by transesterification, as they undergo alcohol exchange upon heating with other alcohols. This process is reversible and can be used to produce mixed alkyl phosphites. Alternatively, if the phosphite of a volatile alcohol is used, such as trimethyl phosphite, then the by product (methanol) can be removed by distillation, allowing the reaction to be driven to completion.

== Reactions and applications of tris(organo)phosphites ==
=== Reactions ===
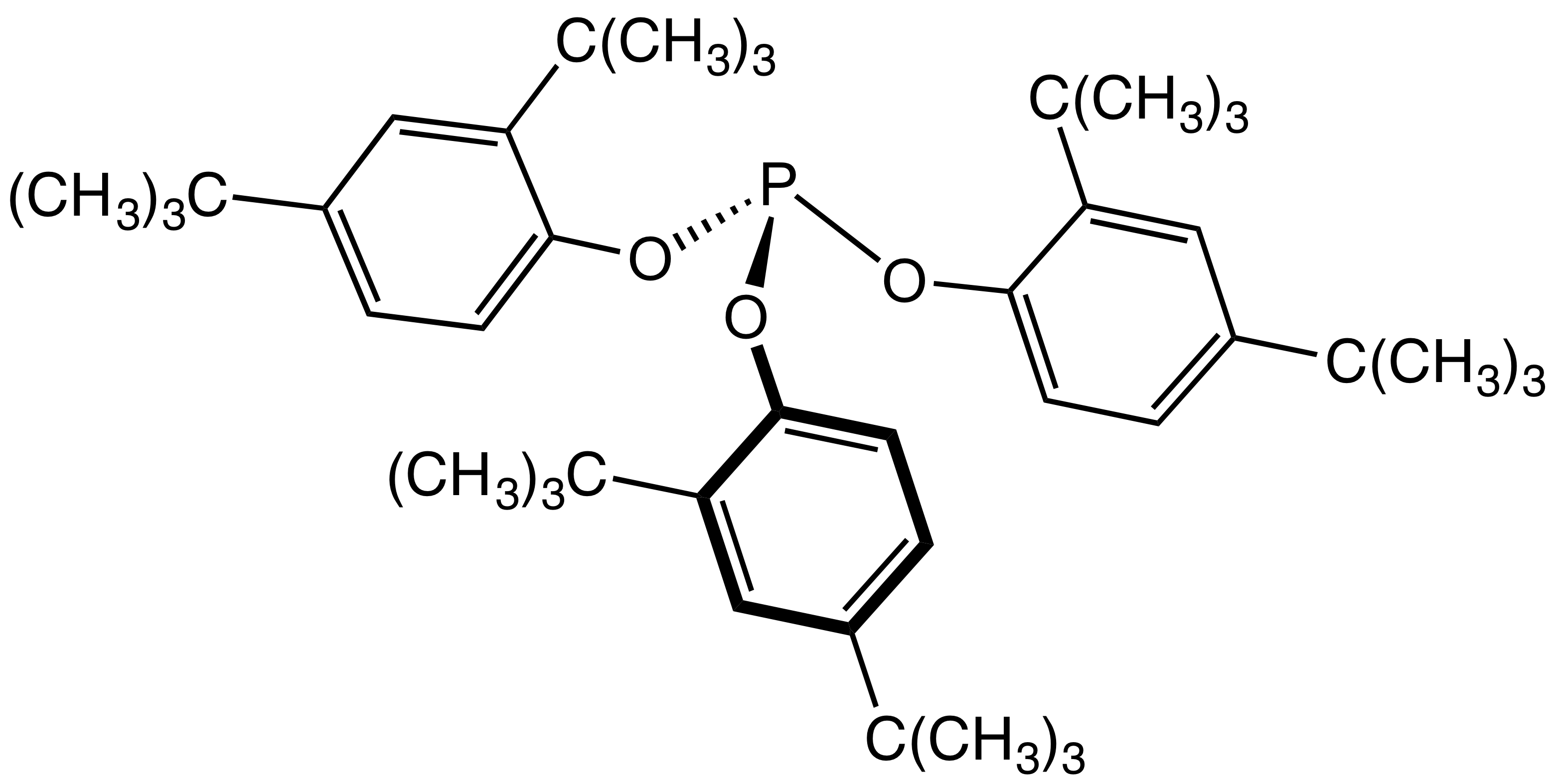
Tris(2,4-di-tert-butylphenyl)phosphite, a widely used stabilizer in polymers

Phosphites are oxidized to phosphate esters:

P(OR)_{3} + [O] → OP(OR)_{3}

This reaction underpins the commercial use of some phosphite esters as stabilizers in polymers.

Alkyl phosphite esters are used in the Perkow reaction for the formation of vinyl phosphonates, and in the Michaelis–Arbuzov reaction to form phosphonates. Aryl phosphite esters may not undergo these reactions and hence are commonly used as stabilizers in halogen-bearing polymers such as PVC.

Phosphite esters may be used as reducing agents in more specialised cases. For example, triethylphosphite is known to reduce certain hydroperoxides to alcohols formed by autoxidation:

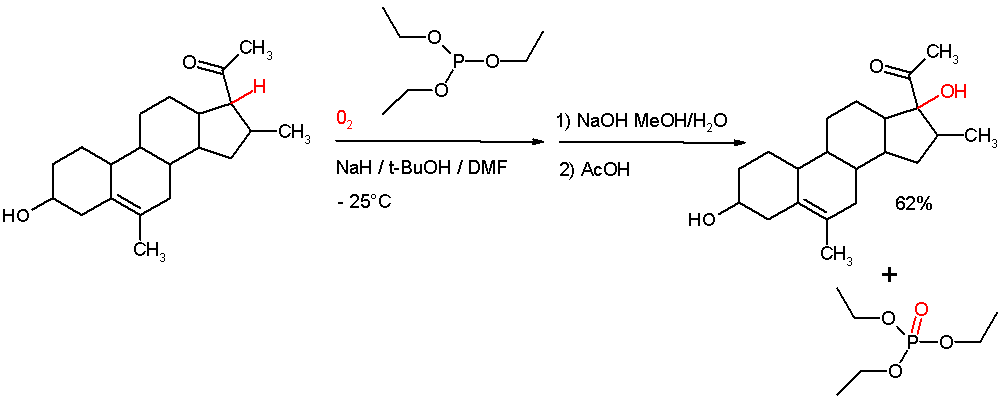
Autoxidation of a keto steroid with oxygen to the hydroperoxide (not depicted) followed by reduction with triethylphosphite to the alcohol

In this process the phosphite is converted to a phosphate ester. This reaction type is also utilized in the Wender Taxol total synthesis.

As strong nucleophiles, phosphite esters add to aldehydes in the Abramov reaction.

=== Homogeneous catalysis ===
BiPhePhos is representative diphosphite ligand used in homogeneous catalysis.

Phosphite esters are Lewis bases and hence can form coordination complexes with various metal ions. Representative phosphite ligands include trimethylphosphite ((MeO)_{3}P), triethylphosphite ((EtO)_{3}P), trimethylolpropane phosphite, and triphenylphosphite ((PhO)_{3}P). Phosphites exhibit a smaller ligand cone angles than the structurally related phosphine ligand family. Phosphite ligands are components of industrial catalysts for hydroformylation and hydrocyanation.

== Chemistry of HP(O)(OR)_{2} ==
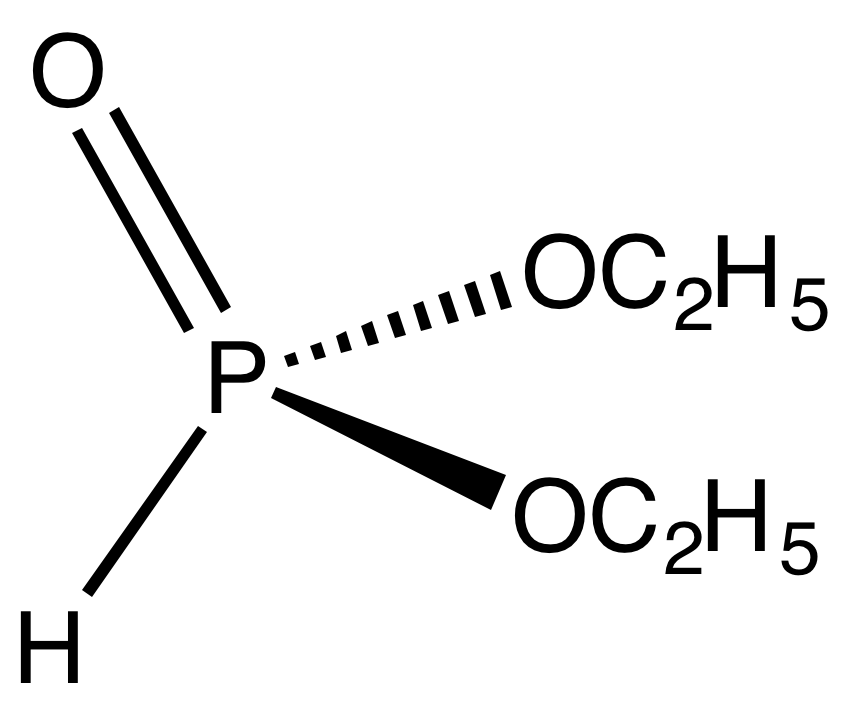
Structure of a diethylphosphite.

Diorganophosphites are derivatives of phosphorus(V) and can be viewed as the di-esters of phosphorous acid ((HO)_{2}P(O)H). They exhibit tautomerism, however, the equilibrium overwhelmingly favours the right-hand (phosphonate-like) form:

(RO)_{2}POH ⇌ (RO)_{2}P(O)H

The P-H bond is the site of high reactivity in these compounds (for example in the Atherton–Todd reaction and Hirao coupling), whereas in tri-organophosphites the lone pair on phosphorus is the site of high reactivity. Diorganophosphites do however undergo transesterification.

== See also ==
- Phosphinite P(OR)R_{2}
- Phosphonite P(OR)_{2}R
- Ortho ester CH(OR)_{3}
- Borate ester B(OR)_{3}
