= Karl Aurivillius =

Karl Aurivillius (2 August 1717 Stockholm – 19 January 1786 Uppsala) was a Swedish linguist, translator and orientalist.

== Education ==
At age twelve he began studying Arabic, and since then he also learned to read Persian, Turkish, and Georgian. He studied at Uppsala University and in Paris, Leiden and Halle. He became friends with the major contemporary Orientalists, as Michaelis, Etienne Fourmont and Albert Schultens.

== Career ==
Aurivillius was a master of the Syriac, Arabic, Sanskrit and oriental languages.

In 1747 he became associate professor of Greek and Oriental Languages at Uppsala. His thesis was on the USU dialect Arabica, and earned his doctorate in 1752 with a dissertation on Ibn al-Wardi cosmography. He was part of King Gustav III's Bible Commission and translated almost the entire Old Testament into Swedish.

He often worked as a translator for the government's diplomatic relations with the Orient and at the Office of Trade. For a time he worked to catalog Queen Lovisa Ulrika's Oriental manuscript collection. In 1754 he was appointed professor of poetry at Uppsala, and in 1772 Professor of Oriental Languages. With Linnaeus's resignation, he became in 1767 the permanent secretary of the Society of Sciences in Uppsala. From 1757 to 1786, Aurivillius was also inspector at Västgöta.

== Family ==
Aurivillius was the son of Charles XII's confessor, a superintendent named Magnus Petri Aurivillius (1673–1740) and Margareta Kristina von Numers (1694–1781). He descended through his father from the Bure dynasty.

Aurivillius married Eva Ulrika Ekerman (1733–1804) and had two children, Per Fabian Aurivillius (1756–1829) and Eva Maria Aurivillius (1758–1844). Their son Per Fabian Aurivillius became a famous librarian at Carolina Rediviva.

== Sources ==
- "Karl Aurivillius". The Jan Eurenius Database. rootsweb.ancestry.com.
