= August Michaelis =

German chemist (1847–1916)

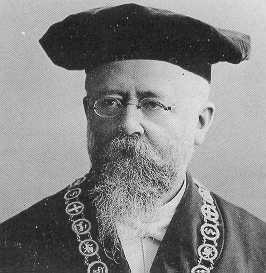
- Born: December 26, 1847; Bierbergen (now part of Hohenhameln), Germany
- Died: January 31, 1916 (aged 68); Rostock, German Empire
- Education: University of Göttingen; University of Jena
- Known for: Michaelis–Arbuzov reaction Michaelis–Becker reaction
- Scientific career
- Workplaces: University of Karlsruhe; University of Aachen; University of Rostock
- Doctoral advisor: Johann Georg Anton Geuther

August Michaelis (26 December 1847 – 31 January 1916) was a German chemist and discovered the Michaelis–Arbuzov reaction.

Michaelis studied at the University of Göttingen and University of Jena and became professor for chemistry at University of Karlsruhe in 1876, at the University of Aachen in 1880, and at the University of Rostock in 1890.

== Works ==
- Repetitorium und Examinatorium der Chemie . Laupp, Tübingen 1850 Digital edition by the University and State Library Düsseldorf
- Ausführliches Lehrbuch der anorganischen Chemie (in German). Vol. 1. Braunschweig: Vieweg und Sohn. 1878.
- Ausführliches Lehrbuch der anorganischen Chemie (in German). Vol. 4. Braunschweig: Vieweg und Sohn. 1889.
