= Triethyl phosphite =

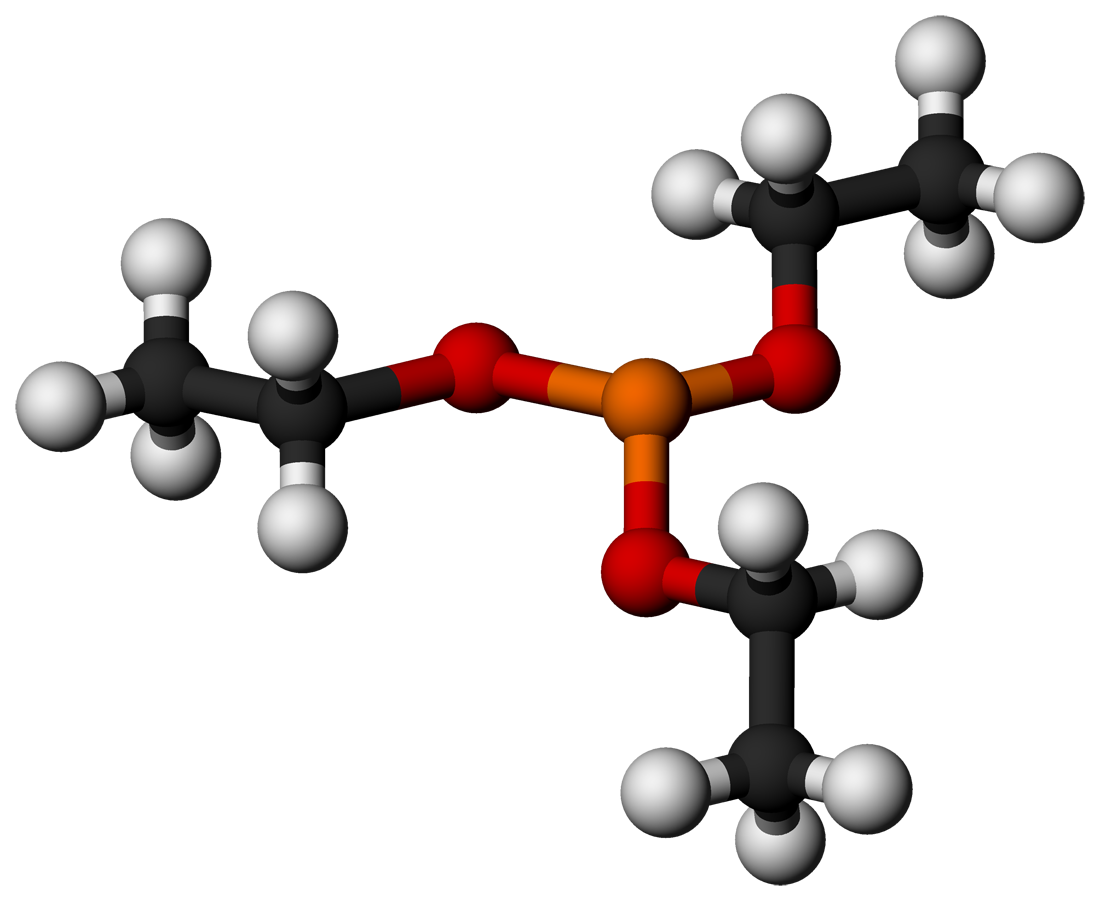

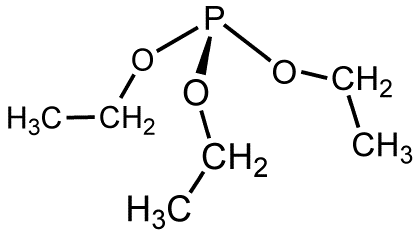

Names
- Preferred IUPAC name Triethyl phosphite
- Other names Triethoxyphosphine

Identifiers
CAS Number	122-52-1
3D model (JSmol)	Interactive image
ChemSpider	28956
ECHA InfoCard	100.004.139
PubChem CID	31215
UNII	6B2R04S55G
CompTox Dashboard (EPA)	DTXSID2026991
- InChI: InChI=1S/C6H15O3P/c1-4-7-10(8-5-2)9-6-3/h4-6H2,1-3H3 Key: BDZBKCUKTQZUTL-UHFFFAOYSA-N; InChI=1/C6H15O3P/c1-4-7-10(8-5-2)9-6-3/h4-6H2,1-3H3 Key: BDZBKCUKTQZUTL-UHFFFAOYAP
- SMILES: O(P(OCC)OCC)CC

Properties
Chemical formula	C_{6}H_{15}O_{3}P
Molar mass	166.157 g·mol^{−1}
Appearance	colorless liquid
Density	0.969 g/mL
Melting point	−70 °C (−94 °F; 203 K)
Boiling point	156 °C (313 °F; 429 K) (57 to 58 °C at 16 mm)
Solubility	soluble in most organic solvents
Magnetic susceptibility (χ)	-104.8·10^{−6} cm^{3}/mol

Hazards
- Occupational safety and health (OHS/OSH)
Main hazards	toxic
- Except where otherwise noted, data are given for materials in their standard state (at 25 °C [77 °F], 100 kPa). verify (what is ?) Infobox references

Triethyl phosphite (TEP) is an organophosphorus compound, specifically a phosphite ester, with the formula P(OCH_{2}CH_{3})_{3}, often abbreviated P(OEt)_{3}. It is a colorless, malodorous liquid. It is used as a ligand in organometallic chemistry and as a reagent in organic synthesis.

The molecule features a pyramidal phosphorus(III) center bound to three ethoxide groups. Its ^{31}P NMR spectrum features a signal at around +139 ppm vs phosphoric acid standard.

Triethylphosphite is prepared by treating phosphorus trichloride with ethanol in the presence of a base, typically a tertiary amine:

PCl_{3} + 3 EtOH + 3 R_{3}N → P(OEt)_{3} + 3 R_{3}NH + 3 Cl^{−}

In the absence of the base, the reaction of ethanol and phosphorus trichloride affords diethylphosphite ((EtO)_{2}P(O)H). Of the many related compounds can be prepared similarly, triisopropyl phosphite is an example (b.p. 43.5 °C/1.0 mm; CAS# 116–17–6).

== Reactions ==
Triethyl phosphite can react with electrophiles in a Michaelis–Arbuzov reaction to produce organophosphonates. For example, the reaction between triethyl phosphite and ethyl bromoacetate produces a phosphonate suitable for use in the Horner–Wadsworth–Emmons reaction.

Michaelis–Arbuzov reaction between ethyl bromoacetate and triethyl phosphite resulting in an organophosphonate.

Reduction/deoxygenation of hydroperoxides to the alcohols can also be effected using triethyl phosphite. This approach can be utilized for carbonyl α-hydroxylation by reacting the enolate with oxygen, producing an α-hydroperoxide which can be reduced by triethyl phosphite to the alcohol. A proposed mechanism is shown below.

Reaction scheme and proposed mechanism for carbonyl α-hydroxylation using oxygen and triethyl phosphite.

Triethyl phosphite can also be used in the Corey–Winter olefin synthesis.

=== As a ligand ===
In coordination chemistry and homogeneous catalysis, triethylphosphite finds use as a soft ligand. Its complexes are generally lipophilic and feature metals in low oxidation states. Examples include the colorless complexes FeH_{2}(P(OEt)_{3})_{4} and Ni(P(OEt)_{3})_{4} (m.p. 108 °C). It also forms a stable complex with copper(I) iodide.
