= Trimethylolpropane phosphite =

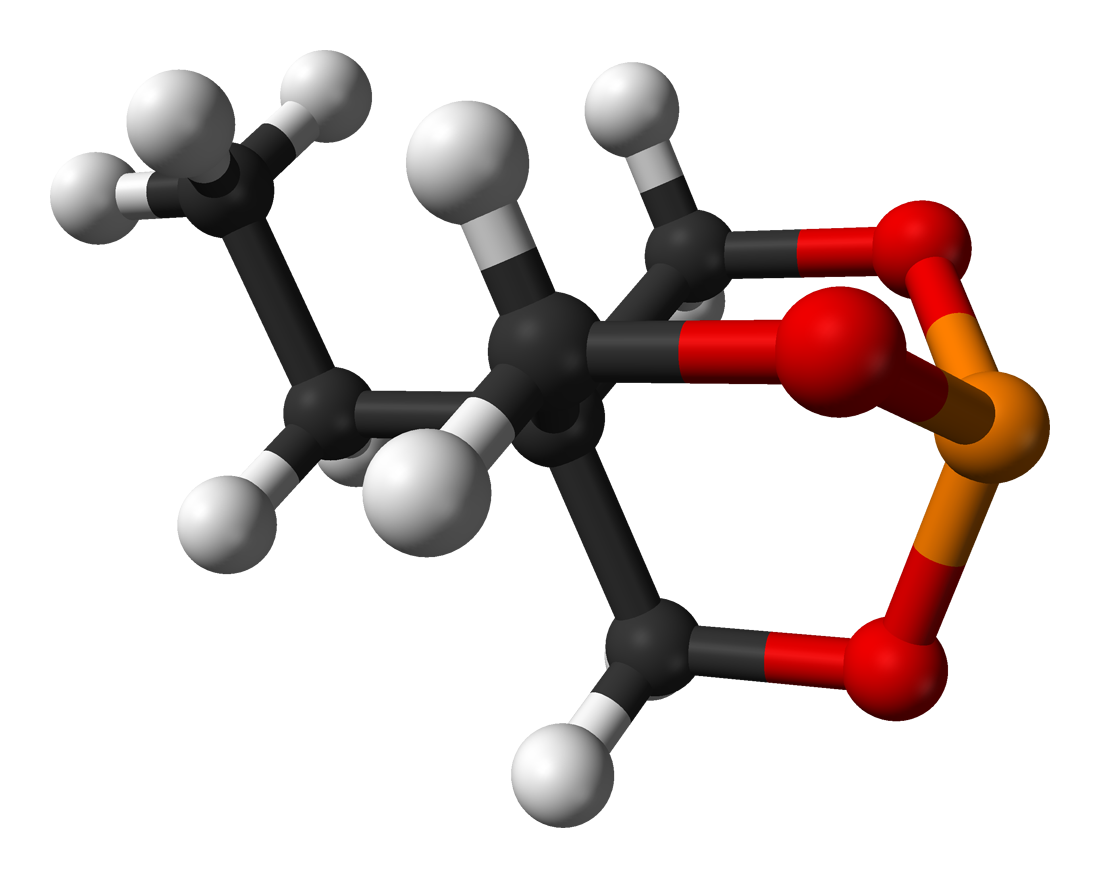

Names
- Preferred IUPAC name 4-Ethyl-2,6,7-trioxa-1-phosphabicyclo[2.2.2]octane
- Other names EtCage; Ethyl bicyclic phosphite; Trishydroxymethylpropane bicyclic phosphite

Identifiers
CAS Number	824-11-3
3D model (JSmol)	Interactive image
ChemSpider	12655
ECHA InfoCard	100.011.385
EC Number	212-523-3
PubChem CID	13210
UNII	1ND7080ZYD
CompTox Dashboard (EPA)	DTXSID10871809
- InChI: InChI=1S/C6H11O3P/c1-2-6-3-7-10(8-4-6)9-5-6/h2-5H2,1H3 Key: QRUSNTDXJQBKBI-UHFFFAOYSA-N; InChI=1/C6H11O3P/c1-2-6-3-7-10(8-4-6)9-5-6/h2-5H2,1H3 Key: QRUSNTDXJQBKBI-UHFFFAOYAD
- SMILES: O1P2OCC(CC)(C1)CO2

Properties
Chemical formula	C_{6}H_{11}O_{3}P
Molar mass	162.125 g·mol^{−1}
Appearance	white waxy solid
Melting point	56 °C (133 °F; 329 K)
Solubility in water	organic solvents
- Except where otherwise noted, data are given for materials in their standard state (at 25 °C [77 °F], 100 kPa). verify (what is ?) Infobox references

Trimethylolpropane phosphite, C_{2}H_{5}C(CH_{2}O)_{3}P, is a phosphite ester used as a ligand in organometallic chemistry. Trimethylolpropane phosphite is sometimes abbreviated to EtCage. It is a white solid that is soluble in organic solvents. It is also highly toxic.

== Preparation and reactions ==
It is prepared by reaction of trimethylolpropane with phosphorus trichloride or by transesterification with trimethylphosphite:

P(OMe)_{3} + EtC(CH_{2}OH)_{3} → 3 MeOH + EtC(CH_{2}O)_{3}P

The first member of this series was derived from trimethylolethane, but these derivatives are often poorly soluble. For this reason, the ethyl derivative has received more attention.

=== Reactions ===
The compound forms an isolable ozonide, which degrades above 0 °C to release singlet O_{2}.

=== Coordination chemistry ===
Several EtCage complexes are known, since the ligand is highly basic (for a phosphite) and has a small ligand cone angle (101°). Illustrative complexes include [(EtCage)_{2}Mo(CO)_{4}], [Ir_{4}(CO)_{11}(EtCage)] and (CpMe_{5})RuCl(EtCage)_{2}, shown below.

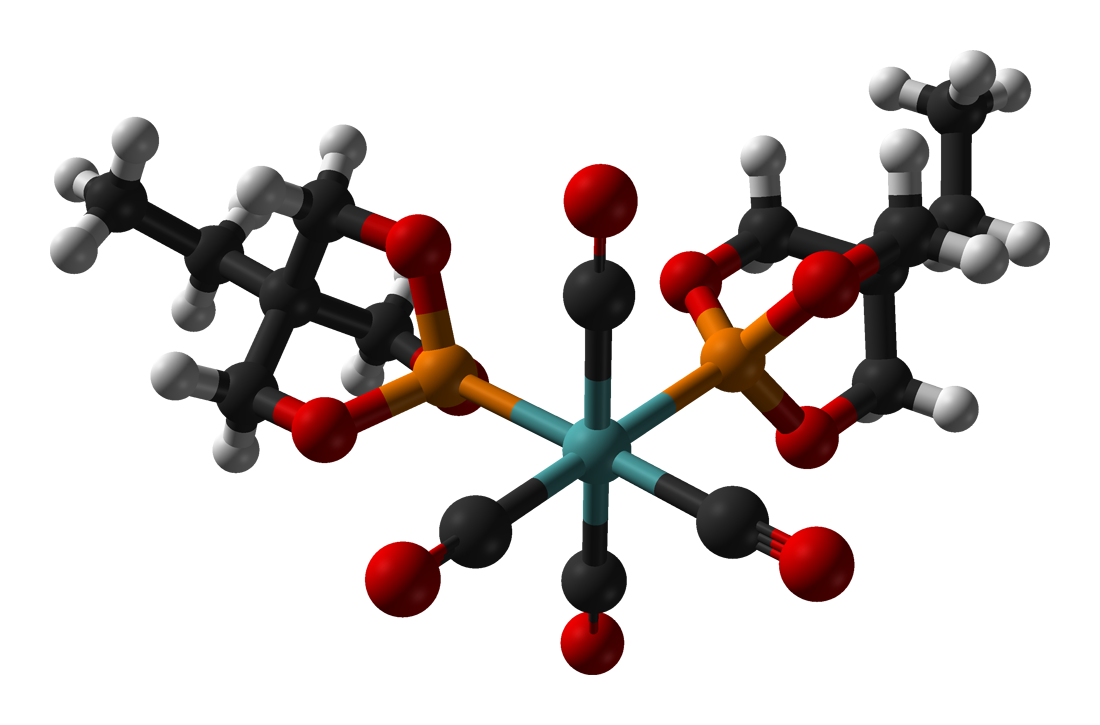
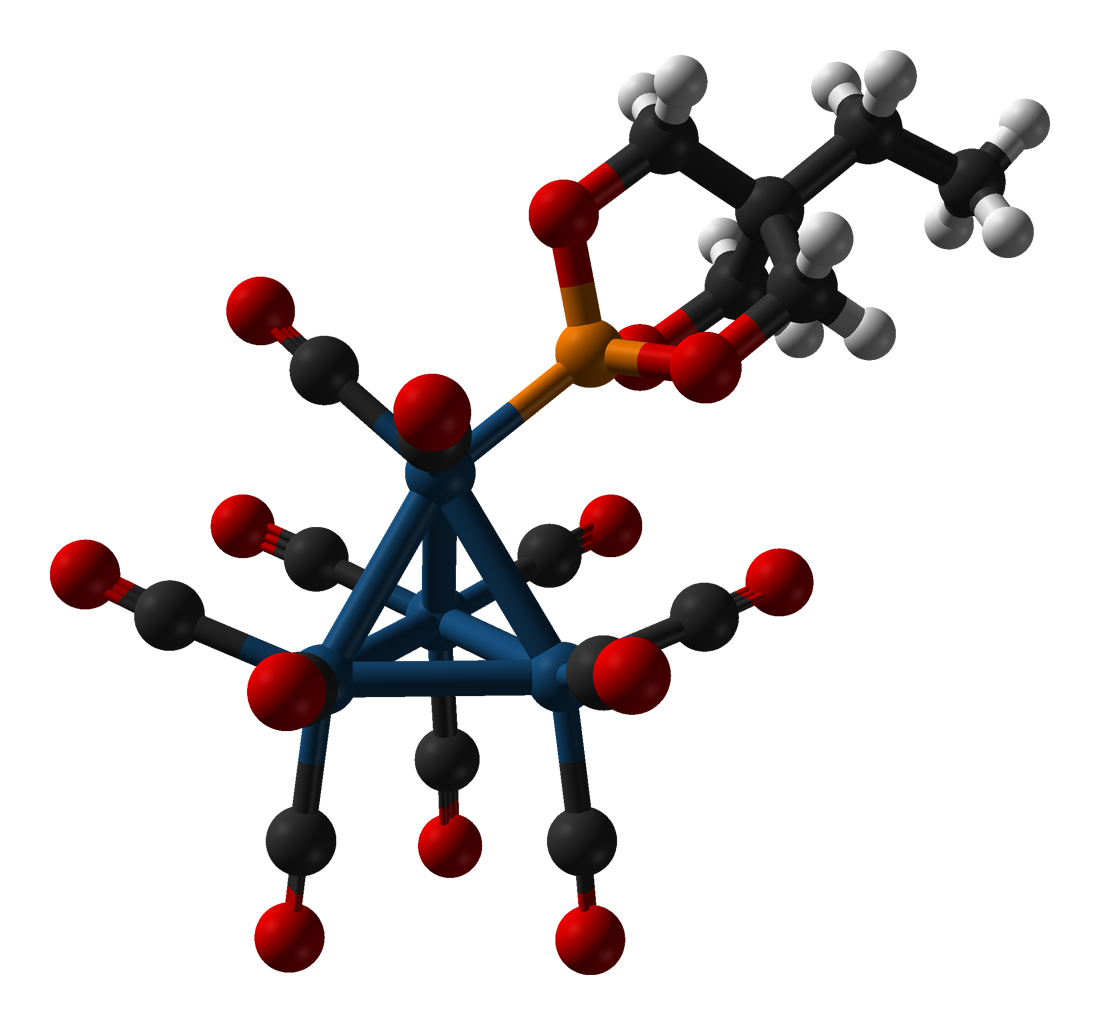
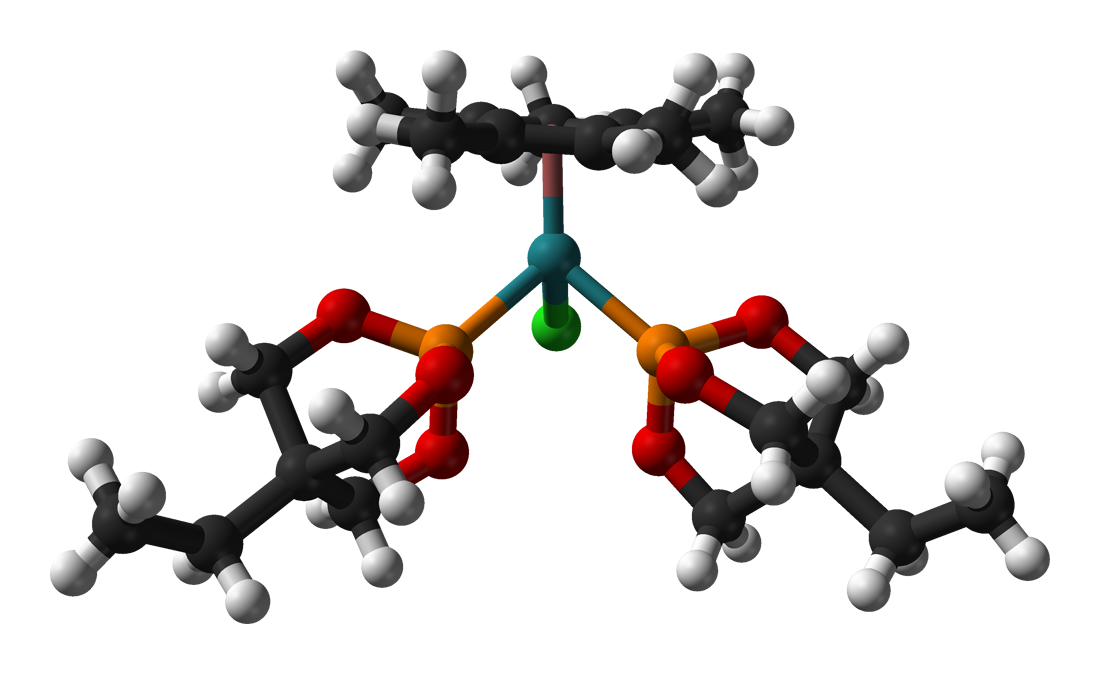

== Safety ==
Trimethylolpropane phosphite is very toxic and is a convulsant. LD50 is 1.1 mg per kg bodyweight (mice, i.p.).
