= Dimple =

Small natural flesh indentation

Dimple; (Gelasin)
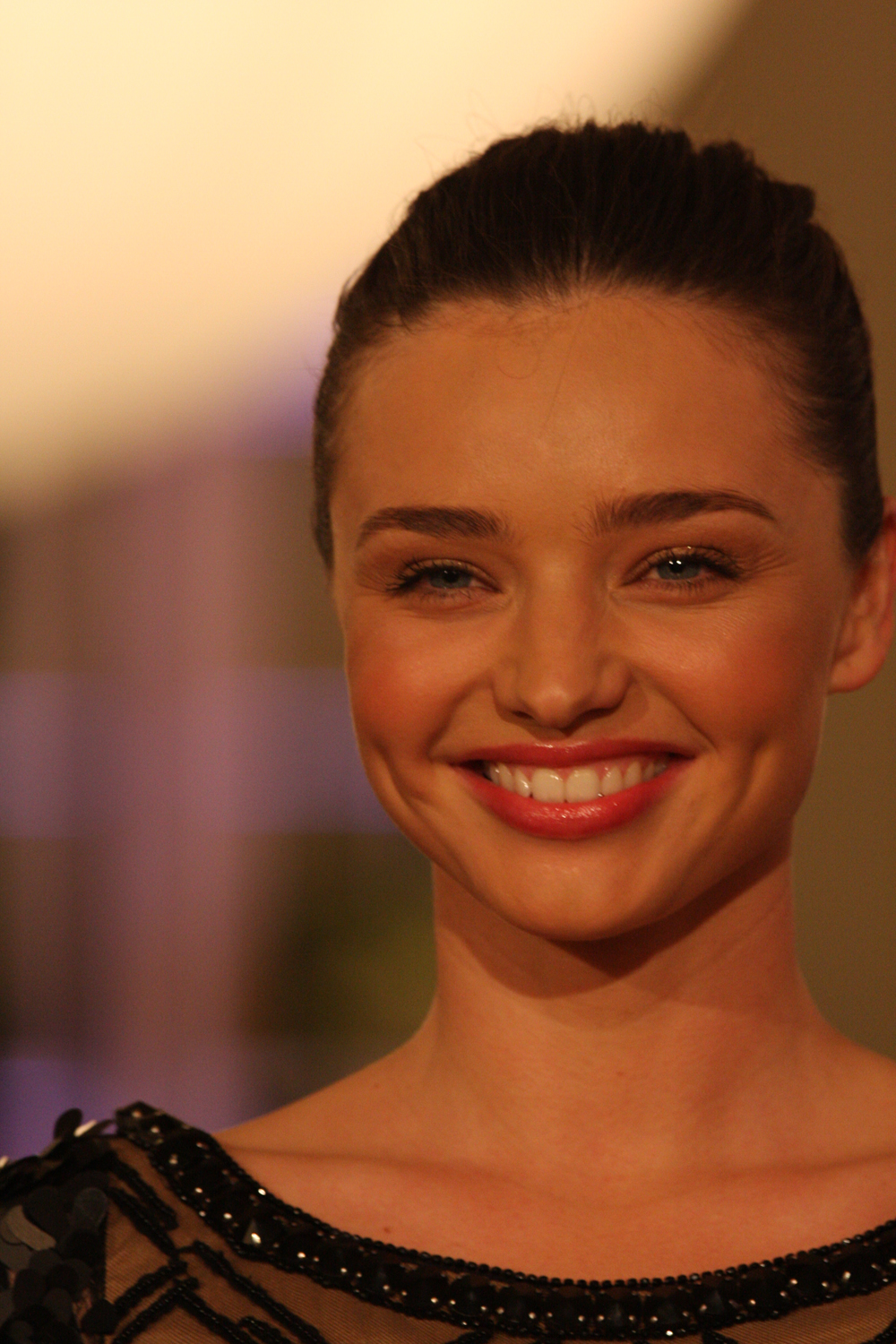
- Bilateral cheek dimples (as seen on model Miranda Kerr)

A dimple, also called a gelasin (from Latin gelasinus, from Ancient Greek γελασῖνος (gelasînos)), and a fovea buccalis, is a small natural indentation in the flesh on a part of the human body, most notably in the cheek. Numerous cultures believe that cheek dimples are a good luck charm that entices people who perceive them as physically attractive, but they are also associated with heroism and innocence, which has been included in literature for many centuries.

Medical research debates whether cheek dimples can be inherited or which type of allele they are, but it is certain that humans with cheek dimples are more likely to have them in both cheeks. Depth and length appearances are affected by the shape of the skull and dimples can appear and disappear due to age. There are four types of facial dimples, including cheek, and the cleft chin (sometimes nicknamed a "chin dimple").

== Overview ==
Cheek dimples when present, show up when a person makes a facial expression, such as smiling, whereas a chin dimple is a small line on the chin that stays on the chin without making any specific facial expressions. Dimples may appear and disappear over an extended period; a baby born with dimples in their cheeks may lose them as they grow into a child owing to their diminishing baby fat.

== Anatomy ==
Dimples are usually located on mobile tissue, and are possibly caused by variations in the structure of the facial muscle known as zygomaticus major. Specifically, the presence of a double or bifid zygomaticus major muscle may explain the formation of cheek dimples. This bifid variation of the muscle originates as a single structure from the zygomatic bone. As it travels anteriorly, it then divides with a superior bundle that inserts in the typical position above the corner of the mouth. An inferior bundle inserts below the corner of the mouth.

Cheek dimples can occur in any person, but some studies have suggested that dimples (both cheek and chin) are more common in females. They can be either permanent, or transient (aging makes dimples appear/disappear due to facial development and muscle growth): a Greek study spanning almost 20 years concluded that 34% of Greek adults had dimples whereas 13% of Greek youths (between 7 and 15 years old) had dimples as well, which might suggest that transient dimples are more common than permanent.

Professor John McDonald, citing limited research, concluded that dimples have been mislabeled as genetically inherited and as a dominant trait. It is believed that cheek dimple genes occur on the 5th chromosome, whereas cleft chin genes occur on the 16th. However, the University of Utah considers dimples an "irregular" dominant trait that is probably controlled mostly by one gene but is influenced by other genes.

== Characteristics ==
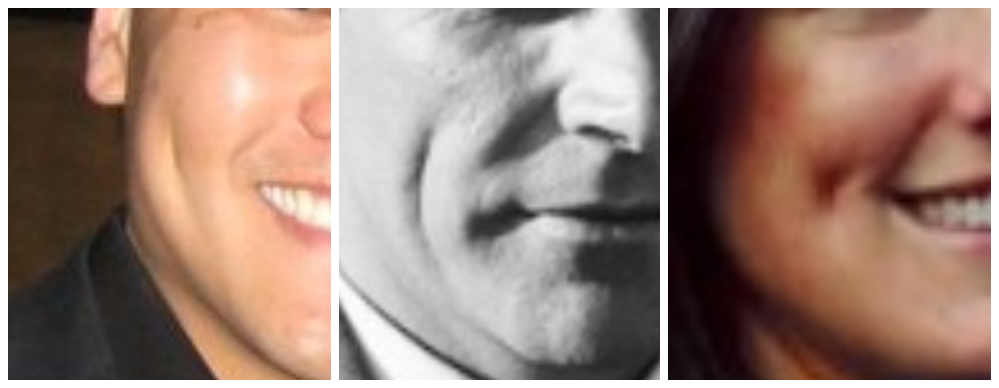
Due to face shape, dimples come in many depths, shapes and sizes. Some only show when smiling (panels 1, 3) whereas others can permanently be in a person's face (panel 2).

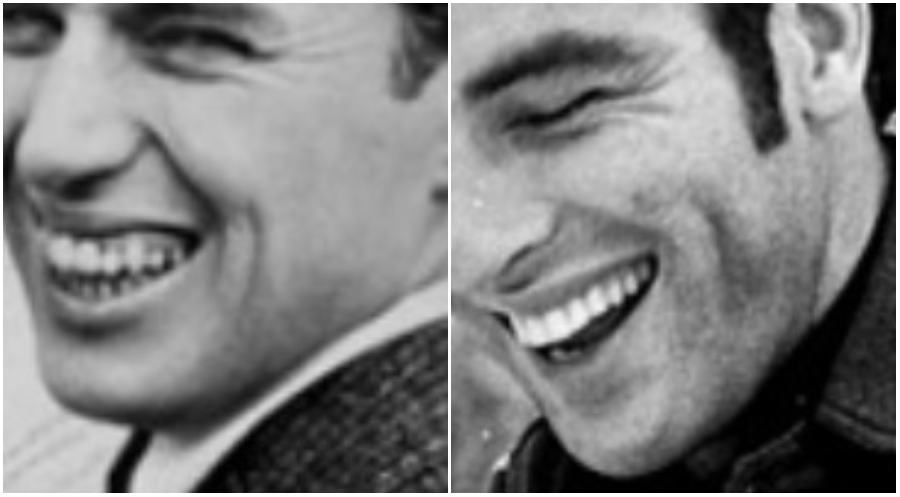
Cheek dimple by the KBC point (right), and a para-angled dimple near the mouth

Having bilateral dimples (dimples in both cheeks) is the most common form of cheek dimples. In a 2018 study of 216 people aged 18–42 with both unilateral (one dimple) and bilateral, 120 (55.6%) had dimples in both of their cheeks. It was originally concluded that 60% of people with one dimple likely have it in their left cheek, but later research concluded that 53% were on the right, however, this may be due to differing cultures. Dimples are analogous and how they form in cheeks varies from person to person. Dimple depth and size can also vary; unilateral dimples are usually large, and a possible 12.8% of bilateral people have dimples positioned asymmetrically. They are not linked with a dimpled chin: a study from 2010 by the University of Ilorin examined 500 Yoruban Nigerians with both uni- and bilateral cheek dimples, discovering that only 36 (7.2%) had a cleft chin as well.

The shape of a person's face can affect the look and form as well: leptoprosopic (long and narrow) faces have long and narrow dimples, and euryprosopic (short and broad) faces have short, circular dimples. People with a mesoprosopic face are more likely to have dimples in their cheeks than any other face shape. Singaporean plastic surgeon Khoo Boo-Chai (1929–2012) determined that a cheek dimple occurs on the intersecting line between the corner of the mouth and the outer canthi of the eye, (nicknamed the "KBC point" in dimple surgery) but people with natural dimples do not always have their dimples on the KBC point. The other common type of facial dimple form near the mouth in three types: lower para-angle (underneath the mouth and lips), para-angle ("around the mouth angle"), and upper para-angle (above the mouth and lips).

== Society and culture ==
Cheek dimples are often associated with youth and beauty and are seen as an attractive quality in a person's face, accentuating smiles and making the smile look more cheerful and memorable. Throughout numerous cultures and history, there have been superstitions based on dimples: Chinese culture believes that cheek dimples are a good luck charm (particularly, children born with them are seen as pleasant, polite and enthusiastic), but can lead to complicated romantic relationships; Haitian mothers gently form indents into newborns' cheek in hopes of molding dimples into the child's face; and a proverb (often incorrectly credited to Pope Paul VI) argues "A dimple in your cheek/Many hearts you'll seek/A dimple in your chin/The devil within". According to Candy Bites: The Science of Sweets, the dent in Junior Mints is based on this belief, arguing that a unilateral dimple is more attractive than bilateral. Richard Steele wrote that a dimpled laugh "is practised to give a grace to the features, and is frequently made a bait to entangle a gazing lover; this was called by the ancients the Chian laugh." He added: "The prude hath a wonderful esteem for the Chian laugh or dimple [...] and is never seen upon the most extravagant jests to disorder her countenance with the ruffle of a smile [but] very rarely takes the freedom to sink her cheek into a dimple" implying that dimples are alluring due to demure women that have them.

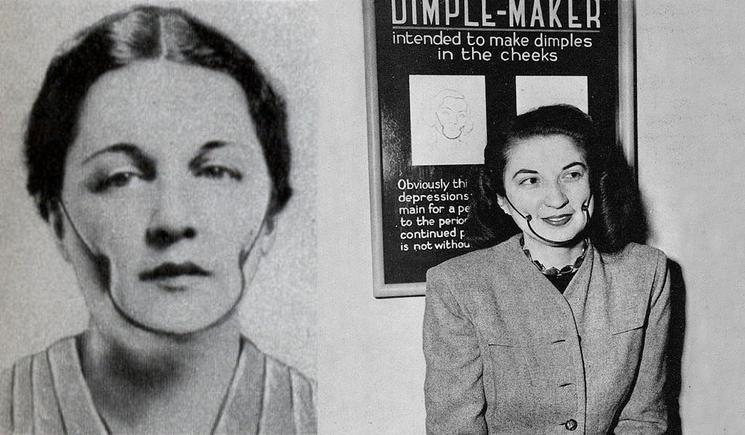
Isabelle Gilbert's (not pictured) Dimple Maker claimed to make permanent cheek dimples for women who desired them.

The Englishwoman's Magazine from 1866 featured an article named "The Human Form Divine: Dimples and Wrinkles", which associated cheek dimples with youth. On transient dimples, it wrote: "But generally, dimples mark the departure of youth, and fade away at the approach of crow's feet"; "Did you ever see a pretty child's face without dimples in it? Dimples in the cheek – temping dimples – and a dimple in the chin that gave a roguish smartness to the face?" British boxer-turned-Hollywood actor Reginald Denny had his cheek dimples gushed about in a Photoplay article, which Professor Michael Williams inferred that "dimples might also provide a humanizing touch" in the handsome Denny who had "dimples in conjunction with the physique of a young Greek god[.]"

Women without dimples are said to envy the women that have them because dimples are "pitfalls for the men" that "[are] something purely natural and unattainable by art". While it is not possible to give a definite explanation as to why dimples are attractive on a woman, researchers believe this "neutral feature" can be linked to paternity confidence, which is the ability of a man to easily distinguish his own offspring. This has led to artificial attempts to create them: the Ohio-based Dolly Dimpler company advertised in Photoplay about a device that created dimples in customers' cheeks; in 1936, Isabella Gilbert invented the Dimple Maker, a face-fitting brace which pushed dents into the cheeks to emulate dimples, but it is unknown whether the artificial dimples could last this way (the American Medical Association argued that frequent users could develop cancer); and from the ‘60s on, people can undergo dimple surgery, widely used in the 21st Century.

=== In fiction ===
The sentiments appear in fiction: authors have described dimples in their characters for centuries to show beauty, especially in women, which has been seen as part of their sex appeal. This is possibly why cheek dimples have been identified with female characters: Anne from Anne of Green Gables envied other female characters' dimples, whereas Wives and Daughters featured a paragraph about Molly wondering whether she was beautiful as she looked in her mirror, which was followed by: "She would have been sure if, instead of inspecting herself with such solemnity, she had smiled her own sweet merry smile, and called out the gleam of her teeth, and the charm of her dimples." Scarlett O'Hara exploited her cheek dimples in Gone with the Wind when she was flirting to get her own way, to the point where Rhett is implied to be aware of what she is doing.

Shakespeare often acknowledged cheek dimples, usually on children, such as "the pretty dimples of [the baby boy's] chin and cheek" in The Winter's Tale or the "pretty dimpled boys, like smiling Cupids" from Antony and Cleopatra; however, Adonis' in Venus and Adonis are mentioned from the point of view of the flirting Venus. There are theories that some of his famous female protagonists had them as well, such as Juliet Capulet, "Jessica and Maria [and] Rosalind."

== See also ==
- Cleft chin – also known as a "chin dimple"
- Dimples of Venus – nickname for dimples in the lower back, which are portrayed as physically attractive
- Mendelian traits in humans
- Sacral dimple – lower back dimples
- Skin dimple
