= Sacral dimple =

Small depression in the skin located just above the buttocks

A sacral dimple (also termed pilonidal dimple or spinal dimple) is a small depression in the skin, located just above the buttocks. The name comes from the sacrum, the bone at the end of the spine, over which the dimples are found. Sacral dimples can be discovered during routine exams of newborn children (neonate). A sacral dimple on a neonate is defined as a midline dimple less than 5 mm in diameter and no further than 2.5 cm from the anus without associated visible drainage or hairy tuft.

Sacral dimples are common benign congenital anomalies found in up to 4% of the population, Other common benign congenital anomalies include supernumerary digits, third nipples and natal teeth. Most sacral dimple cases are minor and do not relate to any underlying medical problem, but some can result from disease, notably spina bifida. If so, this is usually the spina bifida occulta form, which is the least serious kind.

Simple dimples are typically small, measuring less than 5 mm in size. They are positioned in the midline, within 2.5 cm of the anus, and do not have any other associated skin abnormalities. Atypical dimples, on the other hand, have different characteristics. They are larger than 5 mm in size and are located within 2.5 cm of the anus. Atypical dimples can also be deep, positioned above the gluteal crease, located outside the midline, or occur as multiple dimples.

Sacral dimples are often spotted in post-natal checks by pediatricians, who can check:

- whether the floor of the dimple is covered with skin;
- whether there is a tuft of hair in the dimple;
- whether there are potentially related problems such as weak lower limbs;
- the distance from the buttocks to the dimple.

For clinicians dealing with infants who have sacral dimples, it is essential to be aware of the characteristics of atypical dimples. Careful examinations should be conducted to identify any atypical features in order to appropriately manage and refer these cases in clinical practice. Understanding the distinction between simple and atypical sacral dimples is crucial for pediatric practitioners because of the potential association with occult spinal dysraphism (OSD). The pooled incidence of OSD in patients with an atypical dimple, as observed in several studies, was significantly higher (8.8%) compared to patients with a simple dimple (0.6%). Given this increased risk, infants with atypical dimples require further evaluation through radiologic imaging and early referrals to neurosurgical specialists. Prompt identification and appropriate management of atypical dimples can help ensure timely intervention and improved outcomes for infants with potential underlying spinal abnormalities.

A sacral dimple could also indicate a kidney problem of a kind that can be checked with an ultrasound.

== Classification ==
One study assign sacral dimples ICD9CM code of 685.1, alongside "pilonidal cyst without mentioning of abscess".

== See also ==
- Dimples of Venus
- Pilonidal sinus
