= Dimples of Venus =

Depressions over the gluteal fold

Dimples of venus lateral lumbar fossa
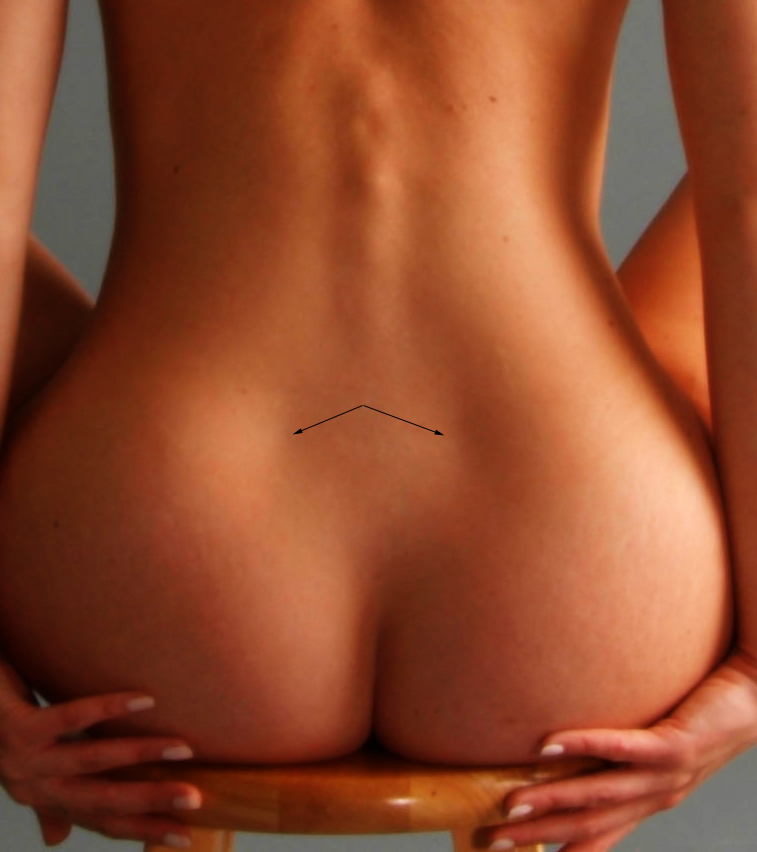
- The lower back of a sitting woman, with the dimples of Venus indicated by the two arrows

Details

Identifiers
- Latin: fossae lumbales laterales
- TA2: 273
- FMA: 20209

The dimples of Venus (also known as back dimples, butt dimples or Veneral dimples) are sagittally symmetrical indentations sometimes visible on the human lower back, just superior to the gluteal cleft. They are directly superficial to the two sacroiliac joints, the sites where the sacrum attaches to the ilium of the pelvis. An imaginary line joining both dimples of Venus passes over the spinous process of the second sacral vertebra (S2).

== Overview ==
The term "dimples of Venus", while informal, is a historically accepted name within the medical profession for the superficial topography of the sacroiliac joints. The Latin name is fossae lumbales laterales ("lateral lumbar indentations"). These indentations are created by a short ligament stretching between the posterior superior iliac spine and the skin.

Named after Venus, the Roman goddess of beauty, they are sometimes believed to be a mark of beauty. The features may be seen on both female and male backs, but seem to be more common and more prominent in women. When seen in men, they are called "dimples of Apollo", named after the Greco-Roman god of male beauty.

Another use of the term "dimples of Venus" in surgical anatomy refers to two symmetrical indentations on the posterior aspect of the sacrum, which also contain a venous channel. They are used as a landmark for finding the superior articular facets of the sacrum as a guide to place sacral pedicle screws in spine surgery.

However, back dimples are largely genetically predetermined and can only be altered within limits. A study by the American Exercise Council is said to have shown that an average of 22 percent body fat in women and 32 percent body fat in men improves the visibility of these dimples. Further research has shown that the lumbar dimples have an effect on the anatomy of the spinal-pelvic junction. However, no statistically significant correlation was found between low back pain and the presence of these dimples.

In the 2010s, back dimples became a popular location for women to get transdermal body piercings.

== See also ==
- Apollo's belt
- Dimples
- Lower-back tattoo
- Rhombus of Michaelis
- Sacral dimple
- Thecal sac
- Venus Callipyge
