= Micheli =

Micheli is an Italian surname. Notable people with the surname include:

- Khatlyn Micheli, Italian-American Mineral Policy Specialist
- Amanda Micheli, American filmmaker
- Blessed Clotilde Micheli (1849–1911), Italian Roman Catholic professed religious
- Carlo Micheli (born 1946), Italian chess master
- Dante Micheli (1939–2012), Italian footballer
- Elena Micheli (born 1999), Italian modern pentathlete
- Enrico Luigi Micheli (1938–2011), Italian politician and writer
- Fiorenza "Fio" Micheli, Italian-American marine ecologist and conservation biologist
- Franco Micheli, Italian sports shooter
- Giuseppe Micheli (pentathlete) (1888–?), Italian modern pentathlete
- Giuseppe Micheli (1874–1948), Italian notary and politician
- Guglielmo Micheli (1866–1926), Italian painter
- Isabella Micheli (1962), Italian former ice dancer
- Ivo Barnabò Micheli (1942–2005), Italian film director and screenwriter
- Jacques-Barthélemy Micheli du Crest (1690–1766), Genevan politician, physicist and cartographer
- Laura Micheli (born 1931), Italian gymnast
- Laurent Micheli (born 1982), Belgian film and stage director, writer and actor
- Lucia Micheli (born 1969), Italian sprint canoer
- Marc Micheli (1844–1902), Italian botanist, abbreviated as "Micheli"
- Maurizio Micheli (born 1947), Italian actor, voice actor, author and playwright
- Ornella Micheli (sometimes credited as Donna Christie or Ornella Micheli Donati), Italian film editor
- Pier Antonio Micheli (1679–1737), Italian botanist, abbreviated as "P.Micheli." Considered to be the founder of scientific mycology.
- Rodolfo Micheli (1930–2022), former Argentine football striker
- Ron Micheli (born 1948), former director of the Wyoming Department of Agriculture (1977–1992)
- Zanetto Micheli (c. 1489–after 1560), Italian, the first representative of the oldest known family of string instrument makers

== See also ==
- Michelis
