= De Michelis =

de Michelis (or alternate spellings Demichelis, Demicheli) may refer to:

- Adriano de Micheli (born 1975), Italian auto racing driver
- Giovanni De Micheli, electrical engineer and educator
- Maria Pierina De Micheli (1890–1945), Italian Roman Catholic religious sister
- Mario De Micheli (born 1906), Italian footballer
- Paola De Micheli (born 1973), Italian politician
- Cesare G. De Michelis (born 1944), professor of Russian literature at the University of Rome
- Elizabeth De Michelis, scholar of modern yoga
- Eurialo De Michelis (1904–1990), Italian writer
- Gianni De Michelis (1940–2019), Italian politician
- Martín Demichelis (born 1980), Argentine football manager and former player
- Alberto Demicheli (1896–1980), Uruguayan politician
- Tulio Demicheli (1914–1992), Argentine film director
- Sofía Álvarez Vignoli de Demicheli (1899–1986), First Lady of Uruguay
