= Leo Michelis =

Greek-Canadian economist

- Education: Queen's University
- Scientific career
- Fields: Economics
- Workplaces: Toronto Metropolitan University

Leo Michelis is a Greek-Canadian economist. He is a professor of economics at Toronto Metropolitan University. He received his Ph.D. in economics from Queen's University and his B.A. and M.A. degrees from York University. His areas of research interests are theoretical and applied econometrics and macro-monetary economics. He has published, among others, in Canadian Journal of Economics, Journal of Applied Econometrics, Journal of Econometrics and Journal of Economic Dynamics and Control.

== Books ==
- Macroeconomics (with B. De Long & A. Mansoorian), (2004), McGraw-Hill Publishing Co.
- Exchange Rates, Economic Integration and the International Economy (co-edited with M. Lovewell) (2004), APF Press.

== Selected publications ==
- "Money, Capital and Real Liquidity Effects with Habit Formation" (with A. Mansoorian) Canadian Journal of Economics (2005).
- "Money, Habits and Endogenous Growth" (with A. Mansoorian) Journal of Economic Dynamics and Control (2004).
- "The Distributions of the J and Cox Nonnested Tests in Regression Models with Nearly Orthogonal Regressors" Journal of Econometrics (1999).
- "Numerical Distribution Functions of Likelihood Ratio Tests for Cointegration" (with J.G. MacKinnon and A.A. Haug) Journal of Applied Econometrics (1999).
