= Max Runge =

German obstetrician and gynecologist

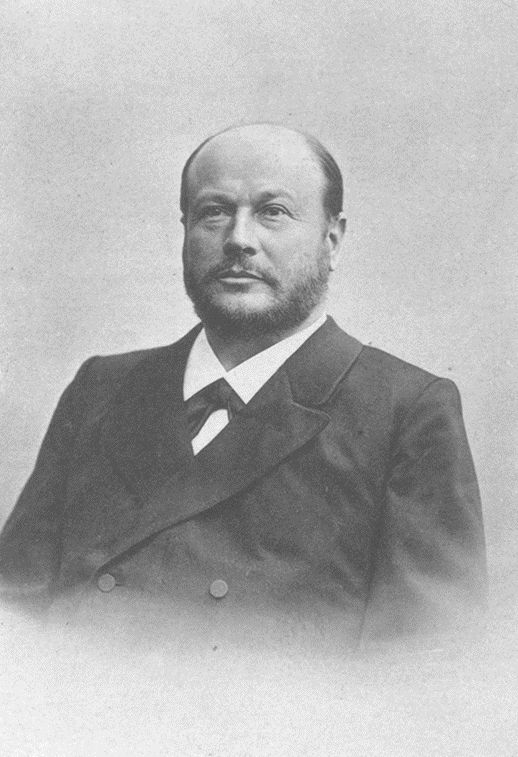
Heinrich Max Runge

Heinrich Max Runge (21 September 1849, in Stettin – 27 July 1909, in Göttingen) was a German obstetrician and gynecologist.

He studied medicine at the universities of Jena, Leipzig, Bonn and Strasbourg, where in 1875 he received his doctorate. In 1879 he obtained his habilitation at Berlin under the sponsorship of Adolf Gusserow. In 1883 he became a professor of obstetrics and gynecology at the Imperial University of Dorpat, and five years later relocated as a professor to Göttingen, where on three occasions he served as dean at the university.

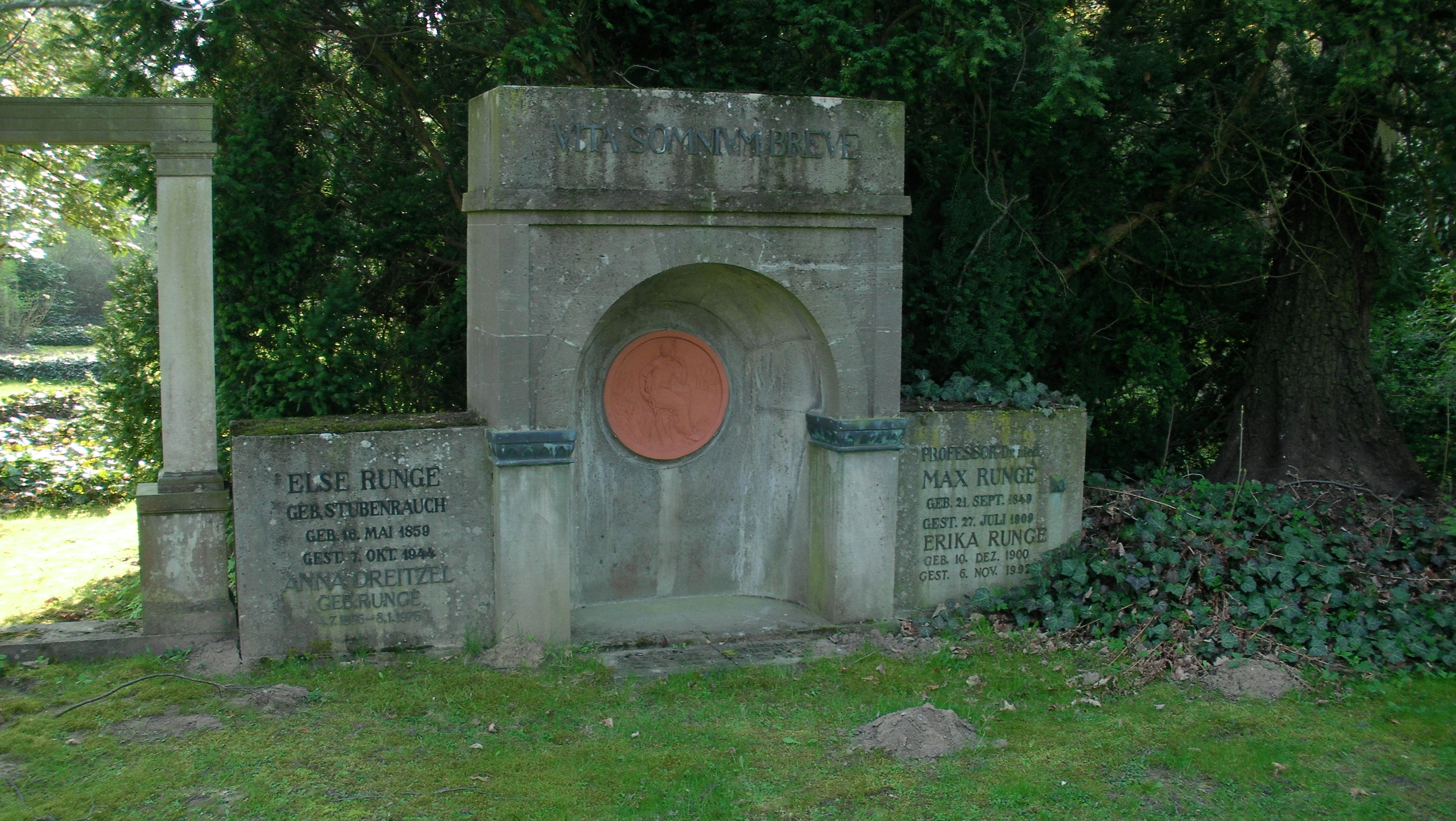
Gravesite of Runge at the Stadtfriedhof (Göttingen).

He was the author of influential textbooks on both obstetrics and gynecology. The focus of his research included hot water therapy for uterine atony, treatment of puerperal fever, fetal disease, umbilical infections and laparotomy.

== Selected works ==
- Die Krankheiten der ersten Lebenstage, 1885 – Diseases of the first days of life.
- Lehrbuch der Geburtshülfe, 1891 – Textbook of obstetrics
- Lehrbuch der Gynäkologie, 1902 – Textbook of gynecology.
