= Adolf Michaelis =

German classical scholar (1835–1910)

Adolf Michaelis (22 June 1835 – 12 August 1910) was a German classical scholar, a professor of art history at the University of Strasbourg from 1872, who helped establish the connoisseurship of Ancient Greek sculpture and Roman sculpture on their modern footing. Just at the cusp of the introduction of photography as a tool of art history, Michaelis pioneered supplementing his descriptions with sketches.

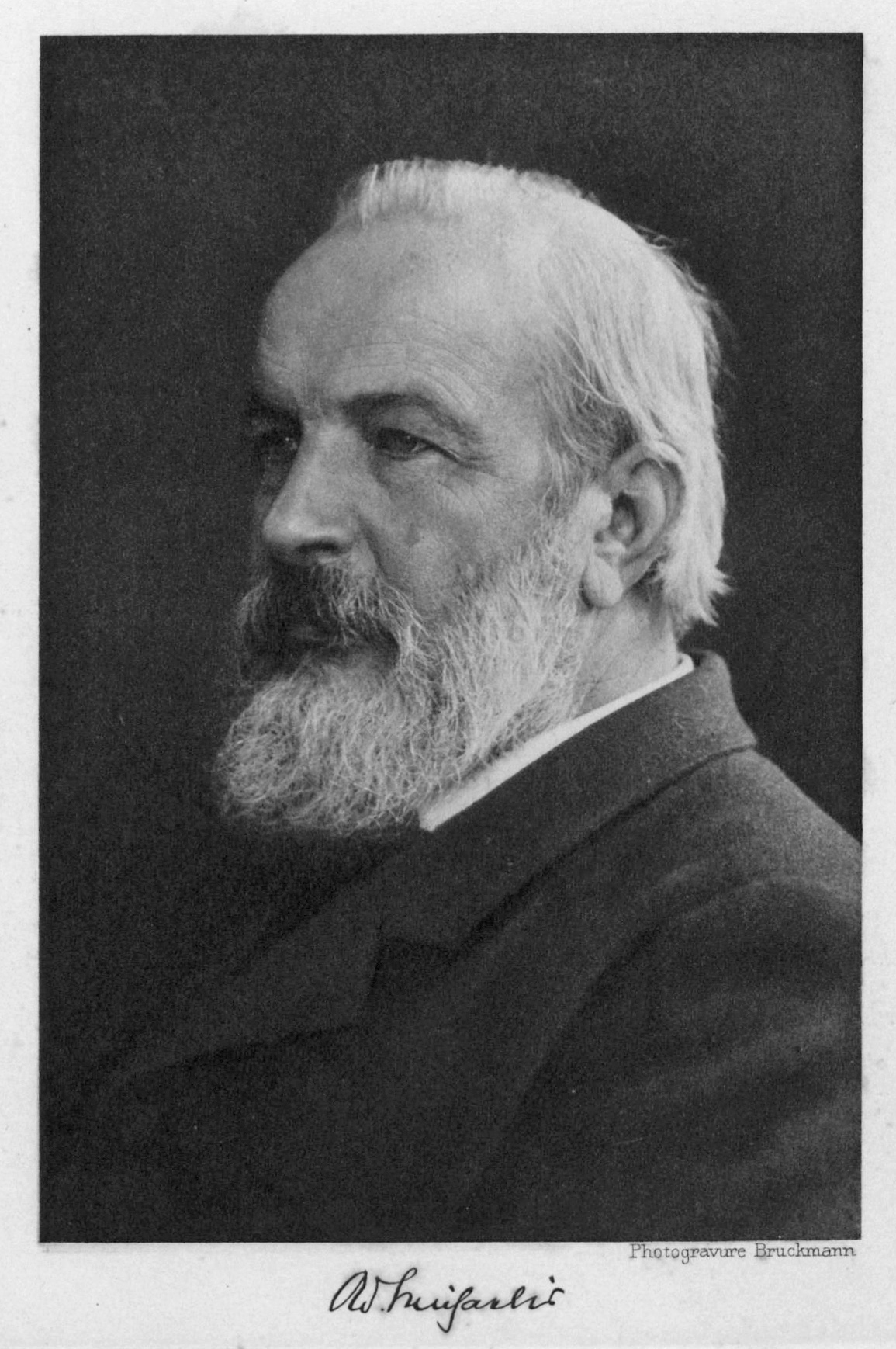
Adolf Michaelis

== Biography ==
Adolf Michaelis was born in Kiel, Schleswig-Holstein, the son of the gynecologist Gustav Adolf Michaelis (1798–1848) and the nephew of Otto Jahn, who introduced scientific philological method into classical archaeology; Jahn first guided his nephew's interest in the classics. After Jahn's death, Michaelis produced, in 1880 a second edition of Jahn's scholarly presentation of an excerpt of Pausanias' description of Greece, Arx Athenarum a Pausania Descripta, offering the Greek text with Latin introduction and notes. The title was a modest understatement: Jahn collected all the classical references to the Acropolis of Athens and all the surviving inscriptions, and incorporated them into a history woven from classical sources. In the 1880 edition, Michaelis added forty plates of site plans, drawings and scholarly restorations of buildings and monuments, as well as engravings of sculpture, terracottas and coins illustrating the cult practices and deities honored on Arx Athenarum, "Athena's hill".

Michaelis read classical philology and archaeology at the University of Leipzig, where he attended the classes of Johannes Overbeck (1826–1895), an expert on Pompeii whose emphasis on written sources for documenting Greek art was influential in formulating Michaelis' approach to antiquities and whose corpus of mythological representations in Greek art, Griechische Kunstmythologie, begun in 1871, helped spark Michaelis' own compilation of antiquities in English collections.

Michaelis pursued further studies in Berlin then returned to Kiel to work on Horace. A trip to Rome in 1857 introduced him to the circle of scholars at the Deutsches Archäologisches Institut (The German Archaeological Institute), on whose fellowship he travelled to Greece with Alexander Conze in 1859-60, On his return to Germany he taught briefly at Greifswald and Tübingen, 1862-67. In 1872, following the publication of his monograph on the Parthenon he accepted the chair for Classical Archaeology at the recently established University of Strasbourg, where he settled down for life and created a great department of archaeology supported by a great archaeological library and a vast cast collection. During recesses he scoured the collections of classical sculpture conserved in English country houses, the result of a century and a half of British collecting; in 1882 he published the repertory for which he has remained famous, a work still referred to, Ancient Marbles in Great Britain; this, in addition to his scholarly work on classical sculpture, is the cornerstone of the history of English collecting in the eighteenth and nineteenth centuries.

From 1894 until 1899, he was also administrator of the Egyptian collection at the University of Strasbourg.

Michaelis summed up his knowledge in 1906 with his Die archäologischen Entdeckungen des neunzehnten Jahrhunderts, one of the first historiographies of the development in classical archaeology that had taken place during the nineteenth century; it follows in detail the archaeological expeditions, many of them undertaken by German institutions, with illustrations and site plans, ending with an overview of the older archaeology and the conditions of new views.

Michaelis died at Strasbourg. His volume on classical art, Das Altertum, written for Anton Springer's extensive survey, Handbuch der Kunstgeschichte, appeared posthumously in 1911.

== Bibliography ==
- Der Parthenon, Leipzig, 1870-1871. (Plates and text @ Universitätsbibliothek Heidelberg)
- Geschichte des Deutschen Archäologischen Instituts, 1829-1879, Berlin, 1879. (@ Universitätsbibliothek Heidelberg)
- Rede über die Entwicklung der Archäologie in unserem Jahrhundert, Straßburg, 1881.
- Ancient Marbles in Great Britain, Cambridge, 1882. (Internet Archive)
- Zur aristotelischen Lehre vom ΝΟΥΣ, Neu-Strelitz, 1888. (Internet Archive)
- Literaturnachweis zur siebenten Auflage des ersten Bandes von Anton Springers Handbuch der Kunstgeschichte, Leipzig, 1904. (Internet Archive)
- Die archäologischen Entdeckungen des neunzehnten Jahrhunderts, Leipzig, 1906. (@ Universitätsbibliothek Heidelberg)
  - Second edition: Ein jahrhundert kunstarchäologischer entdeckungen, Leipzig, 1908. (Internet Archive)
    - A century of archaeological discoveries, London, 1908. (Internet Archive)
- Das Altertum, Leipzig, 1911.
