= Rhombus of Michaelis =

Rhombus-shaped contour on the lower human back

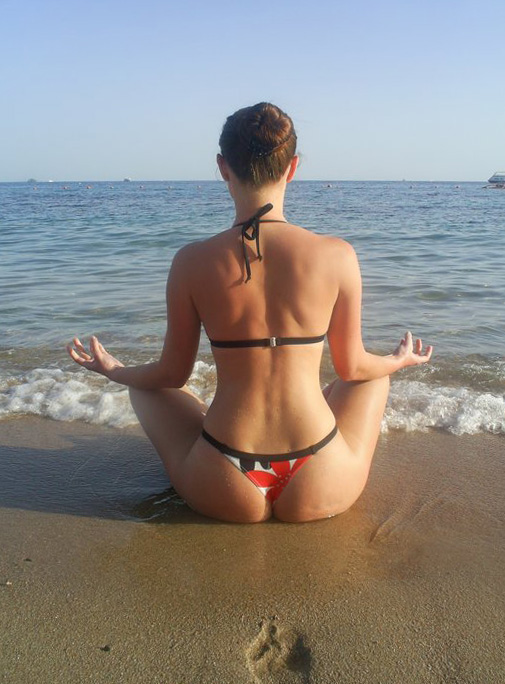
The upper half of the rhombus of Michaelis is visible just above the bikini bottom.

The rhombus of Michaelis, also known as the Michaelis-Raute or the quadrilateral of Michaelis, is a rhombus-shaped contour (also referred to as kite-shaped or diamond-shaped) that is sometimes visible on the lower human back. The rhombus is defined by the following vertices: dimples of Venus, the top of the gluteal crease (S5 vertebral body level), and the lower end of the posterior median furrow (spinous process of the 5th lumbar vertebra).

The Rhombus of Michaelis is named after Gustav Adolf Michaelis, a 19th-century German obstetrician.

== Sources ==
- Baskett, Thomas F. (2019). Eponyms and Names in Obstetrics and Gynaecology. Cambridge: Cambridge University Press. pp. 282–283. ISBN 978-1-108-42170-6.
- Radcliffe, Walter (1989). Milestones in Midwifery. San Francisco: Norman Publishing. pp. 79–80. ISBN 9780930405205.
- Schroeder, Karl Ludwig Ernst (1878). A Manual of midwifery. New York: Dr Appleton and Company. p. 234.
