= Ludwig Julius Caspar Mende =

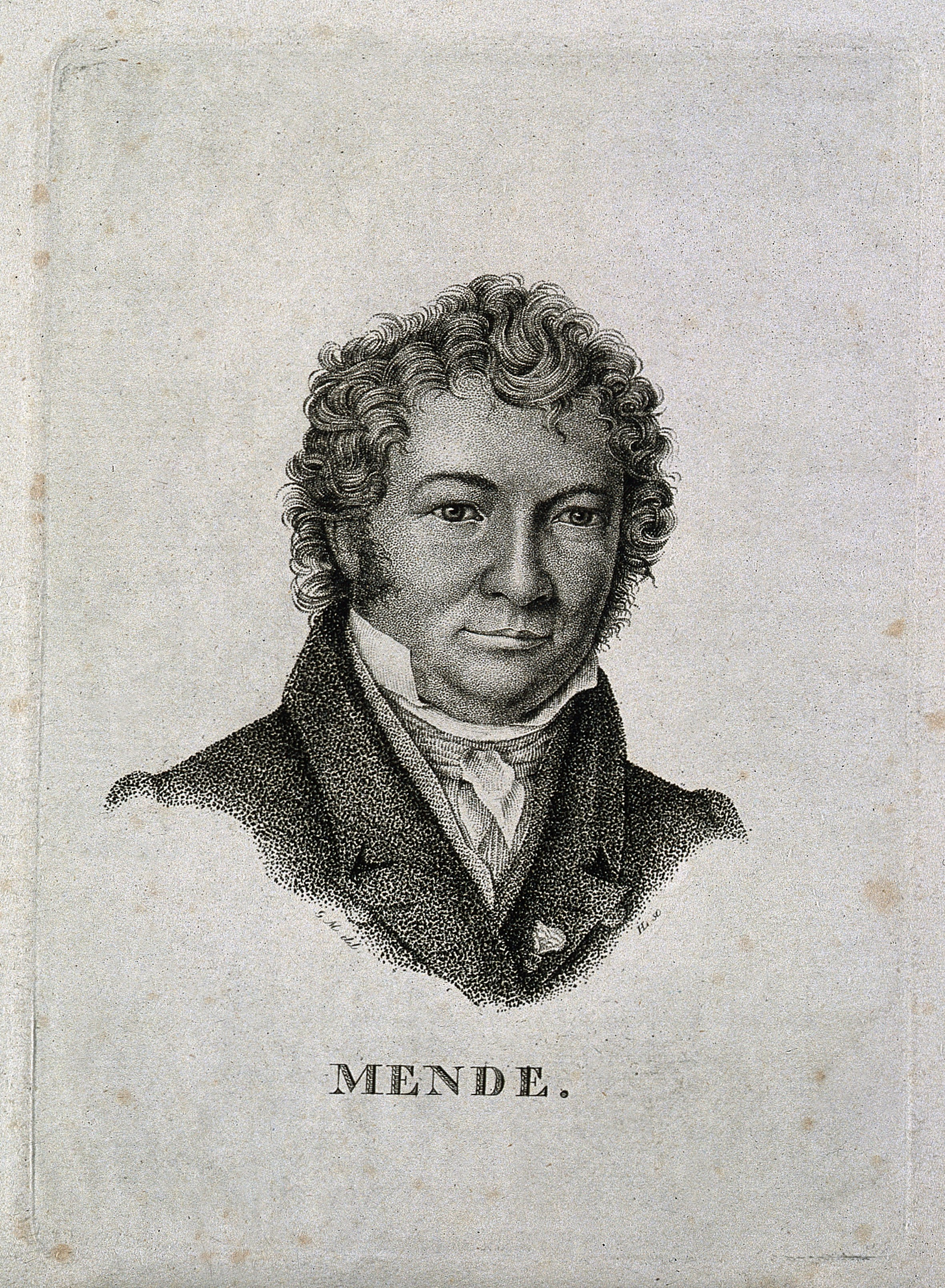
Ludwig Julius Caspar Mende

Ludwig Julius Caspar Mende (14 September 1779 in Greifswald – 23 April 1832 in Göttingen) was a German obstetrician and gynecologist.

After graduation from the University of Göttingen (1801), he began work as a lecturer at the University of Greifswald. In 1814 he became an associate professor at Greifswald, followed by a full professorship during the following year. In 1823 he was appointed professor of forensic medicine and obstetrics at Göttingen, where until his death in 1832, he served as director of the department of obstetrics and gynecology.

At Göttingen, he was involved in scientific research of OB/GYN issues that included uterine retroflexion, genital prolapse, cervical cancer and postpartum hemorrhage. As an administrator, he gained a reputation for providing a regimen of high quality training in the field of midwifery.

== Selected written works ==
- Beobachtungen und Bemerkungen aus der Geburtshülfe und gerichtlichen Medicin, three volumes (1824 to 1826) - Observations and comments on obstetrics and forensic medicine.
- Zeitschrift für gerichtliche Medicin, two volumes (1827 to 1830) - Journal of forensic medicine.
