= Edward Michelis =

German Roman Catholic theologian

Edward Michelis (born in Münster, St. Mauritz, 6 February 1813; died in Luxembourg, 8 June 1855) was a German Roman Catholic theologian.

== Life ==
After his ordination, in 1836, he was appointed private secretary to Clemens August von Droste-Vischering, Archbishop of Cologne, whose imprisonment he shared, first in the fortress of Minden (1837), and later at Magdeburg and Erfurt. On his release in 1841 he returned to St. Mauritz, where, the following year, he established the Sisters of Divine Providence, whom he placed in charge of an orphanage he had also founded.

In 1844 he was made professor of dogmatic theology in the seminary at Luxemburg, where he remained until his death. He was also the founder of the "Münstersche Sonntagsblatt" newspaper, and co-founder and editor-in-chief of "Das Luxemburger Wort" (1848).

== Works ==
Among Michelis's published writings are:

- Völker der Südsee u. die Geschichte der protestantischen und katholischen Missionen unter denselben (Munster, 1847)
- Lieder aus Westfalen, edited by his brother Friedrich in 1857
- Das heilige Messopfer und das Frohnleichnamsfest in ihrer welthistorischen Bedeutung (Erfurt, 1841)
