= Michaelis–Becker reaction =

Chemical reaction

The Michaelis–Becker reaction is the reaction of a hydrogen (thio)phosphonate with a base, followed by a nucleophilic substitution of phosphorus on a haloalkane, to give an alkyl (thio)phosphonate. Yields of this reaction are often lower than the corresponding Michaelis–Arbuzov reaction.

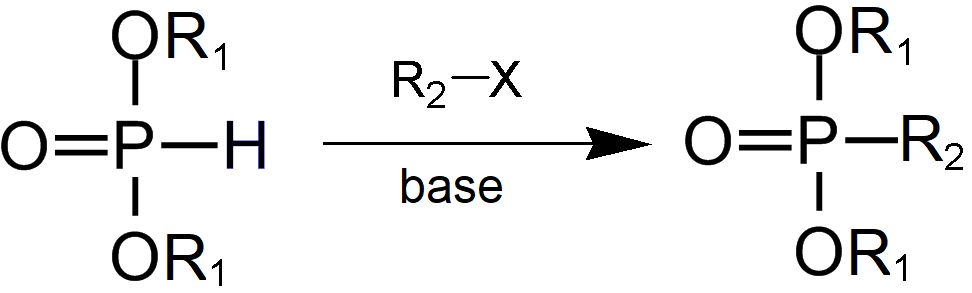
