= Carl Conrad Theodor Litzmann =

German obstetrician and gynecologist

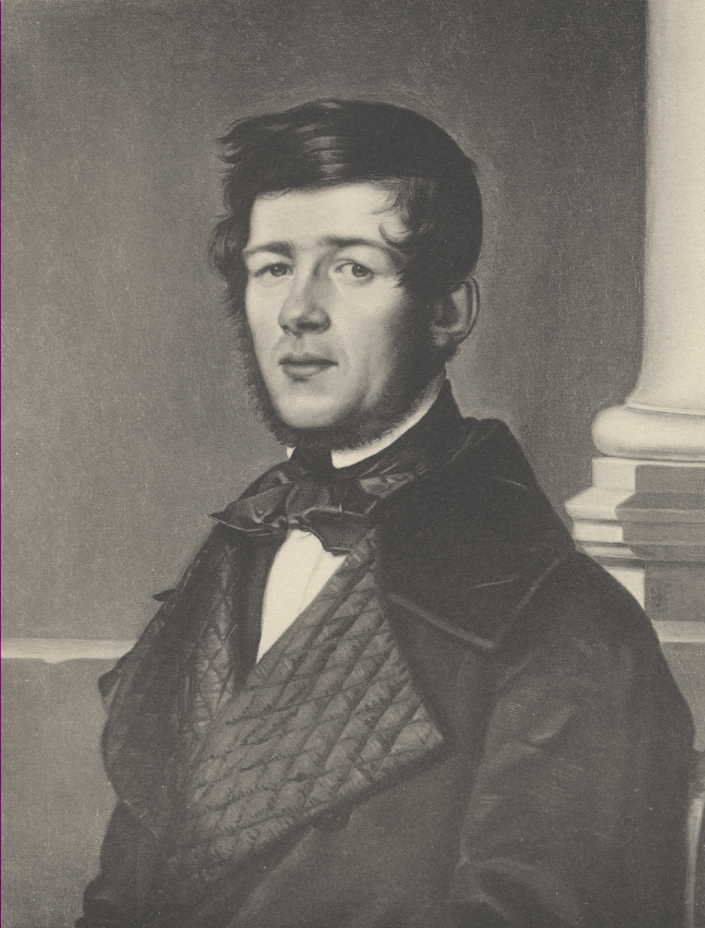
Carl Conrad Theodor Litzmann.

Carl Conrad Theodor Litzmann (7 October 1815 – 24 February 1890) was a German obstetrician and gynecologist born in Gadebusch, Grand Duchy of Mecklenburg-Schwerin.

He studied medicine in Halle, Würzburg and Berlin. In 1845 became an associate professor at the University of Greifswald, where during the following year he was appointed professor of general pathology and therapy. During this time period he published a study on the physiology of pregnancy titled "Physiologie der Schwangerschaft und des weiblichen Organismus überhaupt" (1846). In 1849 he became a professor of obstetrics and director of the Frauenklinik in Kiel. In 1862 he received the title of Etatsrat.

In 1862 his treatise on osteomalacia, "Beiträge zur Kenntniss der Osteomalacie", was translated into English and published as "Contributions to the knowledge of osteomalacia".

He is remembered for his work in pelvimetry, and among his better written efforts was an edition of Gustav Adolf Michaelis' "Das Enge Becken: nach eigenen Beobachtungen und Untersuchungen" (The narrow pelvis, from personal observations and investigations). In 1884 Litzmann published "Die Geburt bei engem Becken: nach eigenen Beobachtungen und Untersuchungen" (The birth involving the narrow pelvis, from personal observations and investigations).

In 1885 he returned to Berlin, where he devoted his time to literary pursuits. In this regard, he published "E Geibel, aus Erinnerungen, Briefen und Tagebüchern" (Emanuel Geibel, from memories, letters and diaries; 1887) and "Friedrich Hölderlins Leben in Briefen von und an Hölderlin" (Friedrich Hölderlin's life, in letters to and from Hölderlin; 1890).

His name is lent to "Litzmann's obliquity", which is another name for posterior asynclitism.
