= Hirao coupling =

| Named after | Toshikazu Hirao |
| Reaction type | Coupling reaction |

In organic chemistry, Hirao coupling is a chemical reaction for the formation of carbon-phosphorus bonds using palladium cross-coupling. Hirao coupling expands the scope of carbon-phosphorus bond formation from alkyl (sp^{3}) carbon-phosphorus bonds to sp^{2} (alkenyl and aryl) carbon-phosphorus bonds. This builds on previous work by August Michaelis and Alexandr Arbuzov, who developed the Michaelis-Arbuzov reaction to deliver alkyl phosphonates from alkyl halides and phosphinites in 1898. Earlier work used nickel halides (NiX_{2}, X = Cl, Br) as catalysts at high temperatures to achieve vinyl phosphonates, but these reactions often proceeded in low yields and poor stereoselectivity.

== History ==
The original work by Toshikazu Hirao et al. was published in 1980 and is the first example of synthesis of vinyl phosphonates using Palladium Cross-coupling. The general reaction scheme is shown below, and is stereoselective. The reaction has gained popularity due to a lack of other efficient synthetic pathways such as direct nucleophilic substitution. Hirao expanded on his motif to include aryl halides (Ar-X, X = Br, I) in 1981, and internal alkenes in 1983 using the same reaction conditions. Steric interference of the alkenyl R groups severely reduces yields of the cross coupling for internal alkenes as opposed to terminal alkenes, however. Notably, aryl and alkenyl chlorides are unreactive under these conditions. The methodology has grown since the initial work by Hirao.

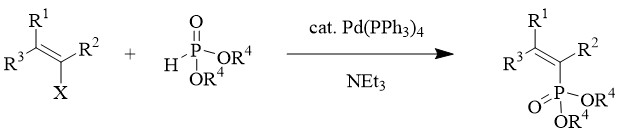
Stereoselective Synthesis of Vinylphosphonates.

Due to the high cost of tetrakis(triphenylphosphine)palladium(0), an early modification made was the switch to cheaper palladium sources, such as Palladium (II) acetate. Palladium(II) acetate readily undergoes reduction in the presence traditional bases such as triethylamine and cesium carbonate to form the active palladium(0) catalyst. Taking advantage of the chelate effect, bidentate phosphorus ligands such as 1,1'-Bis(diphenylphosphino)ferrocene are used in place of bis(triphenylphosphine) as ancillary L-type ligands. Ligand scope has also been improved to include a variety of aryl chlorides and aryl pseudohalides. Another area of research has been the development of "greener" reaction conditions: lower temperatures and milder reagents. Finally, work by Buchwald, Fu, and Han has shown that palladium can be effectively replaced by copper or nickel.

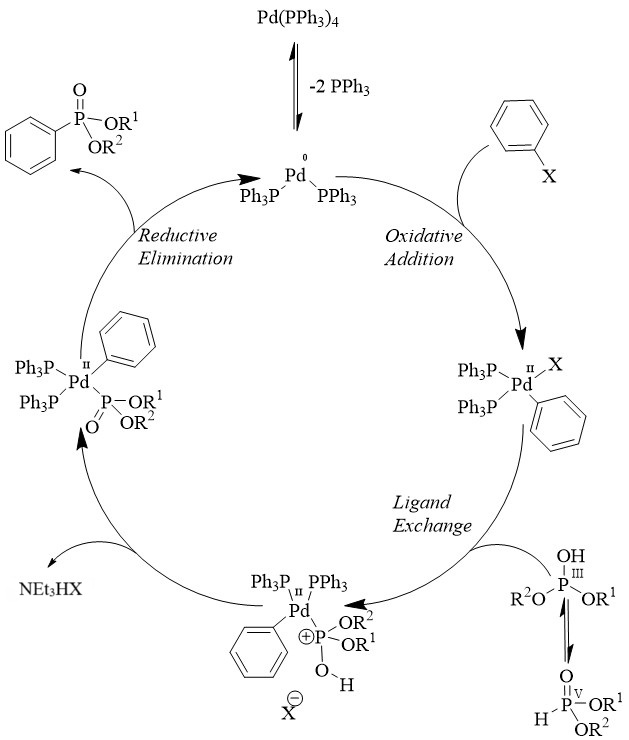
Catalytic Cycle for Palladium-Catalyzed Hirao Coupling of Aryl Halides with Phosphites (X = Br, I)

== Mechanism ==
The reaction mechanism has been shown to be similar to other palladium catalyzed cross coupling reactions. In the case of tetrakis(triphenylphosphine)palladium(0), the first step is the dissociation of two triphenylphosphine ligands to create the 14-electron intermediate Pd(PPh_{3})_{2}. In all cases, palladium must have an oxidation state of 0 at the beginning of the catalytic cycle. Therefore, for palladium catalysts that start in higher oxidation states, such as PdCl_{2} must first be reduced. This is often achieved using reagents that can undergo beta-hydride elimination, such as triethylamine.

Oxidative addition of the aryl halide forms a palladium-carbon and palladium-halide bond, and changes palladium's oxidation state to +2. Ligand exchange swaps the palladium-halide bond for a palladium-phosphorus bond. Despite the tautomerization between the P(III) and P(V) forms to allow nucleophilic attack of the palladium by phosphorus, this reaction is stereoretentive with respect to the P-stereogenic center. Reductive elimination of the phosphonate regenerates the palladium catalyst.

An unproductive side reaction, originally reported by Hirao, is the reduction pathway. For dialkylphosphites, this side reaction is largely marginalized due to the mild reductant nature of the phosphorus species. Hypophosphorus compounds such as anilinium hypophosphite (AHP) are much stronger reductants, however, and therefore are much more prone to this unproductive side reaction.

Jean-Luc Montchamp has pioneered much of the work on investigating and discouraging this unproductive reduction, which is proposed to proceed via the following pathway:

Reduction Mechanism Postulated by Montchamp.

Montchamp has reported that the oxidative addition step is competitive between addition of the palladium to the Ar-X bond and the P-H bond. Therefore the two main methods of control for are tuning the polarity of the Ar-X bond and the electronic effects of the ancillary ligand(s) on the palladium catalyst. For example, aryl iodide bonds, being relatively facile, outcompete phosphorus-hydrogen bonds for oxidative addition to Pd(PPh_{3})_{2}. In the case of X = Br, Cl, OTf, however, it is necessary to use a stronger electron donating and chelating ancillary ligand such as dppp to encourage productive oxidative addition.

== Scope ==
The scope of carbon-phosphorus bond formation has been significantly expanded since the discovery of the original work by Hirao. Subsequent work has had three main areas of focus: increasing the amount of leaving groups that can be activated, optimizing the ancillary ligands on the palladium metal, and changing the metal catalyst.

Several groups, recognizing the value of tertiary phosphine oxides and their reduced phospine derivatives as organometallic ligands, have worked on applying Hirao coupling to secondary phosphine oxides. Nakano et al. developed such a reaction with substituted phenyl substituents on the phosphine. Zhou and co-workers extended this to cyclohexyl substituted phosphines, and Shang-Dong Yang's research group have published results using alkyl substituted phosphines.

Andrew Sutherland has discovered an iodide-accelerated reaction using aryl nonaflates coupling to form secondary phosphine oxides. This reaction is notable due to the short reaction times (4-7 hours), which are theorized to be achieved due to stabilization of positively charged palladium intermediates by an iodide counterion.

György Keglevich's research group has done work on microwave-assisted cross coupling of diaryl phosphine oxides, dialkyl phosphites, and dialkyl phosphinates with the normally unreactive chlorobenzene. These reactions have the added benefit of proceeding without need for ancillary phosphorus ligands, as the P(III) tautomer of the phosphorus starting material is coordinated to the palladium. Additionally, the phosphorus starting material can act as the reducing agent for palladium(II) pre-catalysts. These modifications allow for greater atom economy, contributing to the creation of a more environmentally friendly reaction.

Fu-She Han and co-workers have introduced a nickel catalyzed version of the reaction, coupling dialkyl phosphites, diarylphosphine oxides, and even disubstituted phosphines with various aryl halides. Due to the smaller atomic radius, lower electronegativity and more negative redox potential of nickel, oxidative addition is much easier for nickel cross coupling than palladium cross coupling. This allows even the normally unreactive aryl chlorides to be open to cross coupling in high yields.

Stephen Buchwald's research group has created a copper catalyzed version of the reaction, coupling dialkyl and diaryl phosphines with aryl halides (X = Br, I). Notably, Buchwald has reported that the bulky ditertbutylphosphine is unreactive in these conditions, while the less bulky diisobutylphosphine reacts, suggesting that the steric bulk of the phosphines (rather than the aryl group) is the limiting factor for good yields in these reactions.

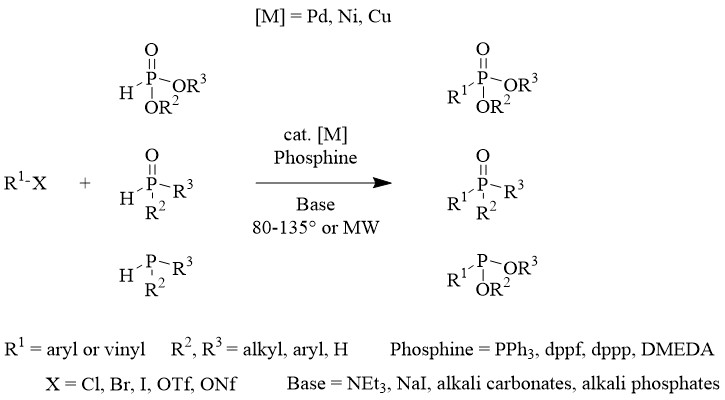
Expanded Scope of Carbon-Phosphorus Bond Formation

== Application ==
This reaction is used widely in synthetic organic chemistry, especially in the area of natural products synthesis. Carbon-phosphorus bonds are found throughout nature, and palladium catalyzed cross coupling of AHP can be used in the creation of mono-substituted phosphinic acids which act as antagonists for GABA_{C} receptors. Syntheses of Progesterone receptor antagonists, vinylphosphonate-linked nucleic acids, and phosphorus analogs of aryl-morpholinols have also been described.

Tertiary phosphines are incredibly useful ligands in organometallic chemistry due to their strong ligation properties, and formation of their P(V) phosphine oxide analogs is easily achieved using this reaction. Yang et al. have showed formation of triarylphosphine oxides to use as directing groups for palladium-catalyzed carbon-hydrogen bond acetoxylation. Reduction of the P(V) phosphine oxide to the free P(III) tertiary phosphine can be achieved in relatively mild conditions, and Phillip Jolly's research has taken advantage of this to provide syntheses of many Buchwald ligands and Grubbs catalyst M202.

== Variations ==
Since Hirao's original work in the 1980s, many other groups have expanded and optimized the applicability of the reaction. There have since been many variations discovered to help synthesize a wide variety of relevant compounds, such as biologically active molecules, agrochemicals, and pharmaceuticals.

Casalnuovo and Calabrese worked in 1989 to create a water-soluble variation of palladium catalyzed carbon phosphorus bond formation. While originally applied to a wide variety of palladium cross-couplings, they also applied it to the Hirao cross-coupling which gave them excellent results. This water-soluble palladium catalyst allows for easy separation of product from the catalyst which allows for efficient catalyst recycling, as well as enhancing the environmental sustainability. The reaction is run in a water-acetonitrile biphasic mixture and gives yields as high as 100%. Additionally, the reaction only needs to run for 2 hours at room temperature in order to get excellent yields. The catalyst is a modified version of tetrakis(triphenylphosphine)palladium(0), where one of the phenyl rings on the phosphorus is replaced with an aryl sulfonate salt. This ionic character allows for the palladium catalyst to be water soluble. Only a small amount of leaching of the catalyst into the organic layer was noticed.

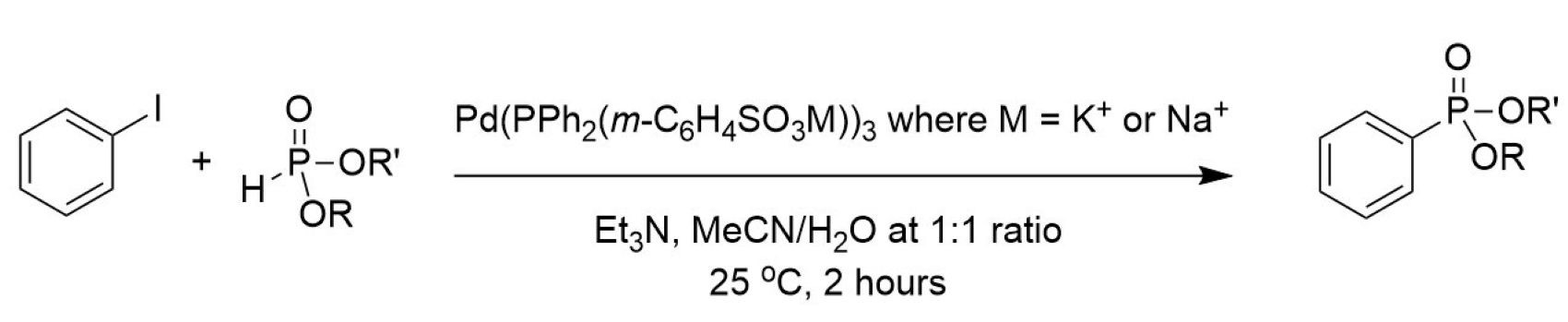
Water-Soluble Hirao Coupling

Another notable variation of the Hirao reaction is to the synthesis of aryl phosphinylmethylphosphonates. These compounds, also known as PMPs, play an important biological role as mimics for pyrophosphates. Because of this, various PMPs have been shown to display biological activity. However, their prior syntheses involved a limited substrate scope, lengthy syntheses, as well as a lack of late-stage functionalization. In 2002 Luke and Shakespeare utilized Hirao coupling for the formation of aryl PMPs, where the key step of formation is the coupling of an sp^{2} carbon with a phosphorus atom. This allows for the more efficient synthesis of aryl PMPs, as well as applicability to a wider variety of analogues.

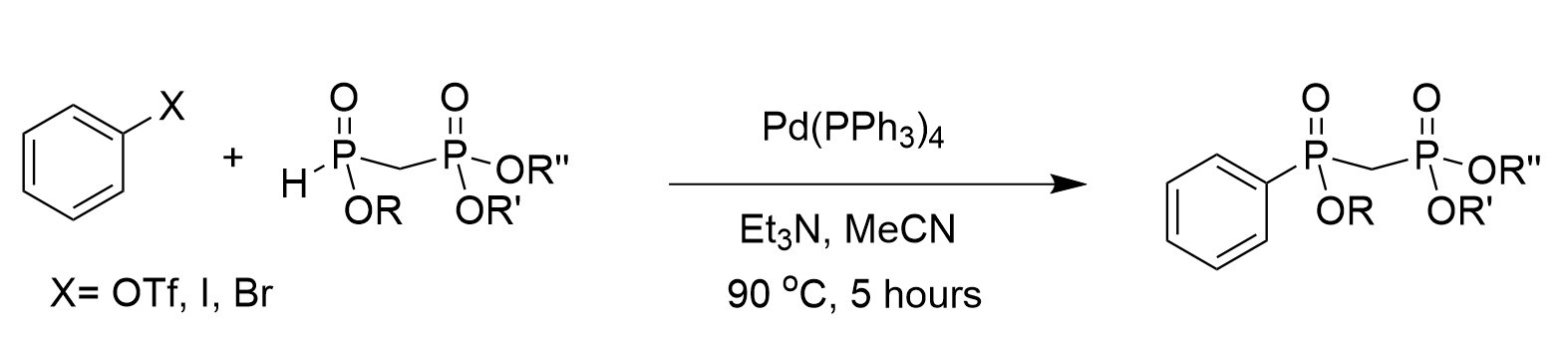
Formation of aryl PMP with Hirao Coupling

More recent advances have greatly broadened the scope to now include amides and carboxylic acids as coupling partners. In 2017, Szostak et al. reported a method of decarbonylative phosphonation of amides, using a Pd(OAc)_{2} catalyst, along with catalytic amounts of 1,4-bis(diphenylphosphino)butane.

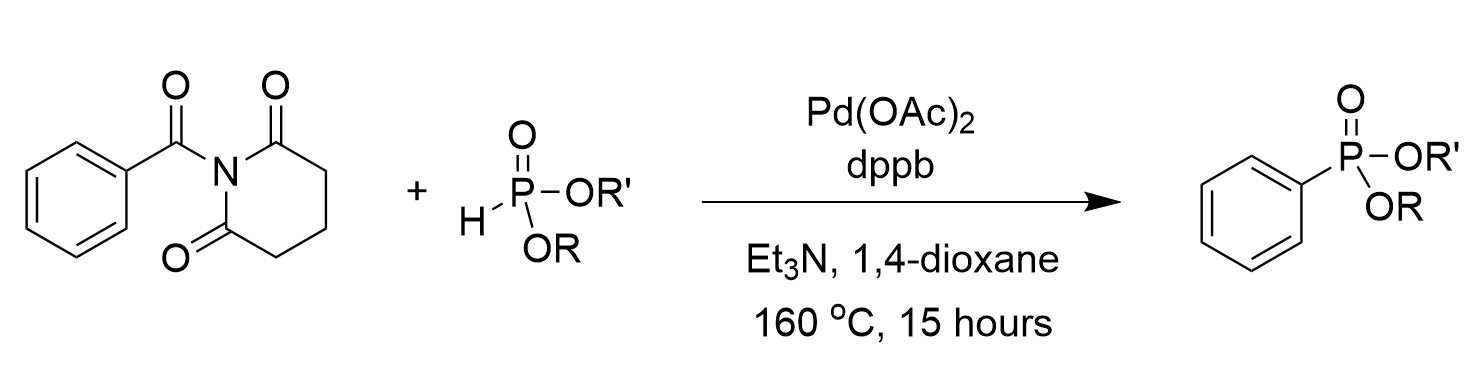
Decarbonylative Hirao Coupling

Amides, due to the high reactivity of the N-C(O) bond towards oxidative insertion onto the palladium, will preferentially react in palladium cross coupling. This means the aryl ring can contain functional groups such as halides, pseudohalides, esters, and sulfonates without suffering alternate products from side reactions. Overall, this new extension allows for high chemoselectivity of the catalyst. In 2023, Liu et al. extended this type of decarbonylative phosphonation to include carboxylic acids as well. This reaction relies on a dehydrogenative and decarbonylative mechanism in which the active intermediate is a carboxylic-phosphoric anhydride.
