= Gustav Adolf Michaelis =

German obstetrician

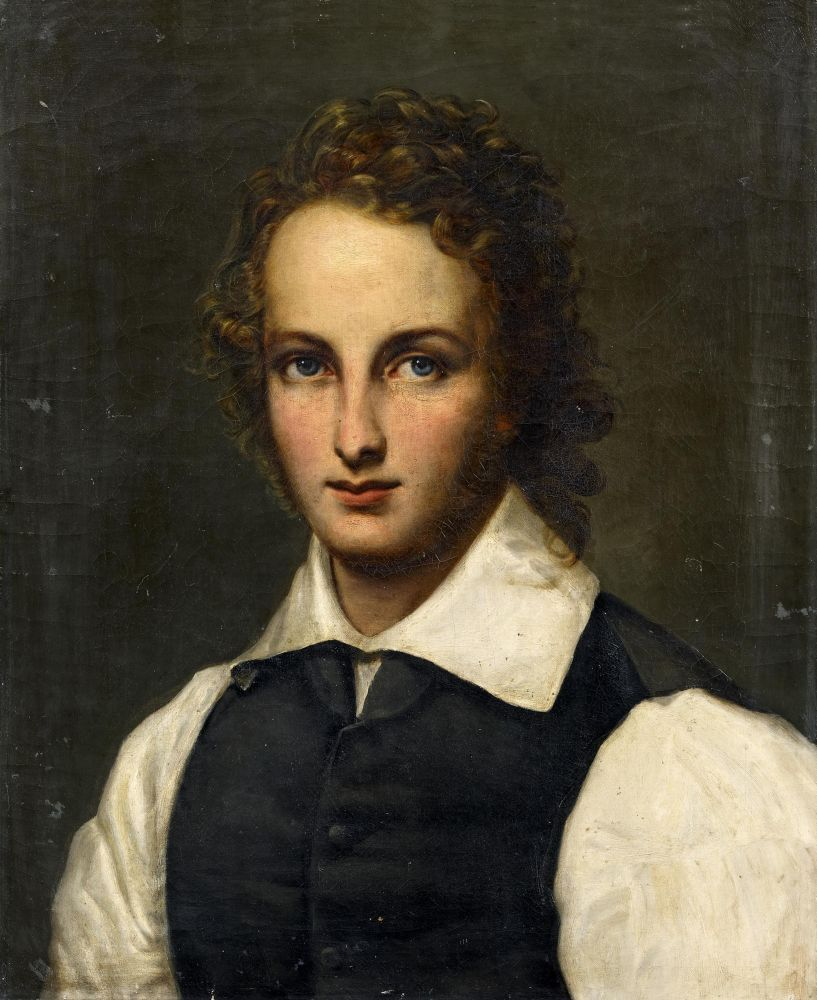
Gustav Adolf Michaelis, oil painting by Karl Aubel in 1820

Gustav Adolf Michaelis (9 July 1798 – 8 August 1848) was a German obstetrician who was a native of Kiel.

== Biography ==
=== Education and career ===
Gustav Adolf Michaelis was born on the 9th of July, 1798, to an obstetrician Gottfried Philipp Michaelis. Gustav's uncle Christian Rudolf Wiedemann also was an obstetrician, after Philipp's death in 1811 he raised his nephew. Gustav Michaelis graduated from Kiel medical school in 1820 and continued his medical studies in Paris. Among his teachers were Konrad Johann Martin Langenbeck (1776–1851) and obstetrician Friedrich Benjamin Osiander (1759–1822). In 1823 he returned to Kiel and served as an assistant to his uncle, who held the position of director at the city lying-in hospital.

In 1828 he married Julia Jahn, a musician. In 1829 she gave birth to daughter Emma. In 1835 son Adolf Michaelis was born; he went on to become a prominent archaeologist.

In 1836 Michaelis was promoted to a city chief physician. In 1841 he inherited from his uncle the director's post at local maternity hospital. A year later he started reading lectures in local medical school, also established by Christian Rudolf Wiedemann.

=== Discoveries ===
Michaelis was a pioneer of scientific obstetrics, remembered for his work in the field of pelvimetry. He performed extensive research on difficulties associated with a "narrow pelvis" and its relationship to childbirth, of which he documented in a treatise called Das Enge Becken: Nach eigenen Beobachtungen und Untersuchungen. The book was published four years after his death by his successor Theodor Litzman. The rhombus of Michaelis, named after him, is a contour in the coccyx/sacrum region that is rhombus-shaped. Sometimes it is referred to as the "quadrilateral of Michaelis".

Michaelis had a wide range of interests, he studied archaeology and mathematics. In 1830 he published his work Über das Leuchten der Ostsee, where for the first time described the fluorescent microorganisms in the Baltic Sea.

=== Michaelis and Semmelweis ===
After being informed of Ignaz Semmelweis's theory of prophylaxis for prevention of puerperal fever, Michaelis was one of the first obstetricians to adopt the practice of compulsory chlorine handwashing. He later became severely depressed over the number of women (including a beloved niece) who had died from puerperal fever due to unsanitary obstetrical practices, and on 8 August 1848, Michaelis committed suicide in Lehrte, Germany.

=== Legacy ===
After his death, his position at Kiel was filled by Carl Conrad Theodor Litzmann (1815–1890). Today, the "Michaelis Midwifery School" at the University of Kiel is named in his honor.

== Sources ==
- Adamowsky, N. (2016). The Mysterious Science of the Sea, 1775–1943. New York: Routledge. p. 52. ISBN 978-1-84893-532-7.
- Baskett, Thomas F. (2019). Eponyms and Names in Obstetrics and Gynaecology. Cambridge: Cambridge University Press. pp. 282–283. ISBN 978-1-108-42170-6.
- Grigorieva, K. N. (2019). "Gustav Adolf Michaelis (1798–1848)". Obstetrics, Gynaecology and Reproduction (in Russian). 13 (4). ISSN 2500-3194.
- Neitzke, G.; Hoffmann, St. (1999). "Gustav Adolph Michaelis – Physician, Researcher, Teacher". Der Gynäkologe (in German). 32 (8): 660–664. doi:10.1007/PL00003279. S2CID 24819969.
- Palmisano, Donald J. (2011). On Leadership: Essential Principles for Business, Political, and Personal. New York. ISBN 978-1-61608-231-4.
- Radcliffe, Walter (1989). Milestones in Midwifery. San Francisco: Norman Publishing. pp. 79–80. ISBN 9780930405205.
- Semmelweis, Ignaz (1983). The Etiology, Concept, and Prophylaxis of Childbed Fever. Wisconsin: The University of Wisconsin. ISBN 0-299-09360-3.

== Links ==
- Dorlands Medical Dictionary (definition of eponym)
