= Phosphonate =

Organic compound containing C–PO(OR)2 groups

General ester of phosphonic acid; in fact, the phosphorus has a formal charge of +1, the oxygen above it has a formal charge of −1, and the bond between them is single.

In organic chemistry, phosphonates or phosphonic acids are organophosphorus compounds containing C−PO(OR)_{2} groups, where R is an organic group (alkyl, aryl). If R is hydrogen then the compound is a dialkyl phosphite, which is a different functional group. Phosphonic acids, typically handled as salts, are generally nonvolatile solids that are poorly soluble in organic solvents, but soluble in water and common alcohols.

Many commercially important compounds are phosphonates, including glyphosate (the active molecule of the herbicide Roundup), and ethephon, a widely used plant growth regulator. Bisphosphonates are popular drugs for treatment of osteoporosis.

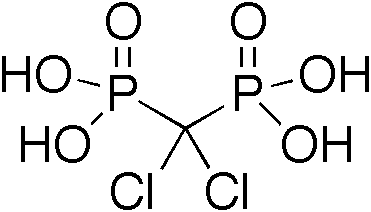
Clodronic acid is a bisphosphonate used as a drug to treat osteoporosis.

In biochemistry and medicinal chemistry, phosphonate groups are used as stable bioisosteres for phosphate, such as in the antiviral nucleotide analog, Tenofovir, one of the cornerstones of anti-HIV therapy. And there is an indication that phosphonate derivatives are "promising ligands for nuclear medicine."

== Basic properties ==
Phosphonates feature tetrahedral phosphorus centers. They are structurally closely related to (and often prepared from) phosphorous acid.

Phosphonic acids and derivatives are chemically and structurally related to phosphorous acid.

Phosphonate salts are the result of deprotonation of phosphonic acids, which are diprotic acids:

RPO(OH)_{2} + NaOH → H_{2}O + RPO(OH)(ONa) (monosodium phosphonate)
RPO(OH)(ONa) + NaOH → H_{2}O + RPO(ONa)_{2} (disodium phosphonate)

Phosphonate esters are the result of condensation of phosphonic acids with alcohols.

== Synthesis ==
Several methods exist for the preparation of phosphonic acids and their salts.

=== From phosphonic acid ===
Most processes begin with phosphorous acid (aka phosphonic acid, H_{3}PO_{3}), exploiting its reactive P−H bond.

Phosphonic acid can be alkylated via the Kabachnik–Fields reaction or Pudovik reaction to give aminophosphonate, which are useful as chelating agents. One example is the industrial preparation of nitrilotris(methylenephosphonic acid):

NH_{3} + 3 H_{3}PO_{3} + 3 CH_{2}O → N(CH_{2}PO_{3}H_{2})_{3} + 3 H_{2}O

Phosphonic acid also can be alkylated with acrylic acid derivatives to afford carboxyl functionalized phosphonic acids. This reaction is a variant of the Michael addition:

CH_{2}=CHCO_{2}R + 3 H_{3}PO_{3} → (HO)_{2}P(O)CH_{2}CH_{2}CO_{2}R

In the Hirao coupling dialkyl phosphites (which can also be viewed as di-esters of phosphonic acid: (O=PH(OR)_{2}) undergo a palladium-catalyzed coupling reaction with an aryl halide to form a phosphonate.

=== Michaelis-Arbuzov reaction ===
Phosphonic esters are prepared using the Michaelis–Arbuzov reaction. For example, methyl iodide catalyses the conversion of trimethylphosphite to the phosphonate ester dimethyl methylphosphonate:

P(OMe)_{3} → MePO(OMe)_{2}

These esters can be hydrolysed to the acid (Me = methyl):

MePO(OMe)_{2} + H_{2}O → MePO(OH)_{2} + 2 MeOH

In the Michaelis–Becker reaction, a hydrogen phosphonate diester is first deprotonated and the resulting anion is alkylated.

=== From phosphorus trichloride ===
Vinylphosphonic acid can be prepared by the reaction of PCl_{3} and acetaldehyde:

PCl_{3} + CH_{3}CHO → CH_{3}CH(O^{−})PCl^{+}_{3}

This adduct reacts with acetic acid:

CH_{3}CH(O^{−})PCl^{+}_{3} + 2 CH_{3}CO_{2}H → CH_{3}CH(Cl)PO(OH)_{2} + 2 CH_{3}COCl

This chloride undergoes dehydrochlorination to afford the target:

CH_{3}CH(Cl)PO(OH)_{2} → CH_{2}=CHPO(OH)_{2} + HCl

In the Kinnear–Perren reaction alkylphosphonyl dichlorides and esters are generated by alkylation of phosphorus trichloride in the presence of aluminium trichloride. Alkyltrichlorophosphonium salts are intermediates:

PCl_{3} + RCl + AlCl_{3} → RPCl^{+}_{3} + AlCl^{−}_{4}

The RPCl^{+}_{3} product can then be decomposed with water to produce an alkylphosphonic dichloride RP(=O)Cl_{2}.

== Reactions ==
=== Hydrolysis ===
Phosphonate esters are generally susceptible to hydrolysis under both acidic and basic conditions. Cleavage of the P-C bond is harder but can be achieved under aggressive conditions.

O=PC(OR)_{2} + 2 H_{2}O → O=PC(OH)_{2} + 2 ROH

=== Horner–Wadsworth–Emmons reaction ===
In the Horner–Wadsworth–Emmons reaction dialkyl-phosphonates are deprotonated to give stabilized carbanions, which react with aldehydes to give E-alkenes with elimination of a dialkyl-phosphate.

The Horner–Wadsworth–Emmons reaction

== Structural sub-classes ==
=== Bisphosphonates ===
General structure of biphosphonates

Compounds containing 2 geminal phosphonate groups are known as bisphosphonates. They were first synthesized in 1897 by Von Baeyer and Hofmann and now form the basis for an important class of drugs, used to treat osteoporosis and similar diseases. Examples include HEDP (etidronic acid or Didronel), which is prepared from phosphorous acid and acetic anhydride:

2 H_{3}PO_{3} + (CH_{3}CO)_{2}O → CH_{3}C(OH)(PO_{3}H_{2})_{2} + CH_{3}CO_{2}H

=== Thiophosphonates ===
EMPTA (Thione)

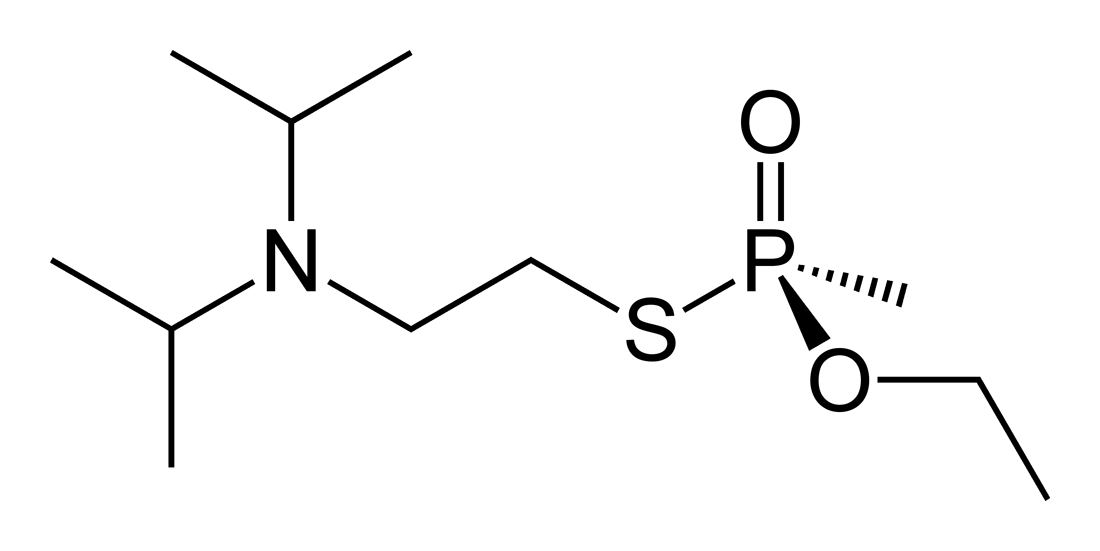
VX (Thiol)

A thiophosphonate group is a functional group related to phosphonate by substitution of an oxygen atom for a sulphur. They are a reactive component of many pesticides and nerve agents. Substituted thiophosphonates can have two main structural isomers bonding though either O or S groups to give thione and thiol forms respectively. This is a property they share with related functional groups such as thiocarboxylic acids and organothiophosphates.

=== Phosphonamidates ===
Phosphonamidates are related to phosphonates by substitution of an oxygen atom for a nitrogen. They are a rarely encountered functional group. The nerve agent Tabun is an example.

== Occurrence in nature ==
Glyphosate, part of the herbicide "Roundup", is a phosphonate.

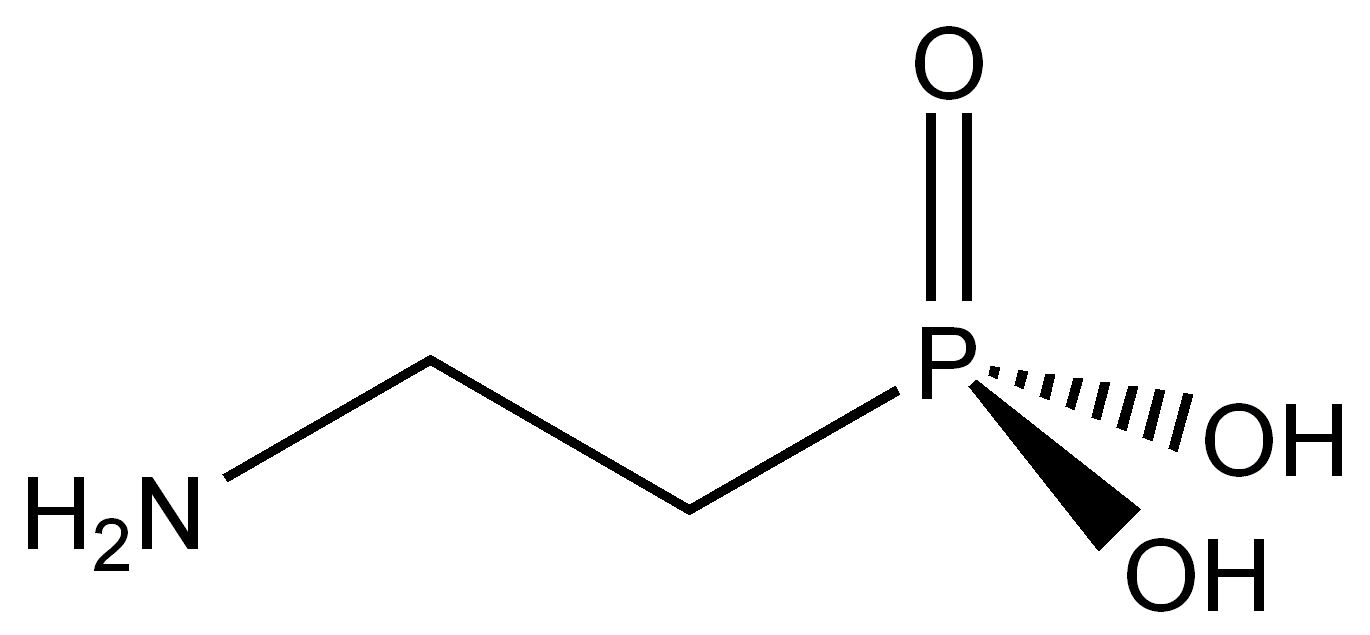
2-aminoethylphosphonic acid: the first identified natural phosphonate

Phosphonates are one of the three sources of phosphate intake in biological cells. The other two are inorganic phosphate and organophosphates.

The naturally occurring phosphonate 2-aminoethylphosphonic acid was first identified in 1959 in plants and many animals, where it is localized in membranes. Phosphonates are quite common among different organisms, from prokaryotes to eubacteria and mushrooms, mollusks, insects and others. They were first reported in natural soils by Newman and Tate (1980). The biological role of the natural phosphonates is still poorly understood. Bis- or polyphosphonates have not been found to occur naturally.

A number of natural product phosphonate substances with antibiotic properties have been identified. Phosphonate natural product antibiotics include fosfomycin which is approved by FDA for the treatment of non-complicated urinary tract infection as well as several pre-clinically investigated substances such as Fosmidomycin (inhibitor isoprenyl synthase), SF-2312 (inhibitor of the glycolytic enzyme enolase, and substances of unknown mode of actions such as alahopcin. Although phosphonates are profoundly cell impermeable, natural product phosphonate antibiotics are effective against a number of organisms, because many bacterial species express glycerol-3-phosphate and glucose-6-phosphate importers, which can be hijacked by phosphonate antibiotics. Fosfomycin resistant bacterial strains frequently have mutations that inactivate these transporters; however, such mutations are not maintained in the absence of antibiotic because of the fitness cost they impose.

== Uses ==
In 1998 the consumption of phosphonates was 56,000 tons worldwide – 40,000 tons in the US, 15,000 tons in Europe and less than 800 tons in Japan. The demand of phosphonates grows steadily at 3% annually.

=== Metal chelants ===
Since the work of Gerold Schwarzenbach in 1949, phosphonic acids are known as effective chelating agents. The introduction of an amine group into the molecule to obtain −NH_{2}−C−PO(OH)_{2} increases the metal binding abilities of the phosphonate. Examples for such compounds are NTMP, EDTMP and DTPMP. These phosphonates are the structural analogues to the well-known aminopolycarboxylate such as EDTA. The stability of the metal complexes increases with increasing number of phosphonic acid groups. Phosphonates are highly water-soluble while the phosphonic acids are only sparingly so.

Phosphonates are effective chelating agents. That is, they bind tightly to di- and trivalent metal ions, which is useful in water softening. In this way, they prevent formation of insoluble precipitates (scale). The binding of these ligands also suppresses the catalytic properties of metal ions. They are stable under harsh conditions. For these reasons, an important industrial use of phosphonates is in cooling waters, desalination systems, and in oil fields to inhibit scale formation. Phosphonates are also regularly used in reverse osmosis systems as antiscalants. Phosphonates in cooling water systems also serve to control corrosion of iron and steel. In pulp and paper manufacturing and in textile industry they serve as "peroxide bleach stabilizers", by chelating metals that could inactivate the peroxide. In detergents they are used as a combination of chelating agent, scale inhibitor, and bleach stabilizer. Phosphonates are also increasingly used in medicine to treat disorders associated with bone formation and calcium metabolism. Furthermore, they serve as carriers for radionuclides in bone cancer treatments (see samarium-153-ethylene diamine tetramethylene phosphonate).

=== Concrete admixtures ===
Phosphonates are also used as concrete retarder. They delay the cement setting time, allowing a longer time to place the concrete or to spread the cement hydration heat on a longer period of time to avoid too high temperature and resulting cracks. They also have favourable dispersing properties and so are investigated as a possible new class of superplasticizers. However, presently, phosphonates are not commercially available as superplasticizers. Superplasticizers are concrete admixtures designed to increase the concrete fluidity and workability of concrete or to decrease its water-to-cement (w/c) ratio. By reducing the water content in concrete, it decreases its porosity, improving so the mechanical properties (compressive and tensile strength) and the durability of concrete (lower water, gas and solutes transport properties).

=== Warheads in proteomics ===
Phosphonates and specially diarylphosphonates are also reported to be used as "warhead" or reactive site in proteomics analysis.

== Medicine ==
In medicine, phosphonates and bisphosphonates are commonly used as inhibitors of enzymes which utilize phosphates and diphosphates as substrates. Most notably, these enzymes include those that produce the intermediates of cholesterol biosynthesis.

Phosphonate nucleotide analogues such as tenofovir, cidofovir and adefovir are critical antiviral medications, which in various pro-drug forms are used for the treatment of HIV, hepatitis B and others.

=== Niche uses ===
In conjunction with organosilicates, phosphonates are also used to treat "sudden oak death", which is caused by the fungus-like eukaryote Phytophthora ramorum.

== Toxicology ==
The toxicity of phosphonates to organisms living in water is low. Reported values for 48-hour LC_{50} values for fish are between 0.1 and 1.1 mM. Also the bioconcentration factor for fish is very low.

== Biodegradation ==
In nature bacteria play a major role in the degradation of phosphonates. Due to the presence of natural phosphonates in the environment, bacteria have evolved the ability to metabolize phosphonates as nutrient sources. Some bacteria use phosphonates as a phosphorus source for growth. Aminophosphonates can also be used as sole nitrogen source by some bacteria. The polyphosphonates used in industry differ greatly from natural phosphonates such as 2-aminoethylphosphonic acid, because they are much larger, carry a high negative charge and are complexed with metals. Biodegradation tests with sludge from municipal sewage treatment plants with HEDP and NTMP showed no indication for any degradation. An investigation of HEDP, NTMP, EDTMP and DTPMP in standard biodegradation tests also failed to identify any biodegradation. It was noted, however, that in some tests due to the high sludge to phosphonate ratio, removal of the test substance from solution observed as loss of DOC was observed. This factor was attributed to adsorption rather than biodegradation. However, bacterial strains capable of degrading aminopolyphosphonates and HEDP under P-limited conditions have been isolated from soils, lakes, wastewater, activated sludge and compost.

"No biodegradation of phosphonates during water treatment is observed but photodegradation of the Fe(III)-complexes is rapid. Aminopolyphosphonates are also rapidly oxidized in the presence of Mn(II) and oxygen and stable breakdown products are formed that have been detected in wastewater. The lack of information about phosphonates in the environment is linked to analytical problems of their determination at trace concentrations in natural waters. Phosphonates are present mainly as Ca and Mg-complexes in natural waters and therefore do not affect metal speciation or transport." Phosphonates interact strongly with some surfaces, which results in a significant removal in technical and natural systems.

== Phosphonate compounds ==
- Tenofovir alafenamide: A pro-drug of the nucleotide analogue tenofovir, critical for HIV treatment.
- AMPA: Aminomethylphosphonic acid, degradation product of glyphosate
- Vinylphosphonic acid: monomer
- Dimethyl methylphosphonate (DMMP), one of the simplest phosphonate diesters
- Etidronic acid (HEDP): 1-hydroxyethylidene-1,1-diphosphonic acid, used in detergents, water treatment, cosmetics and pharmaceuticals
- ATMP: Aminotris(methylenephosphonic acid), chelating agent
- EDTMP: Ethylenediaminetetra(methylenephosphonic acid), chelating agent
- TDTMP: Tetramethylenediaminetetra(methylenephosphonic acid), chelating agent
- HDTMP: Hexamethylenediaminetetra(methylenephosphonic acid), chelating agent
- DTPMP: Diethylenetriaminepenta(methylenephosphonic acid), chelating agent
- PBTC: Phosphonobutanetricarboxylic acid
- PMIDA: N-(phosphonomethyl)iminodiacetic acid
- CEPA: 2-carboxyethyl phosphonic acid
- HPAA: 2-Hydroxyphosphonocarboxylic acid
- AMP: Aminotris(methylenephosphonic acid)
- BPMG: N,N-Bis(phosphonomethyl)glycine
- Glyphosate: a common agricultural herbicide
- Foscarnet: for treatment of herpes
- Perzinfotel: for treatment of stroke
- SF2312: a natural product phosphonate antibiotic inhibitor of enolase
- Selfotel: an abandoned experimental drug for stroke

== See also ==
- Organophosphorus compounds
- Phosphine oxide – OPR_{3}
- Phosphinite – P(OR)R_{2}
- Phosphonite – P(OR)_{2}R
- Phosphite – P(OR)_{3}
- Phosphinate – OP(OR)R_{2}
- Phosphate – OP(OR)_{3}
