= Diethyl phosphite =

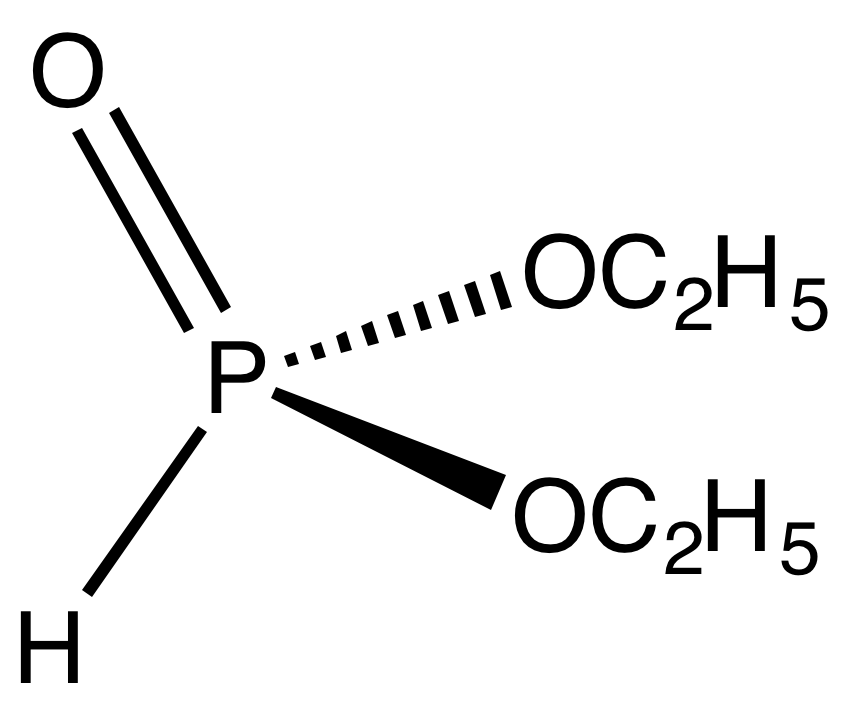

Names
- Preferred IUPAC name Diethyl phosphonate
- Other names diethyl phosphonite; DEP; Phosphonic acid, diethyl ester

Identifiers
CAS Number	762-04-9
3D model (JSmol)	Interactive image
Beilstein Reference	4-01-00-01329
ChemSpider	12437
ECHA InfoCard	100.010.992
PubChem CID	12977
UNII	U9X9YBA22W
CompTox Dashboard (EPA)	DTXSID9041861
- InChI: InChI=1S/C4H11O3P/c1-3-6-8(5)7-4-2/h5H,3-4H2,1-2H3 Key: SULWMEGSVQCTSK-UHFFFAOYSA-N
- SMILES: CCOP(OCC)=O

Properties
Chemical formula	C_{4}H_{11}O_{3}P
Molar mass	138.103 g·mol^{−1}
Appearance	colorless liquid
Density	1.072 g/cm^{3}
Boiling point	50-51 °C at 2 mm Hg
- Except where otherwise noted, data are given for materials in their standard state (at 25 °C [77 °F], 100 kPa). Infobox references

Diethyl phosphite is the organophosphorus compound with the formula (C_{2}H_{5}O)_{2}P(O)H. It is a popular reagent for generating other organophosphorus compounds, exploiting the high reactivity of the P-H bond. Diethyl phosphite is a colorless liquid. The molecule is tetrahedral.

== Synthesis and properties ==
The compound was probably prepared in the 1850s by combining phosphorus trichloride and ethanol, but intentional preparations came later. It arises as follows:

PCl_{3} + 3 C_{2}H_{5}OH → (C_{2}H_{5}O)_{2}P(O)H + 2 HCl + C_{2}H_{5}Cl

Under similar conditions but in the presence of base, triethyl phosphite results:

PCl_{3} + 3 EtOH + 3 R_{3}N → P(OEt)_{3} + 3 R_{3}NH + 3 Cl^{−}

Many analogues of diethyl phosphite can be prepared. Despite being named as a phosphite the compound exists overwhelmingly in its phosphonate form, (C_{2}H_{5}O)_{2}P(O)H, a property it shares with its parent acid phosphorous acid. Nonetheless many of its reactions appear to proceed via the minor phosphorus(III) tautomer.

(C_{2}H_{5}O)_{2}P^{III}(OH) ⇌ (C_{2}H_{5}O)_{2}P^{V}(O)H, K = 15 × 10^{6} (25°C, aqueous)

== Reactions ==
=== Hydrolysis and alcoholysis ===
Diethyl phosphite hydrolyzes to give phosphorous acid. Hydrogen chloride accelerates this conversion.:

Diethyl phosphite undergoes transesterification upon treating with an alcohol. For alcohols of high boiling points, the conversion can be driven by removal of ethanol:

(C_{2}H_{5}O)_{2}P(O)H + 2 ROH → (RO)_{2}P(O)H + 2 C_{2}H_{5}OH

Similarly amines can displace ethoxide:

(C_{2}H_{5}O)_{2}P(O)H + RNH_{2} → (C_{2}H_{5}O)(RN(H)P(O)H + C_{2}H_{5}OH

=== P-alkylation ===
Diethyl phosphite undergoes deprotonation with potassium tert-butoxide. This reactivity allows alkylation at phosphorus (Michaelis–Becker reaction):

(C_{2}H_{5}O)_{2}P(O)H + KO^{t}Bu → (C_{2}H_{5}O)_{2}P(O)K + HO^{t}Bu
(C_{2}H_{5}O)_{2}P(O)K + RBr → (C_{2}H_{5}O)_{2}P(O)R + KBr

For converting aryl halides, palladium-catalysis can be employed. The C-P coupling process is reminiscent of the Buchwald-Hartwig amination.

Reaction of diethyl phosphite with Grignard reagents results in initial deprotonation followed by displacement of the ethoxy groups. This reactivity provides a route to secondary phosphine oxides, such as dimethylphosphine oxide as shown in the following pair of idealized equations:

(C_{2}H_{5}O)_{2}P(O)H + CH_{3}MgBr → (C_{2}H_{5}O)_{2}P(O)MgBr + CH_{4}
(C_{2}H_{5}O)_{2}P(O)MgBr + 2 CH_{3}MgBr → (CH_{3})_{2}P(O)MgBr + 2 MgBr(OC_{2}H_{5})
(CH_{3})_{2}P(O)MgBr + H_{2}O → (CH_{3})_{2}P(O)H + MgBr(OH)

=== Hydrophosphonylation ===
Diethyl phosphite can add across unsaturated groups via a hydrophosphonylation reaction. For example, it adds to aldehydes in a manner similar to the Abramov reaction:

(C_{2}H_{5}O)_{2}P(O)H + RCHO → (C_{2}H_{5}O)_{2}P(O)CH(OH)R

It can also add to imines in the Pudovik reaction and Kabachnik–Fields reaction, in both cases forming aminophosphonates

== See also ==
- Dimethylphosphite
- Diisopropylphosphite
- Diphenylphosphite
