= Diphenyl phosphite =

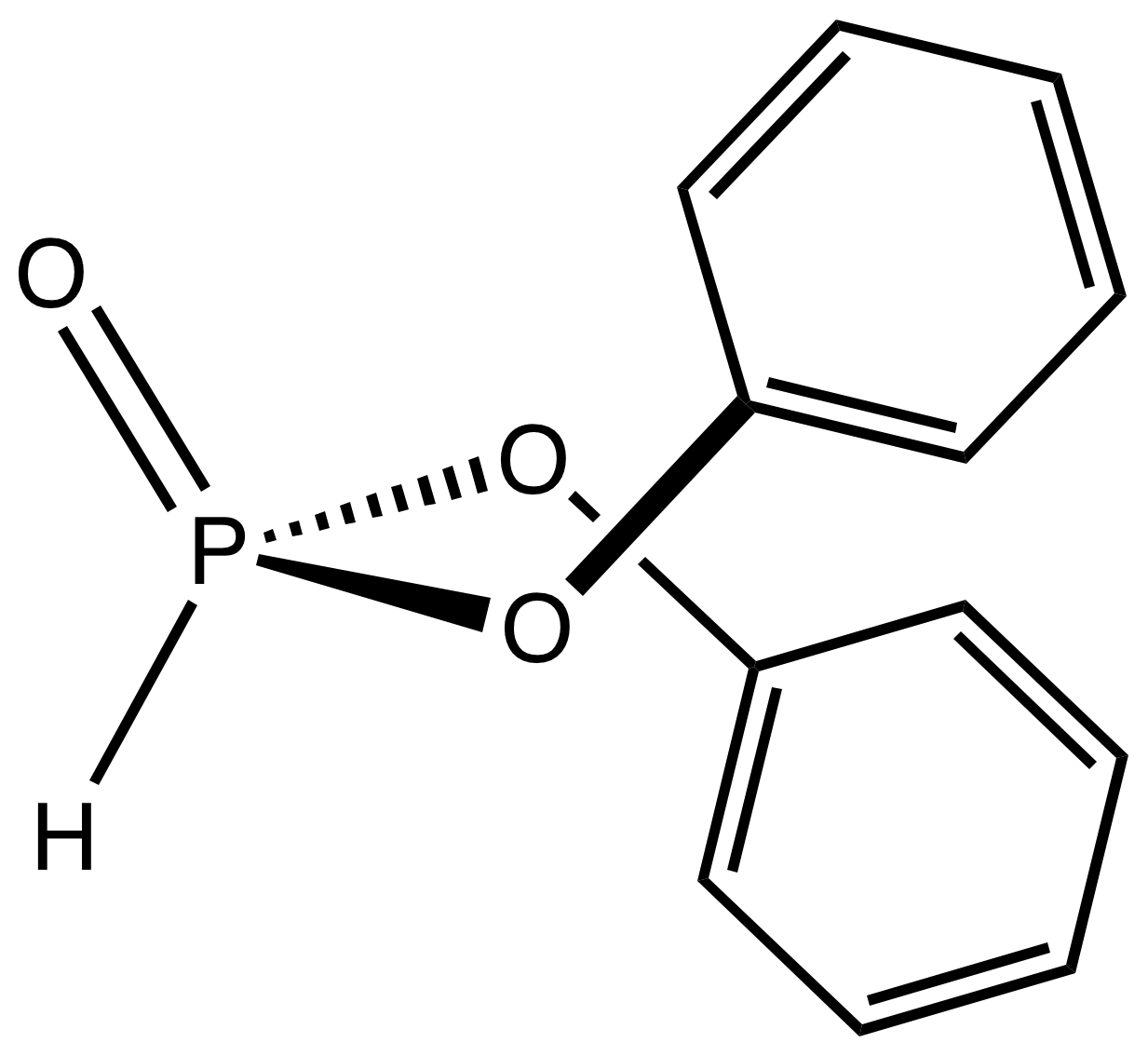

Names
- Preferred IUPAC name Diphenyl phosphonate
- Other names Phosphonic acid, diphenyl ester

Identifiers
CAS Number	4712-55-4
3D model (JSmol)	Interactive image
ChEMBL	ChEMBL132913
ChemSpider	377689
PubChem CID	426896
UNII	5144JS6XUM
- InChI: InChI=1S/C12H11O3P/c13-16(14-11-7-3-1-4-8-11)15-12-9-5-2-6-10-12/h1-10,13H Key: FYOYCZHNDCCGCE-UHFFFAOYSA-N
- SMILES: C1=CC=C(C=C1)OP(O)OC2=CC=CC=C2

Properties
Chemical formula	C_{12}H_{11}O_{3}P
Molar mass	234.191 g·mol^{−1}
Appearance	colorless liquid
Density	1.2268 g/cm^{3}
Melting point	12 °C (54 °F; 285 K)
- Except where otherwise noted, data are given for materials in their standard state (at 25 °C [77 °F], 100 kPa). Infobox references

Diphenyl phosphite is a diorganophosphite with the formula (C_{6}H_{5}O)_{2}P(O)H. The molecule is tetrahedral. It is a colorless viscous liquid. The compounds can be prepared by treating phosphorus trichloride with phenol. Many analogues can be prepared similarly. One illustrative reaction, diphenylphosphite, aldehydes, and amines react to afford aminophosphonates (Kabachnik–Fields reaction).

== See also ==
- Dimethylphosphite
- Diethylphosphite
- Diisopropylphosphite
