= Phosphine oxides =

Class of chemical compounds

General formula of organophosphine oxides

Phosphine oxides are phosphorus compounds with the formula OPX_{3}. When X = alkyl or aryl, these are organophosphine oxides. Triphenylphosphine oxide is an example. An inorganic phosphine oxide is phosphoryl chloride (POCl_{3}). The parent phosphine oxide (H_{3}PO) remains rare and obscure.

== Tertiary phosphine oxides ==
Principal resonance structures for phosphine oxides

Tertiary phosphine oxides are the commonly encountered phosphine oxides. With the formula R_{3}PO, they are tetrahedral compounds.

They are usually prepared by oxidation of tertiary phosphines. The P-O bond is short and polar. According to molecular orbital theory, the short P–O bond is attributed to the donation of the lone pair electrons from oxygen p-orbitals to the antibonding phosphorus-carbon bonds. The nature of the P–O bond was once hotly debated. Some discussions invoked a role for phosphorus-centered d-orbitals in bonding, but this analysis is not supported by computational analyses. In terms of simple Lewis structure, the bond is more accurately represented as a dative bond, as is currently used to depict an amine oxide.

=== Preparation and occurrence ===
Phosphine oxide are typically produced by oxidation of organophosphines. The oxygen in air is often sufficiently oxidizing to fully convert trialkylphosphines to their oxides at room temperature:

R_{3}P + 1/2 O_{2} → R_{3}PO

Oxidation of less basic phosphines, such as methyldiphenylphosphine can be achieved using hydrogen peroxide:

PMePh_{2} + H_{2}O_{2} → OPMePh_{2} + H_{2}O (Me = CH_{3}, Ph = C_{6}H_{5})

Phosphine oxides are by-product of the Wittig reaction:

R_{3}PCR'_{2} + R"_{2}CO → R_{3}PO + R'_{2}C=CR"_{2}

Another route to phosphine oxides is the thermolysis of phosphonium hydroxides:

[PPh_{4}]Cl + NaOH → Ph_{3}PO + NaCl + PhH

The hydrolysis of phosphorus(V) dihalides also affords the oxide:

R_{3}PCl_{2} + H_{2}O → R_{3}PO + 2 HCl

== Secondary phosphine oxides ==
Secondary phosphine oxides (SPOs), formally derived from secondary phosphines (R_{2}PH), are again tetrahedral at phosphorus. One commercially available example of a secondary phosphine oxide is diphenylphosphine oxide. SPOs are used in the formulation of catalysts for cross coupling reactions.

Unlike tertiary phosphine oxides, SPOs often undergo further oxidation:

R_{2}P(O)H + H_{2}O_{2} → R_{2}P(O)OH + H_{2}O

These reactions are preceded by tautomerization to the phosphinous acid (R_{2}POH):

R_{2}P(O)H → R_{2}POH
R_{2}POH + H_{2}O_{2} → R_{2}PO_{2}H + H_{2}O

=== Syntheses ===
A nonoxidative route is applicable secondary phosphine oxides, which arise by the hydrolysis of the chlorophosphine. An example is the hydrolysis of chlorodiphenylphosphine to give diphenylphosphine oxide:

Ph_{2}PCl + H_{2}O → Ph_{2}P(O)H + HCl

P-chiral phosphine oxides are valuable intermediates in the synthesis of P-chiral phosphines and phosphates, important as ligands in catalysis and in the synthesis of oligonucleotide drugs.

== Primary phosphine oxides ==
Primary phosphine oxides, formally oxidized derivatives of primary phosphines, are again tetrahedral at phosphorus. With four different substituents (O, OH, H, R), they are chiral. The primary phosphine oxides subject to tautomerization, which leads to racemization. Like SPO's they are susceptible to further oxidation. Primary phosphine oxides disproportionate to the phosphinic acid and the primary phosphine:

2 RP(O)H_{2} → RP(O)(H)OH + RPH_{2}
2 RP(O)H_{2} → RP(O)(H)OH + 2 RPH_{2}

== Reactions ==
Transition metal complexes of phosphine oxides are numerous.

Some phosphine oxides are well-known photoinitiators in photopolymer chemistry. UV/LED exposure induces a type I Norrish fission to free radicals, which then polymerize in a radical chain. An example is 2,4,6‑trimethylbenzoyldiphenylphosphine oxide, which absorbs around 380-410nm (near UV).

=== Deoxygenation ===
Phosphine oxide deoxygenation has been extensively developed because some useful reactions convert stoichiometric tertiary phosphines to the corresponding oxides. Regenerating the tertiary phosphines requires strongly oxophilic reagents, and can retain or invert chirality at P, depending on the reductant.

Industrial deoxygenation usually begins with treatment with phosgene or equivalents. The resulting chlorotriphenylphosphonium chloride is then reduced.

In the laboratory, phosphine oxides are usually reduced with silicon derivatives, typically inexpensive trichlorosilane. Trichlorosilane and triethylamine reduce phosphine oxides with inversion, whereas the reaction proceeds with retention absent the base:

HSiCl_{3} + Et_{3}N ⇋ SiCl_{3}^{−} + Et_{3}NH^{+}
R_{3}PO + Et_{3}NH^{+} ⇋ R_{3}POH^{+} + Et_{3}N
SiCl_{3}^{−} + R_{3}POH^{+} → PR_{3} + HOSiCl_{3}

Other perchloropolysilanes, e.g. hexachlorodisilane (Si_{2}Cl_{6}) or Si_{3}Cl_{8}, can reduce phosphine oxides and generally give higher yields:

R_{3}PO + Si_{2}Cl_{6} → R_{3}P + Si_{2}OCl_{6}
2 R_{3}PO + Si_{3}Cl_{8} → 2 R_{3}P + Si_{3}O_{2}Cl_{8}

Boranes and alanes also deoxygenate phosphine oxides. Phosphoric acid diesters ((RO)_{2}PO_{2}H) catalyze deoxygenation with hydrosilanes.

== Use ==
Phosphine oxides are ligands in various types of homogeneous catalysis.

In coordination chemistry, they are known to have labilizing effects to CO ligands cis to it in organometallic reactions. The cis effect describes this process.

Phosphine oxides are excellent hydrogen-bond acceptors.

The ^{31}P NMR shift of triethylphosphine oxide when bound to a Lewis acid, is commonly used to determine the effective Lewis acidity.
