= Oilfield scale inhibition =

Process in petroleum processing

Oilfield scale inhibition is the process of preventing the formation of scale from blocking or hindering fluid flow through pipelines, valves, and pumps used in oil production and processing. Scale inhibitors (SIs) are a class of specialty chemicals that are used to slow or prevent scaling in water systems. Oilfield scaling is the precipitation and accumulation of insoluble crystals (salts) from a mixture of incompatible aqueous phases in oil processing systems. Scale is a common term in the oil industry used to describe solid deposits that grow over time, blocking and hindering fluid flow through pipelines, valves, pumps etc. with significant reduction in production rates and equipment damages. Scaling represents a major challenge for flow assurance in the oil and gas industry. Examples of oilfield scales are calcium carbonate (limescale), iron sulfides, barium sulfate and strontium sulfate. Scale inhibition encompasses the processes or techniques employed to treat scaling problems.

== Background ==
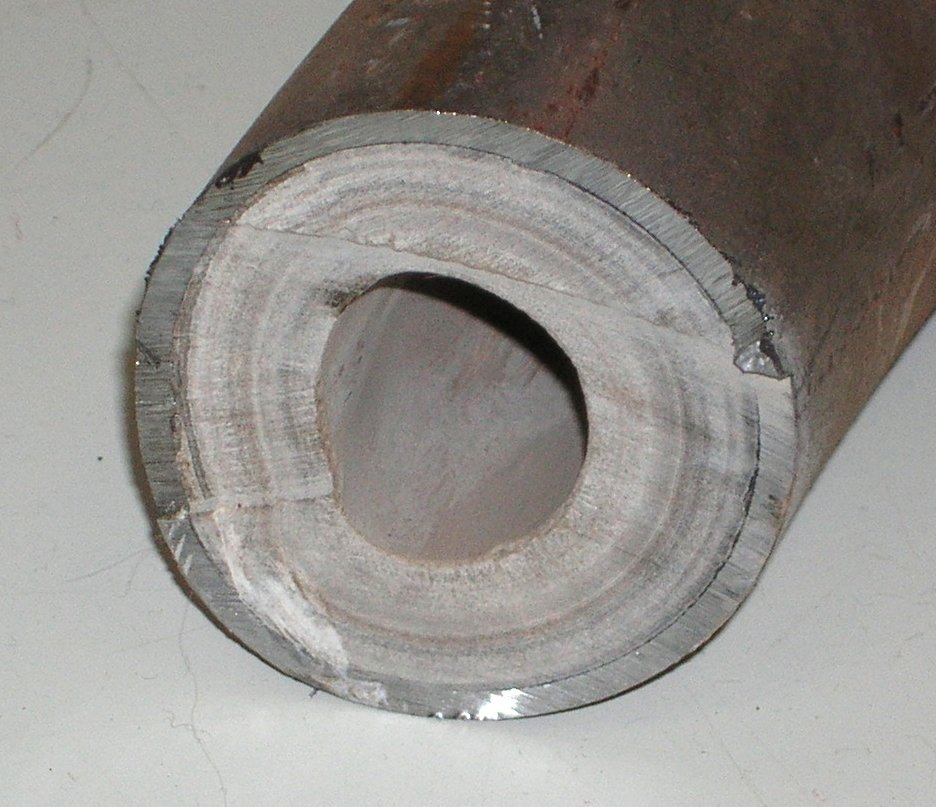
Scale build-up effectively decreases pipeline diameter and reduces flow rate

The three prevailing water-related problems that upset oil companies today are corrosion, gas hydrates and scaling in production systems. The reservoir water has a high composition of dissolved minerals equilibrated over millions of years at constant physicochemical conditions. As the reservoir fluids are pumped from the ground, changes in temperature, pressure and chemical composition shift the equilibria and cause precipitation and deposition of sparingly soluble salts that build up over time with the potential of blocking vital assets in the oil production setups. Scaling can occur at all stages of oil/gas production systems (upstream, midstream and downstream) and causes blockages of well-bore perforations, casing, pipelines, pumps, valves etc. Severe scaling issues have been reported in Russia and certain North Sea production systems.

== Types of scales ==
Two main classifications of scales are known; inorganic and organic scales and the two types are mutually inclusive, occurring simultaneously in the same system, referred to as mixed scale. Mixed scales may result in highly complex structured scales that are difficult to treat. Such scales require aggressive, severe and sometimes costly remediation techniques. Paraffin wax, asphaltenes and gas hydrates are the most often encountered organic scales in the oil industry. This article focuses on the simplest and common form of scales encountered; inorganic scales.

=== Inorganic scale ===
Inorganic scales refer to mineral deposits that occur when the formation water mixes with different brines such as injection water. The mixing changes causes reaction between incompatible ions and changes the thermodynamic and equilibrium state of the reservoir fluids. Supersaturation and subsequent deposition of the inorganic salts occur. The most common types of inorganic scales known to the oil/gas industry are carbonates and sulfates; sulfides and chlorites are often encountered.

While the solubility of most inorganic salts (NaCl, KCl, ...) increases with temperature (endothermic dissolution reaction), some inorganic salts such as calcium carbonate and calcium sulfate have also a retrograde solubility, i.e., their solubility decreases with temperature. In the case of calcium carbonate, it is due to the degassing of CO_{2} whose solubility decreases with temperature as is the case for most of the gases (exothermic dissolution reaction in water). In calcium sulfate, the reason is that the dissolution reaction of calcium sulfate itself is exothermic and therefore is favored when the temperature decreases (then, the dissolution heat is more easily evacuated; see Le Chatelier's principle). In other terms, the solubility of calcium carbonate and calcium sulfate increases at low temperature and decreases at high temperature, as it is also the case for calcium hydroxide (portlandite), often cited as a didactic case study to explain the reason of retrograde solubility.

Name	Chemical Formula	Mineral
Calcium carbonate	CaCO_{3}	Calcite, aragonite
Calcium sulfate	CaSO_{4}	Anhydrite, gypsum (CaSO_{4} · 2 H_{2}O), bassanite (hemihydrate form) (CaSO_{4} · 0.5 H_{2}O)
Calcium oxalate	CaC_{2}O_{4}	Beerstone
Barium sulfate	BaSO_{4}	Barite
Magnesium hydroxide	Mg(OH)_{2}	Brucite
Magnesium oxide	MgO	Periclase
Silicates	Me(Si_{n}O_{x}) · y H_{2}O	Serpentine, acmite, gyrolite, gehlenite, amorphous silica, quartz, cristobalite, pectolite
Aluminium oxy-hydroxides	AlO(OH)	Boehmite, gibbsite, diaspore, corundum
Aluminosilicates	Al_{x}Si_{y}O_{z}	Analcite, cancrinite, noselite
Copper	Cu	Metallic copper, cuprite (Cu_{2}O), tenorite (Cu )
Magnetite	Fe_{3}O_{4}	Fe^{2+} and Fe^{3+} mixed oxide: FeO + Fe_{2}O_{3}
Nickel ferrite	NiFe_{2}O_{4}	Trevorite, Ni^{2+} and Fe^{3+} mixed oxide: NiO + Fe_{2}O_{3}
Phosphates	Ca_{10}(PO_{4})_{6}(OH)_{2}	Hydroxyapatite

=== Calcium carbonate scale ===
Water, noted for its high solvation power can dissolve certain gases such as carbon dioxide (CO_{2}) to form aqueous CO_{2(aq)}. Under the right conditions of temperature and/or pressure, H_{2}O and CO_{2(aq)} molecules react to yield carbonic acid (H_{2}CO_{3}) whose solubility increases at low temperature and high pressure. The slightest changes in pressure and temperature dissolves H_{2}CO_{3(aq)} in water according to equation (3) to form hydronium and bicarbonate (HCO_{3}^{−}_{(aq)}) ions.

1. CO_{2(aq)} + H_{2}O_{(l)} ↔ H_{2}CO_{3(aq)}
2. H_{2}CO_{3(aq)} ↔ H^{+}_{(aq)} + HCO_{3}^{−}_{(aq)}
3. 2 HCO_{3}^{−}_{(aq)} ↔ CO_{3}^{2−}_{(aq)} + H_{2}O_{(l)} + CO_{2(g)}
4. Ca^{2+}_{(aq)} + CO_{3}^{2−}_{(aq)} ↔ CaCO_{3(s)}

The two reactions (2) and (4) describe the equilibrium between bicarbonate ions (HCO_{3}^{−}), which are highly soluble in water and calcium carbonate (CaCO_{3}) salt. According to Le Chatelier's principle, drilling operations and extraction of the oil from the well bore decreases the pressure of the formation and the equilibrium shifts to the right (3) to increase the production of CO_{2} to offset the change in pressure. After years of oil production, wells may experience significant pressure drops resulting in large CaCO_{3} deposits as the equilibrium shifts to offset the pressure changes.

=== Sulfate scales ===
Sulfates of Group (II) metal ions (M^{2+}), generally decrease in solubility down the group. The most difficult scales to remove are those of Barium sulfate because of its high insolubility forming very hard scale deposits. A general representation of the reaction is summarized in reaction:

5. M^{2+}_{(aq)} + SO_{4}^{2−}_{(aq)} → MSO_{4(s)}

Sulfate scale usually forms when formation water and injected seawater mix together. The relationship between these and the degree of supersaturation is crucial in estimating the amount of sulfate salts that will precipitate in the system. Seawater has a high concentration of sulfate ions and mixing with formation water with many Ca^{2+} and other M^{2+} ions in the formation water. Severe problems with sulfate scale are common in reservoirs where seawater has been injected to enhance oil recovery.

Due to its relatively high solubility in water, Calcium sulfate is the easiest sulfate scale to remove chemically as compared to strontium and barium sulfate. Scale crystals are initially dispersed in production systems until accumulation of stable crystals of insoluble sulfates and scale growth occur at nucleation centers. Uneven pipeline surfaces and production equipment such as pumps and valves cause rapid scale growth to levels that can block pipelines.

The scaling-tendency of an oil-well can be predicted based on the prevailing conditions such as pH, temperature, pressure, ionic strength and the mole fraction of CO_{2} in the vapor and aqueous phases. For instance the saturation index for CaCO_{3} scale is calculated using the formula;

F_{s}= {[Ca^{2+}][CO_{3}^{2−}]}/K_{sp}

Where F_{s} is the scale saturation ratio, defined as the ratio of the activity product to the solubility product of the salt. Activity is defined as the product of the activity coefficients and the concentrations of Ca^{2+} and SO_{4}^{2−} ions. The ionic strength is a measure of the concentration of the dissociated ions dissolved in water also called as “total dissolved solids” (TDS).

== Scale remediation ==
Different oilfield scale remediation techniques are known but majority are based on three basic themes:

1. Sulfate ion sequestering from sea injection waters
2. Chemical or mechanical Scale removal/dissolution
3. Application of Scale Inhibitors (SIs) for scale prevention

The first two methods may be used for short-term treatment and effective for mild-scaling conditions, however, continuous injection or chemical scale squeeze treatment with SIs have been proven over the years to be the most efficient and cost-effective preventative technique.

=== Scale inhibitors ===
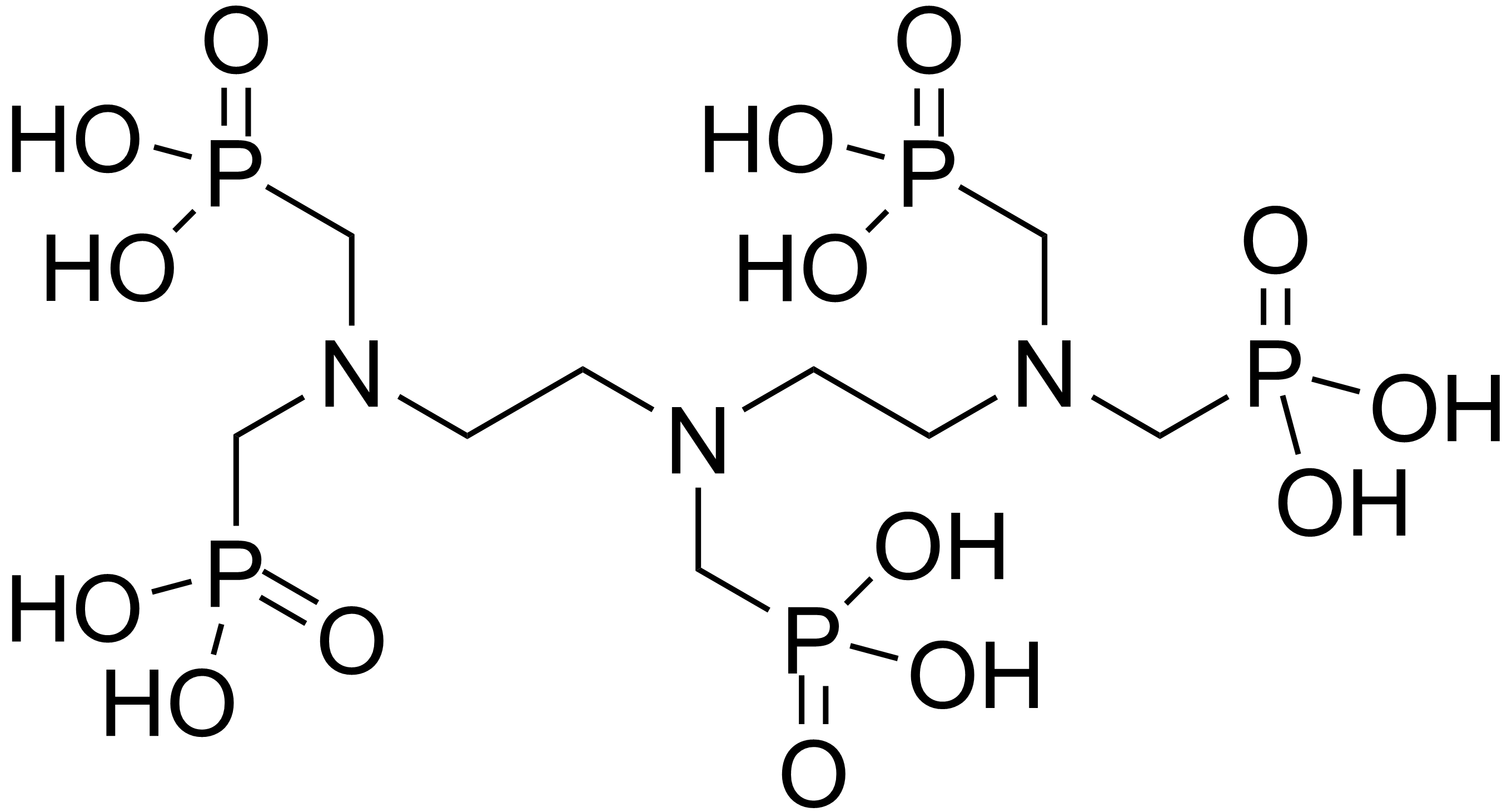
Chemical Structure of Diethylenetriaminepenta(methylene-phosphonic acid)

Scale inhibitors are specialty chemicals that are added to oil production systems to delay, reduce and/or prevent scale deposition. acrylic acid polymers, maleic acid polymers and phosphonates have been used extensively for scale treatment in water systems due to their excellent solubility, thermal stability and dosage efficiency. In the water treatment industry, the major classes of SIs have inorganic phosphate, organophosphorous and organic polymer backbones and common examples are PBTC (phosphonobutane-1,2,4-tricarboxylic acid), ATMP (amino-trimethylene phosphonic acid) and HEDP (1-hydroxyethylidene-1,1-diphosphonic acid), polyacrylic acid (PAA), phosphinopolyacrylates (such as PPCA), polymaleic acids (PMA), maleic acid terpolymers (MAT), sulfonic acid copolymers, such as SPOCA (sulfonated phosphonocarboxylic acid), polyvinyl sulfonates. Two common oilfield mineral SIs are Poly-Phosphono Carboxylic acid (PPCA) and Diethylenetriamine- penta (methylene phosphonic acid) (DTPMP).

Inhibition of calcium carbonate scale deposition and crystal studies of its polymorphs have been conducted. Different SIs are designed for specific scaling conditions and biodegradability properties. The inhibitor molecules essentially bind ions in aqueous phase of production fluids that could potentially precipitate as scales. For instance, to bind positively charged ions in the water, anions must be present in the inhibitor molecular backbone structure and vice versa. Group (II) metal ions are commonly sequestered by SIs with the following functionalities;

- Phosphonate ions (-PO_{3}H^{−})

- Phosphate ions (-OPO_{3}H^{−})

- Phosphonate ions (-PO_{2}H^{−})

- Sulphonate ions (-SO_{3}^{−})

- Carboxylate ions (-CO_{2}^{−})

A SI with a combination of two or more of these functional groups is more efficient in managing scale problems. Usually the sodium salts of the carboxylic derivatives are synthesized as the anionic derivatives and are known to be the most effective due to their high solubilities. Interactions of these functional groups tend to prevent the crystal growth sites using dissociated or un-dissociated groups. The dissociation state is determined by the pH of the system, hence knowledge of the pKa values of the chemicals are important for different pH environments. Again, the inhibition efficiency of the SI depends on its compatibility with other production chemicals such as corrosion inhibitors.

== Environmental considerations ==
Generally, the environmental impacts of SIs are complicated further by combination of other chemicals applied through exploratory, drilling, well-completion and start-up operations. Produced fluids, and other wastes from oil and gas operations with high content of different toxic compounds are hazardous and harmful to human health, water supplies, marine and freshwater organisms. For instance trails of increased turbidity resulting from oil and gas exploratory activities on the eastern shelf of Sakhalin in Russia have been reported with consequential adverse effects on salmon, cod and littoral amphipods.

Efforts to develop more environmentally friendly SIs have been made since the late 1990s and an increasing number of such SIs are becoming commercially available. Recent environmental awareness over the past 15 years has resulted in the production and application of more environmentally friendly SIs, otherwise called 'Green Scale Inhibitors' (GSI). These GSIs are designed to have reduced bio-accumulating and high biodegradability properties and therefore reduce pollution of the waters around oil production systems. Phosphate ester SIs, commonly employed for treating calcium carbonate scales are known to be environmentally friendly but poor inhibition efficiency. Release of SIs containing Nitrogen and Phosphorus distorts the natural equilibrium of the immediate water body with adverse effects on aquatic life.

Another alternative, polysaccharide SIs meet the requirements for environmentally friendly materials; they contain no Phosphorus or Nitrogen and are noted for their non-toxic, renewable, and biodegradable properties. Carboxymethyl inulin (CMI), which is isolated from the roots of Inula helenium has been used in oil exploration and its very low toxicity and crystal growth inhibition power has been reported for treating calcite scales. Examples of poorly biodegradable SIs such as the amino-phosphonate and acrylate-based SIs are being phased-out by stringent environmental regulations as demonstrated in the North sea by Norway zero discharge policy.

Another modern alternative to SI use for environmental protection is the development of materials or coatings that intrinsically resist formation of inorganic scale to begin with. A variety of strategies can be used to accomplish this aim, including engineering of wettability properties and engineering of epitaxial properties to prevent mineral growth or to make minerals easier to remove following growth. Recent work has demonstrated that some classes of hydrophobic and superhydrophobic surfaces can cause self-ejection of scale grown during evaporation
