= Aminophosphonate =

Class of organophosphorus compounds

Aminophosphonates are organophosphorus compounds with the formula (RO)_{2}P(O)CH_{2}NR_{2}. These compounds are structural analogues of amino acids in which a carboxylic moiety is replaced by phosphonic acid or related groups. Acting as antagonists of amino acids, they inhibit enzymes involved in amino acid metabolism and thus affect the physiological activity of the cell. These effects may be exerted as antibacterial, plant growth regulatory or neuromodulatory. They can act as ligands, and heavy metal complexes with aminophosphonates have medical applications.

Phosphonates are more difficult to hydrolyse than phosphates. Some aminophosphonates degrade to aminomethylphosphonic acid.

== Preparation ==
Aminophosphonates are often prepared by hydrophosphonylation, usually the condensation of imines and phosphorous acid. In the Pudovik reaction or Kabachnik–Fields reaction, the esters of phosphorous acid are employed, e.g. diphenylphosphite. Because these compounds are of pharmaceutical interest, methods have been developed to induce these additions asymmetrically.

== Examples ==
Aminomethylphosphonic acid (AMPA), the simplest possible aminophosphonate.

Glyphosate, a common though contentious herbicide

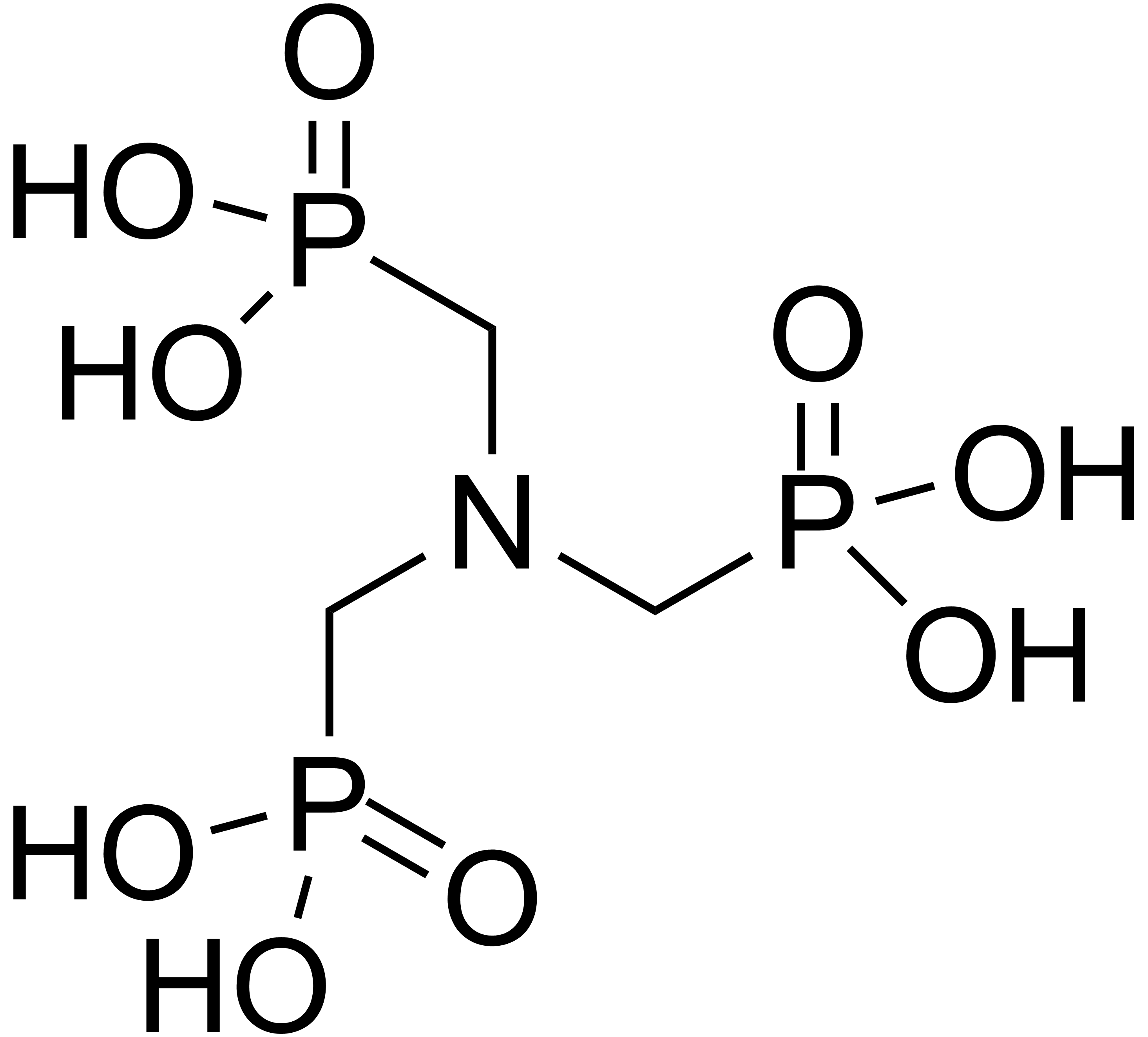
ATMP is used in water treatment as antiscalant

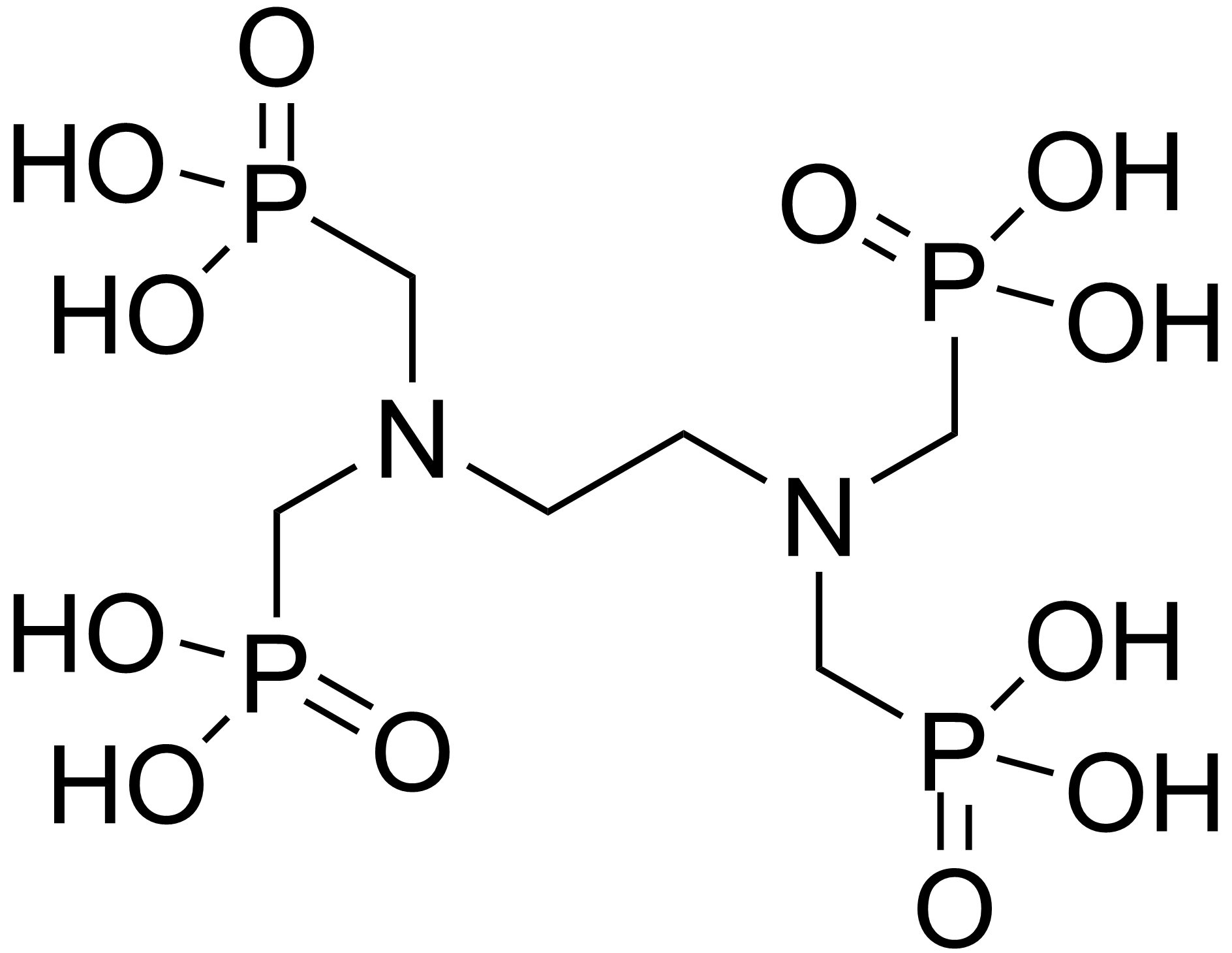
EDTMP, a chelating agent. Its ^{153}Sm complex (Quadramet) is used in the treatment of cancer

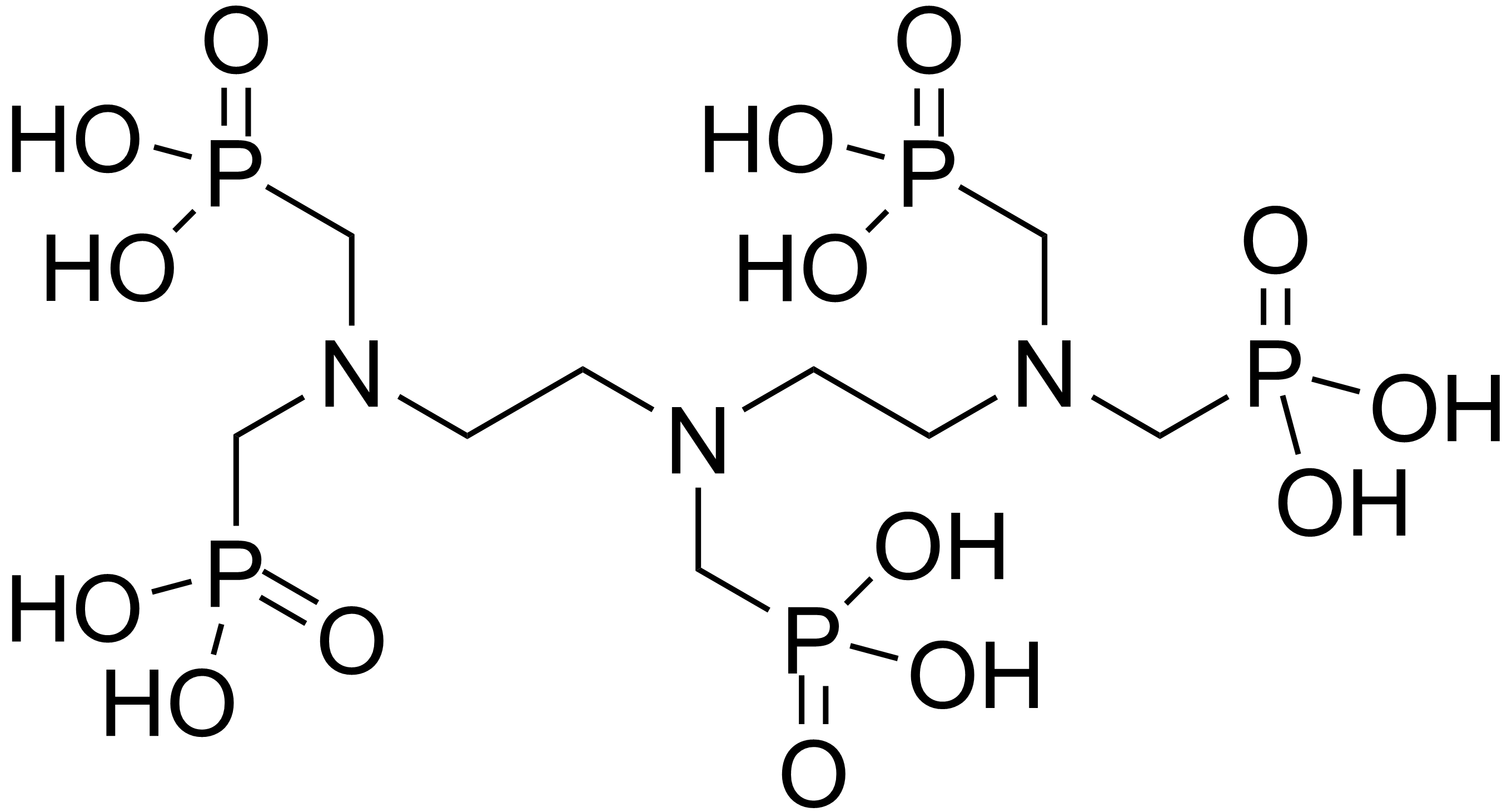
DTPMP
