= AMPA (disambiguation) =

AMPA is a chemical compound that mimics the effects of glutamate in the central nervous system.

AMPA may also refer to:

- American Military Partner Association, a U.S. LGBT advocacy and support group
- Aminomethylphosphonic acid, a degradation product of the herbicide glyphosate
- Asociación de Madres y Padres de Alumnos, Spanish association similar to Parent-Teacher Association
