= Phosphonate dehydrogenase =

phosphonate dehydrogenase

Identifiers
- EC no.: 1.20.1.1

Databases
- IntEnz: IntEnz view
- BRENDA: BRENDA entry
- ExPASy: NiceZyme view
- KEGG: KEGG entry
- MetaCyc: metabolic pathway
- PRIAM: profile
- PDB structures: RCSB PDB PDBe PDBsum
- Gene Ontology: AmiGO / QuickGO
Search
- PMC: articles
- PubMed: articles
- NCBI: proteins

In enzymology, a phosphonate dehydrogenase (EC 1.20.1.1) is an enzyme that catalyzes the chemical reaction

phosphonate + NAD^{+} + H_{2}O $\rightleftharpoons$ phosphate + NADH + H^{+}

The 3 substrates of this enzyme are phosphonate, NAD^{+}, and H_{2}O, whereas its 3 products are phosphate, NADH, and H^{+}.

This enzyme belongs to the family of oxidoreductases, specifically those acting on phosphorus or arsenic in donor with NAD+ or NADP+ as acceptor. The systematic name of this enzyme class is phosphonate:NAD+ oxidoreductase. Other names in common use include NAD:phosphite oxidoreductase, and phosphite dehydrogenase.
