= Phosphinous acid =

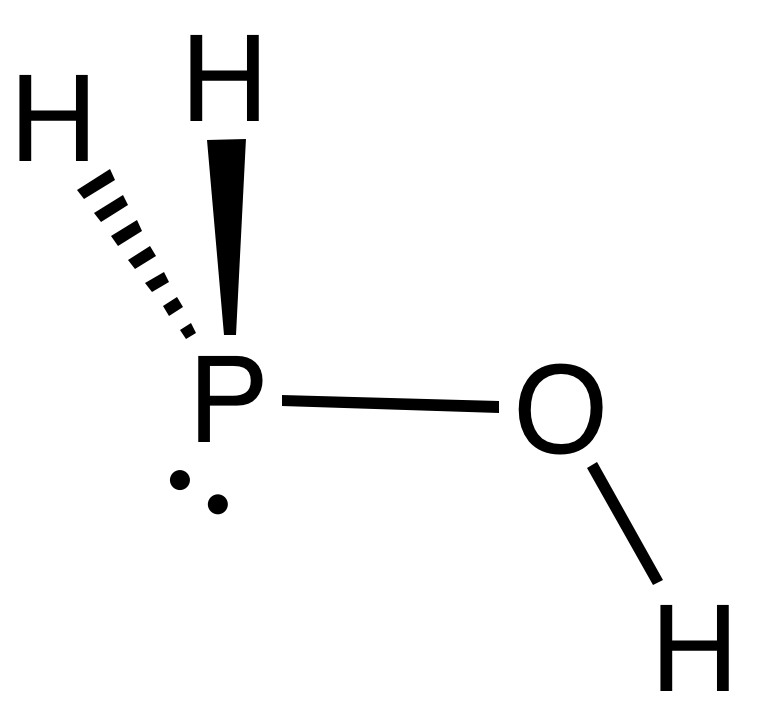

Names
- Other names hydroxyphosphine

Identifiers
| CAS Number | 25756-87-0 |
| 3D model (JSmol) | Interactive image |
| ChemSpider | 126521 |
| PubChem CID | 143409 |
| CompTox Dashboard (EPA) | DTXSID80276387 |
- InChI: InChI=1S/H3OP/c1-2/h1H,2H2 Key: RYIOLWQRQXDECZ-UHFFFAOYSA-N
- SMILES: OP

Properties
| Chemical formula | H_{3}OP |
| Molar mass | 49.997 g·mol^{−1} |

Related compounds
| Related compounds | Hydroxylamine |
- Except where otherwise noted, data are given for materials in their standard state (at 25 °C [77 °F], 100 kPa). Infobox references

Phosphinous acid is the inorganic compound with the formula H_{2}POH. It exists, fleetingly, as a mixture with its less stable tautomer H_{3}PO (phosphine oxide). This mixture has been generated by low temperature oxidation of phosphine with ozone. H_{2}POH is mainly of pedagogical interest. Organophosphinous acids are more prevalent than the parent H_{2}POH.

== Organophosphinous acids ==
Phosphinous acids exist mainly as minor tautomers of secondary phosphine oxides. For example diphenylphosphinous acid, which is not detectable directly, is invoked as the tautomer of diphenylphosphine oxide.

Highly electron-withdrawing substituents stabilize the phosphinous acid tautomer as illustrated by (CF_{3})_{2}POH.
