= C6H15O3P =

The molecular formula C_{6}H_{15}O_{3}P (molar mass: 166.157 g/mol, exact mass: 166.0759 u) may refer to:

- Diisopropylphosphite
- Triethyl phosphite
