= Kabachnik =

Kabachnik is a Russian occupational surname literally meaning "innkeeper" (kabak keeper). Notable people with the surname include:

- Martin Kabachnik (1908–1997), Soviet organic chemist, namesake of the Kabachnik–Fields reaction
- Nikolai Kabachnik (born 1940), Soviet and Russian nuclear physicist, professor
