= Transition metal complexes of phosphine oxides =

Class of chemical compounds

Transition metal complexes of phosphine oxides are coordination complex containing one or more phosphine oxide ligands. Many phosphine oxides exist and most behave as hard Lewis bases. Tertiary phosphine oxides bind metals by formation of M-O bonds.

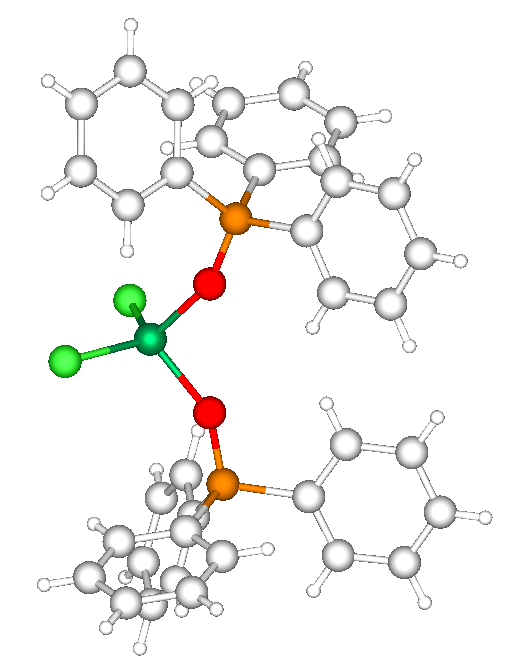
Structure of NiCl_{2}[OP(C_{6}H_{5})_{3}]_{2}. Selected bond lengths: 1.96 (Ni-O) and 1.51 Å (P-O). The Ni-O-P angles are 151°. Color code: red = O, orange = P, green = Cl, Ni.

== Structure ==
Principal resonance structures for phosphine oxides.

The structure of a tertiary phosphine oxide is not strongly perturbed by coordination. The geometry at phosphorus remains tetrahedral. The P-O distance elongates by ca. 2%. In triphenylphosphine oxide, the P-O distance is 1.48 Å. In NiCl_{2}[OP(C_{6}H_{5})_{3}]_{2}, the distance is 1.51 Å (see figure). A similar elongation of the P-O bond is seen in cis-WCl_{4}(OPPh_{3})_{2}. The trend is consistent with the stabilization of the ionic resonance structure upon complexation.

== Examples ==
Typically, complexes are derived from hard metal centers. Examples include cis-WCl_{4}(OPPh_{3})_{2} and NbOCl_{3}(OPPh_{3})_{2} Trialkylphosphine oxides are more basic (better ligands) than triarylphosphine oxides. One such complex is FeCl_{2}(OPMe_{3})_{2} (Me = CH_{3}).

== Synthesis and reactions ==
Most complexes of phosphine oxides are prepared by treatment of a labile metal complex with preformed phosphine oxide. In some cases, the phosphine oxide is unintentionally generated by air-oxidation of the parent phosphine ligand.

Since phosphine oxides are weak Lewis bases, they are readily displaced from their metal complexes. This behavior has led to investigation of mixed phosphine-phosphine oxide ligands, which exhibit hemilability. Typical phosphine-phosphine oxide ligands are Ph_{2}P(CH_{2})_{n}P(O)Ph_{2} (Ph = C_{6}H_{5}) derived from bis(diphenylphosphino)ethane (n = 2) and bis(diphenylphosphino)methane (n = 1).

In one case, coordination of the oxide of dppe to W(0) results in deoxygenation, giving an oxotungsten complex of dppe.

== Secondary phosphine oxides as ligands ==
structure of "platinum pop"

Secondary phosphine oxides have the formula R_{2}P(O)H. They tautomerize to small amounts of the hydroxy tautomer R_{2}P-OH. Regardless, the hydroxy tautomer forms a wide variety of complexes with transition metals. In contrast to O-bonded phosphine oxide ligands, the P-bonded phosphine oxides are strong field ligands. Complexes of secondary phosphine oxide often engage in intramolecular hydrogen bonds. Illustrative is the complex derived from dimethylphosphine oxide, PtH(PMe_{2}OH)_{2}(PMe_{2}O) (Me = CH_{3}). Itramolecular hydrogen bonding also features prominently in some complexes of phosphorous acid. The complex platinum pop, formally derived from P(OH)_{3}, is one example.

The Kläui ligand is the anion {(C_{5}H_{5})Co[(CH_{3}O)_{2}PO]_{3}}^{−}, which is derived by demethylation of a trimethylphosphite complex. In this case the "ligand" is a complex of cobalt that also binds to other metals in a tridentate manner.

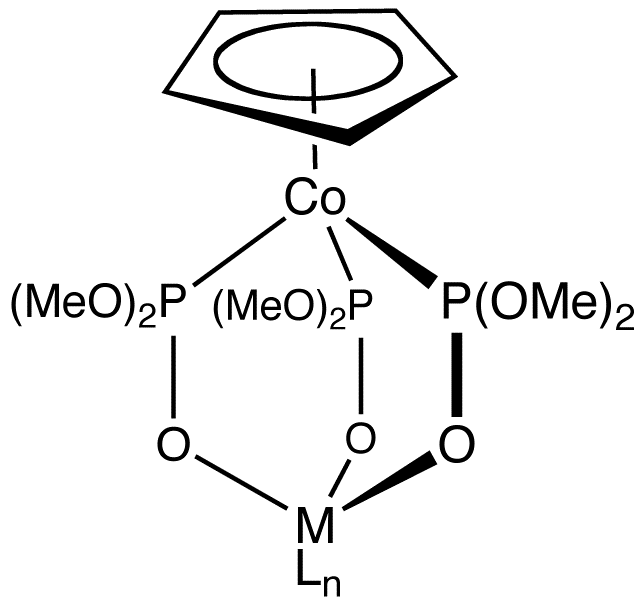
General structure of a metal center (ML_{n}) coordinated to a κ^{3}-Kläui ligand.
