= ATMP (disambiguation) =

ATMP is a chemical compound used as a chelator.

ATMP may also refer to:

- Advances in Theoretical and Mathematical Physics, a peer-reviewed mathematics journal
- All Terrain Mobility Platform
- All Things Must Pass, an album by George Harrison, which both refer to the song or the album.
- Advanced Therapy Medicinal Product, a classification for medicinal products that are based on genes, cells or tissues
