= Antiscalant =

Industrial water treatment chemical

An antiscalant is a chemical or pre-treatment chemical that prevents the formation of scale, or crystallized mineral salts, commonly used in water purification systems, pipelines, and cooling tower applications. Antiscalants are also known as scale inhibitor agents. Scale formation occurs when the concentration of dissolved salts in water exceeds their solubility limits, leading to the precipitation of these salts onto surfaces as hard deposits. Antiscalants dissolve the substances accumulated near the membrane surface and reduce the rate of fouling. They play a crucial role in preventing scale formation, thus improving the efficiency and longevity of industrial equipment and processes.

== Common ingredients ==
Antiscalants could be broadly classified into 3 main categories: phosphorus based AS, synthetic polymeric AS and natural green AS. Common active ingredients include phosphonates, polyphosphates, polymers, aminophosphonates and organic acids. Antiscalants typically contain a combination of active ingredients that interfere with the crystallization process of scale-forming salts. Phosphorus-based antiscalants have the largest application use globally, and they can be further classified into phosphorus-based and phosphonate-based AS. Green antiscalants usually contain natural polymers such as starch and are recently being more widely investigated due to discharge requirements. Polymer-based AS are synthetic polymers that have functional groups like carboxylic acid groups, acrylic acid, sulfonic acid, and phosphonic acid groups. Common global suppliers of antiscalants include Kurita Water Industries, Avista, Nalco, and Veolia.

== Chemistry and mechanism ==
These compounds work by various mechanisms such as suppression of crystallization, dispersion, and crystal distortion.

=== Suppression of crystallization ===
Antiscalants contain molecules that can complex with metal ions present in the water, preventing them from participating in scale formation reactions. Phosphonates and polyphosphates are particularly effective in sequestering calcium, magnesium, and other metal ions.

=== Dispersion ===
Antiscalants may also work by dispersing small-scale particles, preventing them from agglomerating and forming larger, more problematic deposits. Polymers are often used for their dispersing properties.

=== Crystal modification ===
Some antiscalants alter the crystal structure of scale-forming salts, making them less likely to adhere to surfaces and form stubborn deposits. At a submicroscopic level, these soft non-adherent scales with antiscalant use would appear distorted, more oval in shape, and less compact.

== Applications ==
=== Reverse osmosis and desalination ===
In reverse osmosis (RO) and desalination plants, antiscalants are vital for preventing scale formation on membrane surfaces. Scaling can severely impair the efficiency of these processes and lead to increased maintenance costs. Antiscalants help maintain optimal performance and prolong the lifespan of membranes. Scales form in the RO or desalination plants when the ionic product of sparingly dissolved salts in the concentrated flow equals or exceeds their solubility product. The extent and degree of scaling phenomena are determined not only by the supersaturation conditions that occurred, but also by the precipitation kinetics.

=== Water treatment ===
Scale deposition in boilers can reduce heat transfer efficiency and increase energy consumption. Antiscalants are added to boiler feedwater to prevent scale formation on heat transfer surfaces, piping, and other boiler components. Water treatment plants can use antiscalants to maintain filtration.

=== Cooling water systems ===
Industrial cooling water systems are susceptible to scale formation due to high temperatures and concentrations of dissolved minerals. Antiscalants help mitigate scale deposition in cooling towers, heat exchangers, and condensers, preserving their efficiency and reducing the need for maintenance.

=== Mining and oil, and gas industry ===
Antiscalants are used in mining operations and oil & gas production to prevent scale deposition in pipelines, drilling equipment, and processing facilities. Scaling in these industries can lead to decreased flow rates, equipment damage, and production downtime. Preventing the formation of scale from blocking or hindering fluid flow through pipelines, valves, and pumps used in oil production and processing. Oilfield scaling is the precipitation and accumulation of insoluble crystals (salts) from a mixture of incompatible aqueous phases in oil processing systems.
