= Dimethylphosphine oxide =

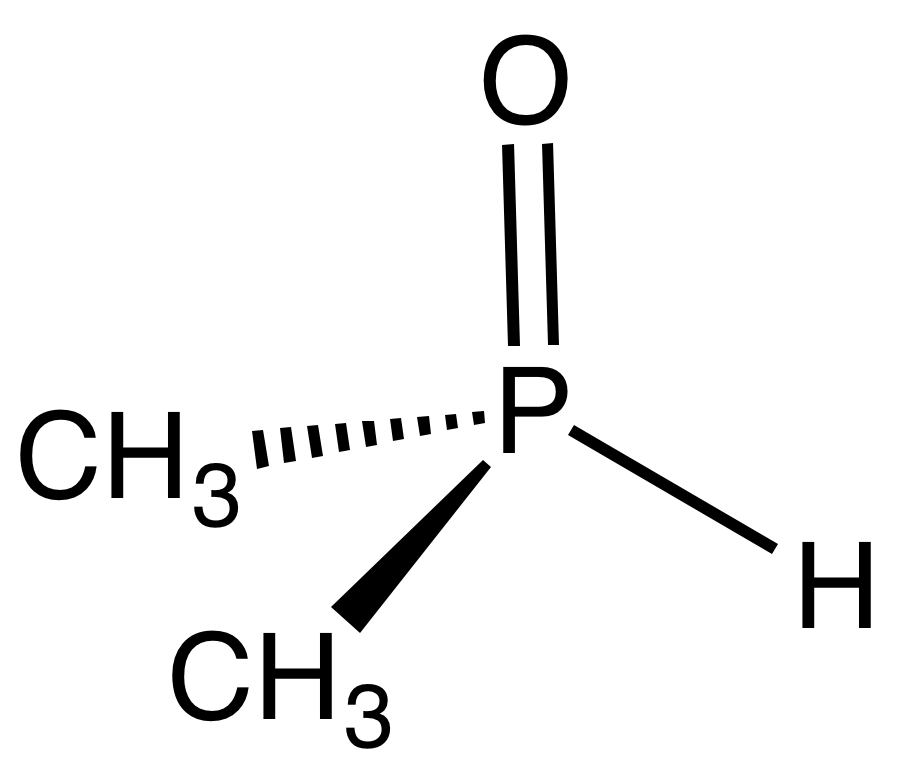

Names
- Preferred IUPAC name Dimethyl-λ^{5}-phosphanone
- Other names dimethylphosphinous acid tautomer

Identifiers
CAS Number	7211-39-4
3D model (JSmol)	Interactive image
ChemSpider	10415346
EC Number	230-591-2
PubChem CID	81631
- InChI: InChI=1S/C2H7OP/c1-4(2)3/h4H,1-2H3 Key: HGDIHUZVQPKSMO-UHFFFAOYSA-N
- SMILES: CP(=O)C

Properties
Chemical formula	C_{2}H_{7}OP
Molar mass	78.051 g·mol^{−1}
Appearance	colorless liquid
Boiling point	65–67 °C

Hazards
- GHS labelling
Pictograms	(GHS07: Exclamation mark)
Signal word	Warning
Hazard statements	H302, H315, H319, H335
Precautionary statements	P261, P264, P270, P271, P280, P301+P312, P302+P352, P304+P340, P305+P351+P338, P312, P321, P330, P332+P313, P337+P313, P362, P403+P233, P405, P501
- Except where otherwise noted, data are given for materials in their standard state (at 25 °C [77 °F], 100 kPa). Infobox references

Dimethylphosphine oxide is an organophosphorus compound with the formula (CH_{3})_{2}P(O)H. It is a colorless liquid that soluble in polar organic solvents. It exists as the phosphine oxide, not the hydroxy tautomer. A related compound is diphenylphosphine oxide. Both are sometimes called secondary phosphine oxides.

== Preparation ==
The compound arises by the hydrolysis of chlorodimethylphosphine:

Me_{2}PCl + H_{2}O → Me_{2}P(O)H + HCl

Methanol, but not ethanol, can also be used in place of water, the co-product being methyl chloride.

Since chlorodimethylphosphine is dangerous to handle, alternative routes to dimethylphosphine oxide have been developed. A popular method starts with diethylphosphite, according to the following idealized equations:

(C_{2}H_{5}O)_{2}P(O)H + 3 CH_{3}MgBr → (CH_{3})_{2}P(O)MgBr + 2 MgBr(OC_{2}H_{5}) + CH_{4}
(CH_{3})_{2}P(O)MgBr + H_{2}O → (CH_{3})_{2}P(O)H + 2 MgBr(OH)

== Reactions ==
Chlorination gives dimethylphosphoryl chloride. It undergoes hydroxymethylation with formaldehyde.

Me_{2}P(O)H + CH_{2}O → Me_{2}P(O)CH_{2}OH

Many aldehydes effect a similar reaction.
