= Phosphinous acids =

Phosphinous acids are usually organophosphorus compounds with the formula R_{2}POH. They are pyramidal in structure. Phosphorus is in the oxidation state III. Most phosphinous acids rapidly convert to the corresponding phosphine oxide, which is tetrahedral and is assigned oxidation state V.

== Synthesis ==
Only one example is known, bis(trifluoromethyl)phosphinous acid, (CF_{3})_{2}POH. It is prepared in several steps from phosphorus trichloride (Et = ethyl):

PCl_{3} + 2 Et_{2}NH → PCl_{2}NEt_{2} + Et_{2}NH_{2}Cl
2 P(NEt_{2})_{3} + PCl_{2}NEt_{2} + 2 CF_{3}Br → P(CF_{3})_{2}NEt_{2} + 2 BrClP(NEt_{2})_{3}
P(CF_{3})_{2}NEt_{2} + H_{2}O → P(CF_{3})_{2}OH + HNEt_{2}

Structure of Mo(CO)_{5}P(OH)_{3}.

== Reactions ==
With the lone exception of the bis(trifluoromethyl) derivative, the dominant reaction of phosphinous acids is tautomerization:

PR_{2}OH → OPR_{2}H

Even the pentafluorophenyl compound P(C_{6}F_{5})_{2}OH is unstable with respect to the phosphine oxide.

Although phosphinous acids are rare, their P-bonded coordination complexes are well established, e.g. Mo(CO)_{5}P(OH)_{3}.

== Secondary and primary phosphine oxides ==
Tertiary phosphine oxides, compounds with the formula R_{3}PO cannot tautomerize. The situation is different for the secondary and primary phosphine oxides, with the respective formulas R_{2}(H)PO and R(H)_{2}PO.

Secondary and primary phosphine oxides

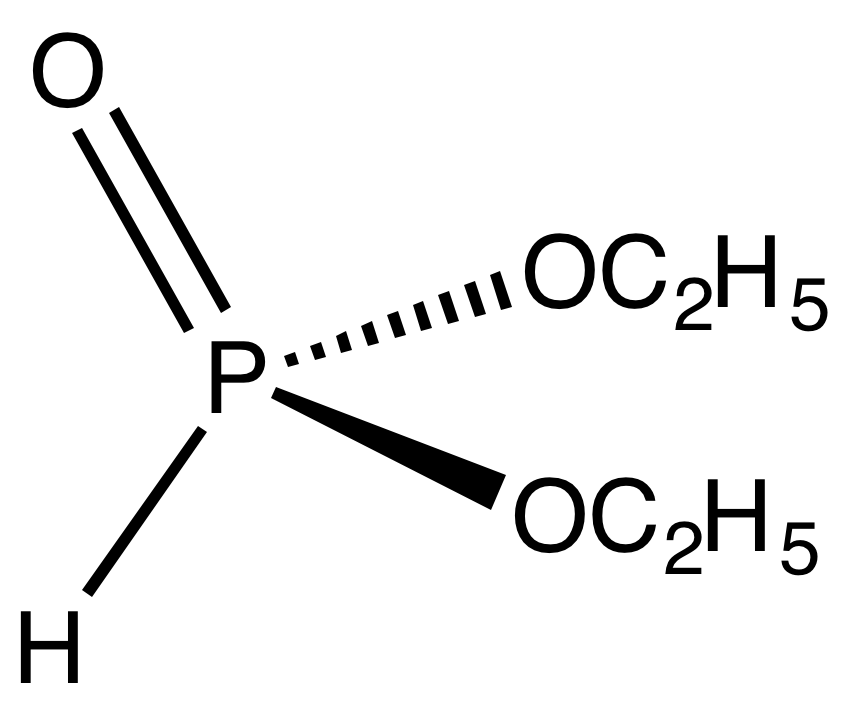
diethylphosphite

phosphorous acid

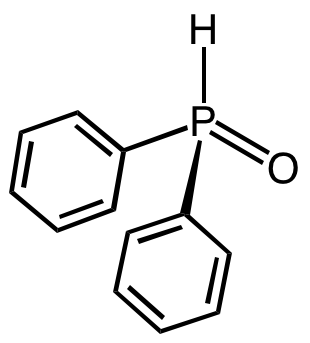
Diphenylphosphine oxide

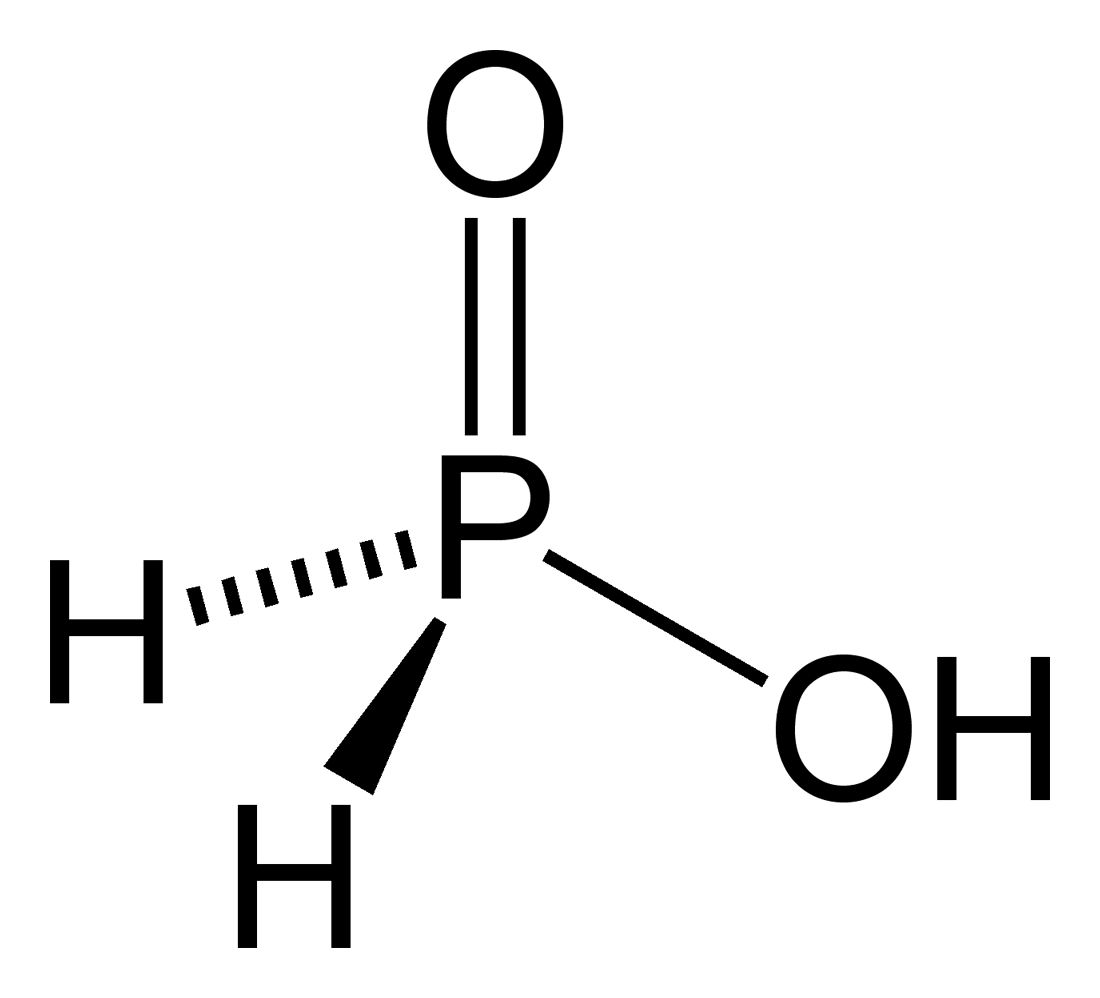
Hypophosphorous acid
