= Abramov reaction =

Conversions of trialkyl to α-hydroxy phosphonates

Named after	Vasilii S. Abramov
Reaction type	Coupling reaction

The Abramov reaction is the related conversions of trialkyl to α-hydroxy phosphonates by the addition to carbonyl compounds. In terms of mechanism, the reaction involves attack of the nucleophilic phosphorus atom on the carbonyl carbon. It was named after the Russian chemist Vasilii Semenovich Abramov (1904–1968) in 1957.

== Introduction ==
Electron-rich sources of phosphorus such as phosphites, phosphonites, and phosphinites may undergo nucleophilic addition to carbon atoms in simple carbonyl compounds. When fully esterified phosphites are used (Abramov reaction), neutralization of the resulting tetrahedral intermediate usually occurs via the transfer of an alkyl or silyl group from an oxygen attached to phosphorus to the newly created alkoxide center. Conjugate addition is also possible, and gives γ-functionalized carbonyl compounds or enol ethers after group transfer. The use of siloxy-containing phosphorus sources has greatly expanded the scope of this reaction, as the resulting α-siloxy compounds can be converted into the corresponding α-hydroxy derivatives in the presence of an alcoholic solvent

(1)

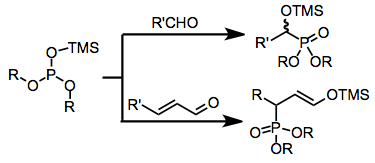

== Mechanism and stereochemistry ==
=== Prevailing mechanism ===
Phosphites add reversibly to the carbonyl carbon of simple carbonyl compounds. Under mild conditions, reversion to the starting materials is faster than both inter- and intramolecular alkyl group transfer—the four-center transition state for intramolecular transfer exhibits poor orbital overlap. Transfer can be facilitated under conditions of high temperature or pressure. If two equivalents of aldehyde are used, addition of the tetrahedral intermediate to a second molecule of aldehyde leads either to cyclic phosphoranes 1 or linear alkyl transfer products 2.

More practical is the use of silylated phosphorus sources, which undergo intramolecular silyl group transfer in a frontside fashion, providing α-siloxy phosphorus compounds 3.

(3)

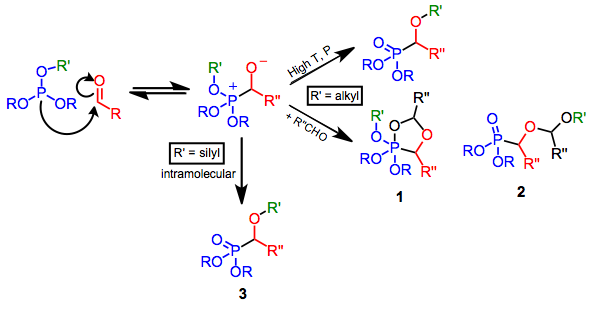

== Scope and limitations ==
=== Phosphorus reagents ===
Phosphites are commonly used to generate α-hydroxy phosphonates. In the presence of two equivalents of aldehyde cyclic phosphoranes 1 (equation 3) predominate, but these can be easily hydrolyzed to give the corresponding hydroxy phosphonates.

(6)

When phosphonous acids are employed in the presence of catalytic amounts of base, phosphine oxides can result. The sodium salts of phosphonous acids have historically worked well in this context, and bases such as sodium amide have been used. However, asymmetric induction and selective direct addition (for conjugated carbonyl compounds) can be achieved in the presence of chiral amine bases.

(7)

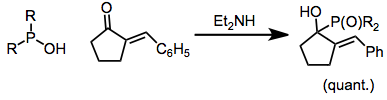

The discovery and use of silylated phosphorus reagents in this reaction represented a methodological advance. Selective silyl group transfer occurs in mixed reagents, and cleavage of the resulting silicon-oxygen bonds can often be accomplished hydrolytically, providing access to α-hydroxy derivatives. Alkylation of α-siloxy products provides a convenient route to otherwise difficult to access α-alkoxy phosphorus compounds. They can function as acyl anion equivalents when deprotonated, and give ketones after elimination under basic conditions.

(8)

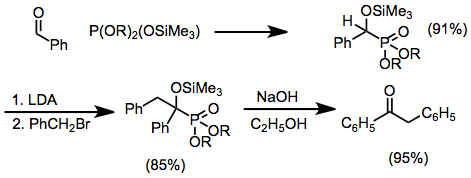

=== Carbonyl substrates ===
Simple ketones and aldehydes readily undergo addition of phosphites at the carbonyl carbon. In one interesting application, addition to ketenes gives products identical to the Arbuzov reaction of acid halides.

(9)

α,β-Unsaturated ketones and aldehydes also undergo the reaction. Dienyl carbonyl substrates can experience 1,6-addition, as in the example below.

(10)

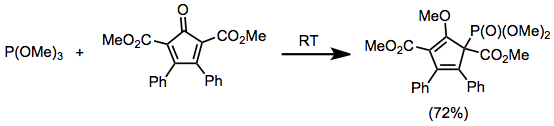

Imines can also undergo the reaction (Pudovik reaction), affording α-alkylamino phosphonates. Primary amines can be produced only after acidic hydrolysis of an intermediate tert-butylamine; the use of unsubstituted imines requires very harsh conditions and gives low yields.

(11)

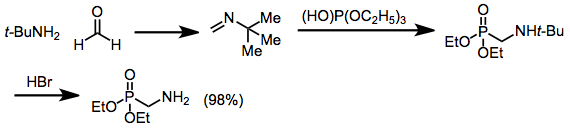

== Synthetic utility ==
The α-hydroxy alkylphosphonates produced by this method can be used for additional transformations. The original carbonyl carbon is acidified by its proximity to the phosphonate group. Deprotonation at this position generates a masked acyl anion, as the phosphonate functionality can be removed after the anion reacts. Phosphonate anions can undergo alkylation and olefination (the Horner-Wadsworth-Emmons reaction). When α-amino alkylphosphonates are employed in olefination, the resulting enamines can be hydrolyzed to ketones.

(12)

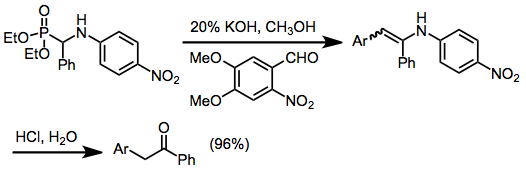

Addition to unsaturated carbonyl compounds and deprotonation affords homoenolate equivalents.

== Comparison with other methods ==
Silylated phosphite reagents are some of the most efficient for the production of α-hydroxyphosphonates. However, a few other methods exist to make these compounds. For instance, the phosphate-phosphonate rearrangement gives α-hydroxyphosphonates via a three-membered cyclic intermediate.

(13)

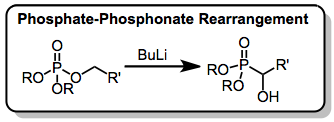

== Experimental conditions and procedures ==
Generally, phosphorus addition reactions are operationally simple. Solutions of reagents in polar (acetonitrile, ethanol, tert-butanol) and non-polar (benzene) solvents may be used. Acid catalysis may be needed for additions of phosphite diesters or for in situ formation of imines. Base catalysis can also be employed in the former case. Distillation is generally sufficient to isolate pure products.

== See also ==
- Michaelis–Arbuzov reaction - the reaction of a trialkyl phosphite and an alkyl halide to form a phosphonate.
