= Dimethyl phosphite =

Names
- Preferred IUPAC name Dimethyl phosphonate
- Other names Phosphonic acid, dimethyl ester

Identifiers
CAS Number	868-85-9
3D model (JSmol)	Interactive image
ChEMBL	ChEMBL65359
ChemSpider	85582
ECHA InfoCard	100.011.622
PubChem CID	94853
UNII	ST4TBO000H
CompTox Dashboard (EPA)	DTXSID5020493
- InChI: InChI=1S/C2H7O3P/c1-4-6(3)5-2/h3H,1-2H3 Key: DLQDGVZAEYZNTG-UHFFFAOYSA-N
- SMILES: COP(O)OC

Properties
Chemical formula	C_{2}H_{7}O_{3}P
Molar mass	110.049 g·mol^{−1}
Appearance	colorless liquid
Density	1.20 g/cm^{3}
Boiling point	170–171 °C (338–340 °F; 443–444 K)
- Except where otherwise noted, data are given for materials in their standard state (at 25 °C [77 °F], 100 kPa). Infobox references

Dimethylphosphite is an organophosphorus compound with the formula (CH_{3}O)_{2}P(O)H, known as dimethyl hydrogen phosphite (DMHP). Dimethylphosphite, is a minor tautomer of the phosphorus(V) derivative. It is a reagent for generating other organophosphorus compounds, exploiting the high reactivity of the P-H bond. The molecule is tetrahedral. It is a colorless liquid. The compounds can be prepared by methanolysis of phosphorus trichloride or by heating diethylphosphite in methanol.

Although studies have not been reported for this compound, the closely related diethylphosphite exists predominantly as the phosphorus(V) tautomer.
