= Vinylphosphonic acid =

Names
- Preferred IUPAC name Ethenylphosphonic acid

Identifiers
CAS Number	1746-03-8
3D model (JSmol)	Interactive image
ChemSpider	147591
ECHA InfoCard	100.015.567
PubChem CID	168725
UNII	FYU8Q3UC9N
CompTox Dashboard (EPA)	DTXSID701011045 DTXSID40862745, DTXSID701011045
- InChI: InChI=1S/C2H5O3P/c1-2-6(3,4)5/h2H,1H2,(H2,3,4,5) Key: ZTWTYVWXUKTLCP-UHFFFAOYSA-N
- SMILES: C=CP(=O)(O)O

Properties
Chemical formula	C_{2}H_{5}O_{3}P
Molar mass	108.033 g·mol^{−1}
Appearance	colourless solid
Density	1.37 g/mL at 20 °C
Melting point	36 °C (97 °F; 309 K)
- Except where otherwise noted, data are given for materials in their standard state (at 25 °C [77 °F], 100 kPa). Infobox references

Vinylphosphonic acid is an organophosphorus compound with the formula C_{2}H_{3}PO_{3}H_{2}. It is a colorless, low-melting solid, although commercial samples are often yellowish viscous liquids. It is used to prepare adhesives. As in other phosphonic acids, the phosphorus center is tetrahedral, being bonded to an organic group (vinyl in this case), two OH groups, and an oxygen.

== Preparation ==
Vinylphosphonic acid can be prepared in several ways, but the most common involves the addition of PCl_{3} to acetaldehyde:

PCl_{3} + CH_{3}CHO → CH_{3}CH(O^{−})PCl_{3}^{+}

This adduct reacts with acetic acid:

CH_{3}CH(O^{−})PCl_{3}^{+} + 2 CH_{3}CO_{2}H → CH_{3}CH(Cl)PO(OH)_{2} + 2 CH_{3}COCl

This chloride undergoes dehydrochlorination to afford the target:

CH_{3}CH(Cl)PO(OH)_{2} → CH_{2}=CHPO(OH)_{2} + HCl

== Applications ==
Polymerization of vinylphosphonic acid gives polyvinylphosphonic acid, which is best known for promoting adhesion between organic and inorganic phases. Such interfaces exist between coatings and the substrates to which they are applied. Both vinylphosphonic acid homopolymer and its copolymers are the basis of many products which have found applications in scale and corrosion treatment. Polyvinylphosphonic acid is an essential component for the polymer electrolyte membranes used in fuel cell development, in the medical field as dental cements, hydrogels for drug delivery, and components in biomimetic mineralization.
