= EDTMP =

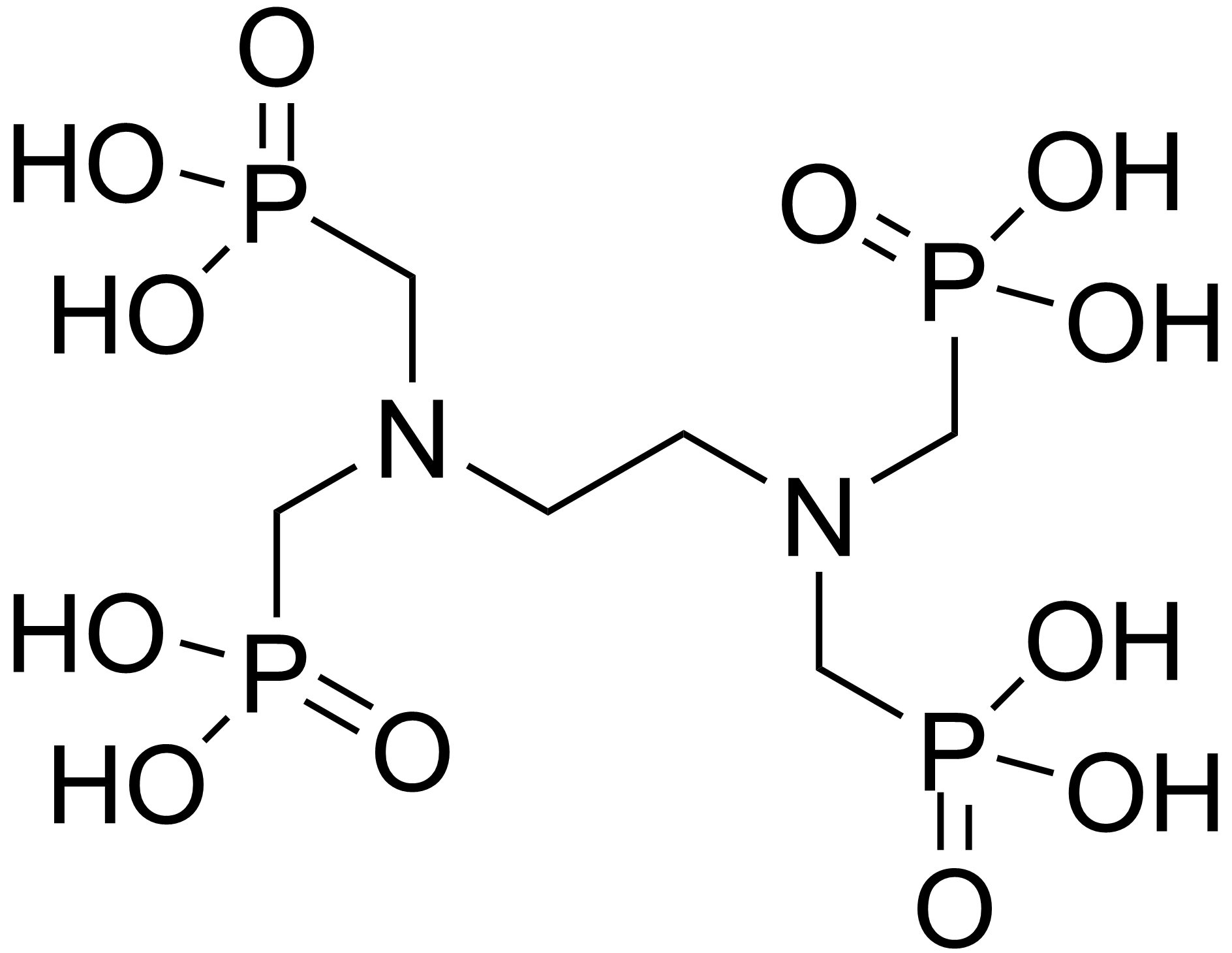

Names
- Preferred IUPAC name {Ethane-1,2-diylbis[nitrilobis(methylene)]}tetrakis(phosphonic acid)
- Other names Ethylenediamine tetra(methylene phosphonic acid), EDTMP

Identifiers
CAS Number	1429-50-1
3D model (JSmol)	Interactive image
ChemSpider	14301
ECHA InfoCard	100.014.410
PubChem CID	15025
UNII	V4CP8RSX7V
CompTox Dashboard (EPA)	DTXSID3061689
- InChI: InChI=1S/C6H20N2O12P4/c9-21(10,11)3-7(4-22(12,13)14)1-2-8(5-23(15,16)17)6-24(18,19)20/h1-6H2,(H2,9,10,11)(H2,12,13,14)(H2,15,16,17)(H2,18,19,20) Key: NFDRPXJGHKJRLJ-UHFFFAOYSA-N; InChI=1/C6H20N2O12P4/c9-21(10,11)3-7(4-22(12,13)14)1-2-8(5-23(15,16)17)6-24(18,19)20/h1-6H2,(H2,9,10,11)(H2,12,13,14)(H2,15,16,17)(H2,18,19,20) Key: NFDRPXJGHKJRLJ-UHFFFAOYAV
- SMILES: O=P(O)(O)CN(CP(=O)(O)O)CCN(CP(=O)(O)O)CP(=O)(O)O

Properties
Chemical formula	C_{6}H_{20}N_{2}O_{12}P_{4}
Molar mass	436.13
Appearance	solid
Solubility in water	limited
- Except where otherwise noted, data are given for materials in their standard state (at 25 °C [77 °F], 100 kPa). verify (what is ?) Infobox references

EDTMP or ethylenediamine tetra(methylene phosphonic acid) is a phosphonic acid. It has chelating and anti corrosion properties. EDTMP is the phosphonate analog of EDTA. It is classified as a nitrogenous organic polyphosphonic acid.

== Properties and applications ==
EDTMP is normally delivered as its sodium salt, which exhibits good solubility in water.

Used in water treatment as an antiscaling and anti corrosion agent, the corrosion inhibition of EDTMP is 3–5 times better than that of inorganic polyphosphate. It can degrade to Aminomethylphosphonic acid. It shows excellent scale inhibition ability under temperature 200 °C. It functions by chelating with many metal ions.

The anti-cancer drug Samarium (^{153}Sm) lexidronam is also derived from EDTMP.
