= Aminomethylphosphonic acid =

Names
- Preferred IUPAC name (Aminomethyl)phosphonic acid
- Other names Aminomethanephosphonic acid

Identifiers
CAS Number	1066-51-9
3D model (JSmol)	Interactive image
Abbreviations	AMPA; AMeP
ChEBI	CHEBI:28812
ChemSpider	13399
ECHA InfoCard	100.152.014
PubChem CID	14017
UNII	90825O5C1U
CompTox Dashboard (EPA)	DTXSID5037490
- InChI: InChI=1S/CH6NO3P/c2-1-6(3,4)5/h1-2H2,(H2,3,4,5) Key: MGRVRXRGTBOSHW-UHFFFAOYSA-N; InChI=1/CH6NO3P/c2-1-6(3,4)5/h1-2H2,(H2,3,4,5) Key: MGRVRXRGTBOSHW-UHFFFAOYAF
- SMILES: O=P(O)(O)CN

Properties
Chemical formula	CH_{6}NO_{3}P
Molar mass	111.037 g·mol^{−1}
Appearance	Solid
Melting point	338 to 344 °C (640 to 651 °F; 611 to 617 K)
Acidity (pK_{a})	0.4
- Except where otherwise noted, data are given for materials in their standard state (at 25 °C [77 °F], 100 kPa). Infobox references

Aminomethylphosphonic acid (AMPA) is a aminophosphonate with a weak phosphonic acid group.

== Application ==
AMPA apparently can be used as biocide and pesticide. AMPA is also used in research to assess the exposure of glyphosate.

Structures of AMPA in different pH ranges

== Environmental fate ==
AMPA is one of the primary degradation products of the herbicide glyphosate. In addition, it is a degradation product of other aminophosphonates, which have applications as antiscalant and water treatment.

AMPA was found in the final effluent of some wastewater treatment plants at concentrations of up to 10μg/l. AMPA can be detected after membrane filtration. AMPA has the potential to be broken down further by manganese oxide in laboratory conditions, however in soil manganese oxide is usually only present in trace amounts. Microbial degradation of AMPA is the more likely degradation pathway, where it degrades into phosphoric acid and ultimately to carbon dioxide and inorganic phosphate.

== Toxicity ==
AMPA is likely the major toxic metabolite of glyphosate and it is therefore considered to be of similar toxicological concern (harmful in greater than 0.5 parts per million) as glyphosate itself.
