= Diphenylphosphine oxide =

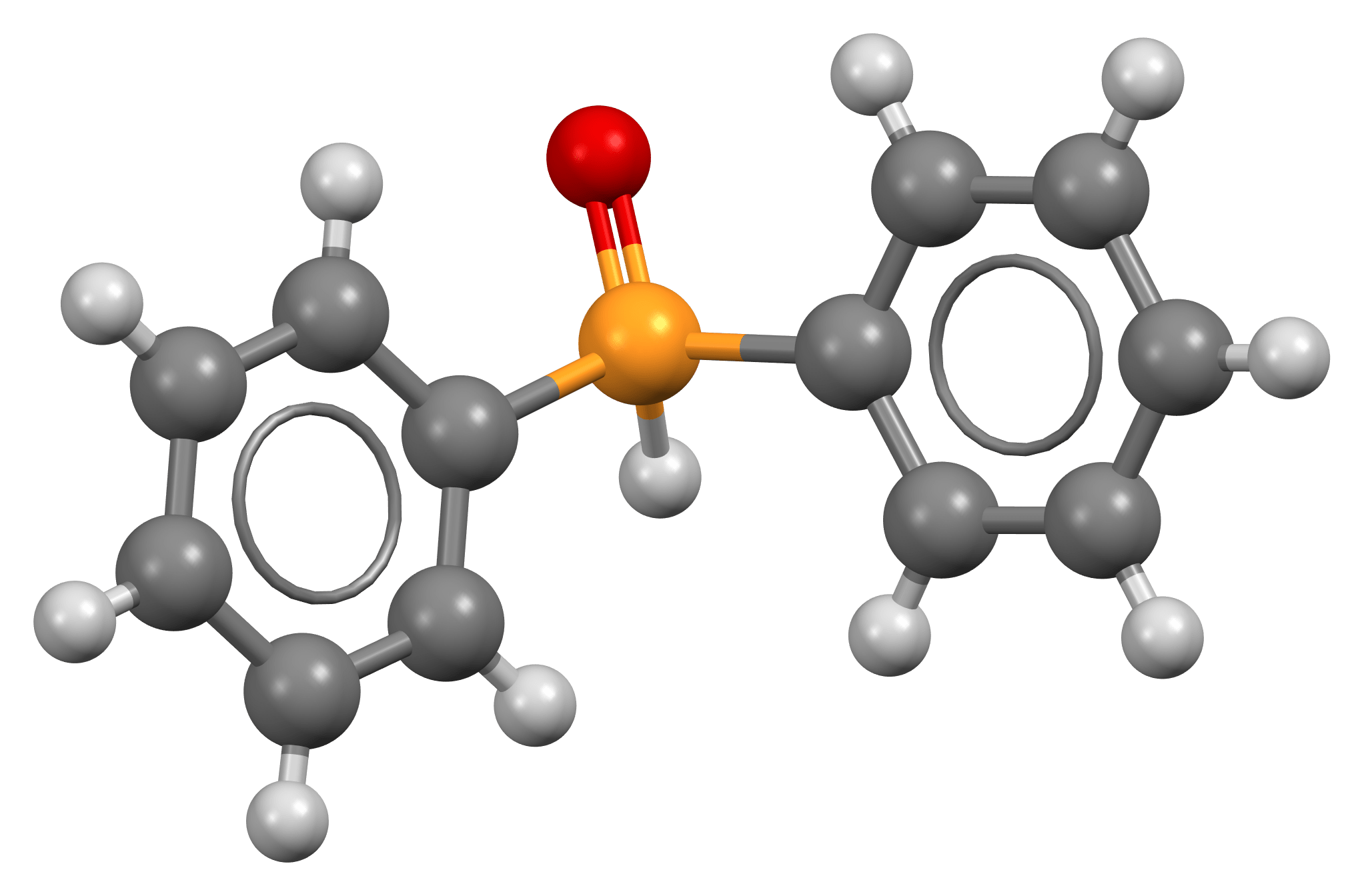
- Ball-and-stick model of the diphenylphosphine oxide molecule

Names
- Preferred IUPAC name Diphenyl-λ^{5}-phosphanone

Identifiers
CAS Number	4559-70-0
3D model (JSmol)	Interactive image
ChemSpider	222625
PubChem CID	254003
UNII	XXW49HG6X3
- InChI: InChI=1S/C12H11OP/c13-14(11-7-3-1-4-8-11)12-9-5-2-6-10-12/h1-10,14H Key: ASUOLLHGALPRFK-UHFFFAOYSA-N
- SMILES: c1ccc(cc1)P(=O)c2ccccc2

Properties
Chemical formula	C_{12}H_{11}OP
Molar mass	202.19
Appearance	white solid
Melting point	56-57 °C
- Except where otherwise noted, data are given for materials in their standard state (at 25 °C [77 °F], 100 kPa). Infobox references

Diphenylphosphine oxide is an organophosphorus compound with the formula (C_{6}H_{5})_{2}P(O)H. It is a white solid that is soluble in polar organic solvents.

== Synthesis ==
Diphenylphosphine oxide can be prepared by the reaction of phosphonic esters, such as diethylphosphite, with Grignard reagents followed by acid workup:

(C_{2}H_{5}O)_{2}P(O)H + 3 C_{6}H_{5}MgBr → (C_{6}H_{5})_{2}P(O)MgBr + C_{2}H_{5}OMgBr
(C_{6}H_{5})_{2}P(O)MgBr + HCl → (C_{6}H_{5})_{2}P(O)H + MgBrCl

Alternatively, it may be prepared by the partial hydrolysis of chlorodiphenylphosphine or diphenylphosphine.

== Reactions ==
Diphenylphosphine oxide exists in equilibrium with its minor tautomer diphenylphosphinous acid, ((C_{6}H_{5})_{2}POH:

(C_{6}H_{5})_{2}P(O)H ⇌ (C_{6}H_{5})_{2}POH

Diphenylphosphine oxide is used in Buchwald-Hartwig coupling reactions to introduce diphenylphosphino substituents.

Thionyl chloride converts diphenylphosphine oxide to chlorodiphenylphosphine.

Organophosphinous acids are deoxygenated with DIBAH. The resulting secondary phosphines are precursors to phosphine ligands.
