= Samarium (153Sm) lexidronam =

Chemical compound

Samarium (^{153}Sm) lexidronam

Clinical data
- Trade names: Quadramet
- Routes of administration: Intravenous
- ATC code: V10BX02 (WHO)

Legal status
- Legal status: EU: Rx-only; In general: ℞ (Prescription only)

Pharmacokinetic data
- Bioavailability: N/A

Identifiers
- IUPAC name: Pentasodium samarium (^{153}Sm) N,N,N',N'-tetrakis(phosphonatomethyl)ethane-1,2-diamine
- CAS Number: 122575-21-7 176669-18-4 (pentasodium)
- PubChem CID: 9810246
- UNII: 745X144DZY
- ChEMBL: ChEMBL1201796
- CompTox Dashboard (EPA): DTXSID30936282

Chemical and physical data
- Formula: C_{6}H_{12}N_{2}Na_{5}O_{12}P_{4}^{153}Sm
- Molar mass: 695.93 g/mol
- 3D model (JSmol): Interactive image; covalent form: Interactive image
- SMILES: C(CN(CP(=O)([O-])[O-])CP(=O)([O-])[O-])N(CP(=O)([O-])[O-])CP(=O)([O-])[O-].[Na+].[Na+].[Na+].[Na+].[Na+].[153Sm+3]; covalent form: C(CN(CP(=O)([O-])O[153Sm-]123)CP(=O)([O-])O1)N(CP(=O)([O-])O2)CP(=O)([O-])O3.[Na+].[Na+].[Na+].[Na+].[Na+]

Samarium (^{153}Sm) lexidronam (chemical name Samarium-153-ethylene diamine tetramethylene phosphonate, abbreviated Samarium-153 EDTMP, trade name Quadramet) is a chelated complex of a radioisotope of the element samarium with EDTMP. It is used to treat pain when cancer has spread to the bone.

It is injected into a vein and distributed throughout the body, where it is preferentially absorbed in areas where cancer has invaded the bone. The radioisotope ^{153}Sm, with a half-life of 46.3 hours, decays by emitting beta particles (electrons), which kill the nearby cells. Pain begins to improve in the first week for most people and the effects can last several months. It is commonly used in lung cancer, prostate cancer, breast cancer, and osteosarcoma.

== Side effects ==
Side effects include the following:

- Black, tarry stools
- Blood in urine/stool
- Cough, hoarseness
- Fever/chills
- Lower back/side pain
- Painful or difficult urination
- Pinpoint red spots on skin
- Irregular heartbeat
- Nausea, vomiting

== Supply and administration ==
Samarium lexidronam is supplied as a frozen solution for intravenous use with an activity of 50±5 mCi/mL and a maximum beta energy of 0.808 MeV. Due to the short half-life of the radioisotope, the drug expires 56 hours after the noted calibration time.
