= Pudovik reaction =

Chemical reaction

In organophosphorus chemistry, the Pudovik reaction is a method for preparing α-aminomethylphosphonates. Under basic conditions, the phosphorus–hydrogen bond of a dialkylphosphite, (RO)_{2}P(O)H, adds across the carbon–nitrogen double bond of an imine (a hydrophosphonylation reaction). The reaction is closely related to the three-component Kabachnik–Fields reaction, where an amine, phosphite, and an organic carbonyl compound are condensed, which was reported independently by Martin Kabachnik and Ellis Fields in 1952. In the Pudovik reaction, a generic imine, RCH=NR', would react with a phosphorous reagent like diethylphosphite as follows:

RCH=NR' + (EtO)_{2}P(O)H → (EtO)_{2}P(O)CHR-NHR'

In addition to the Lewis-acid catalyzed Pudovik reaction, the reaction may be carried out in the presence of chiral amine bases. Catalytic amounts of quinine, for instance, promote the enantioselective Pudovik reaction of aryl aldehydes. Catalytic, enantioselective variants of the Pudovik reaction have been developed.
