= DTPMP =

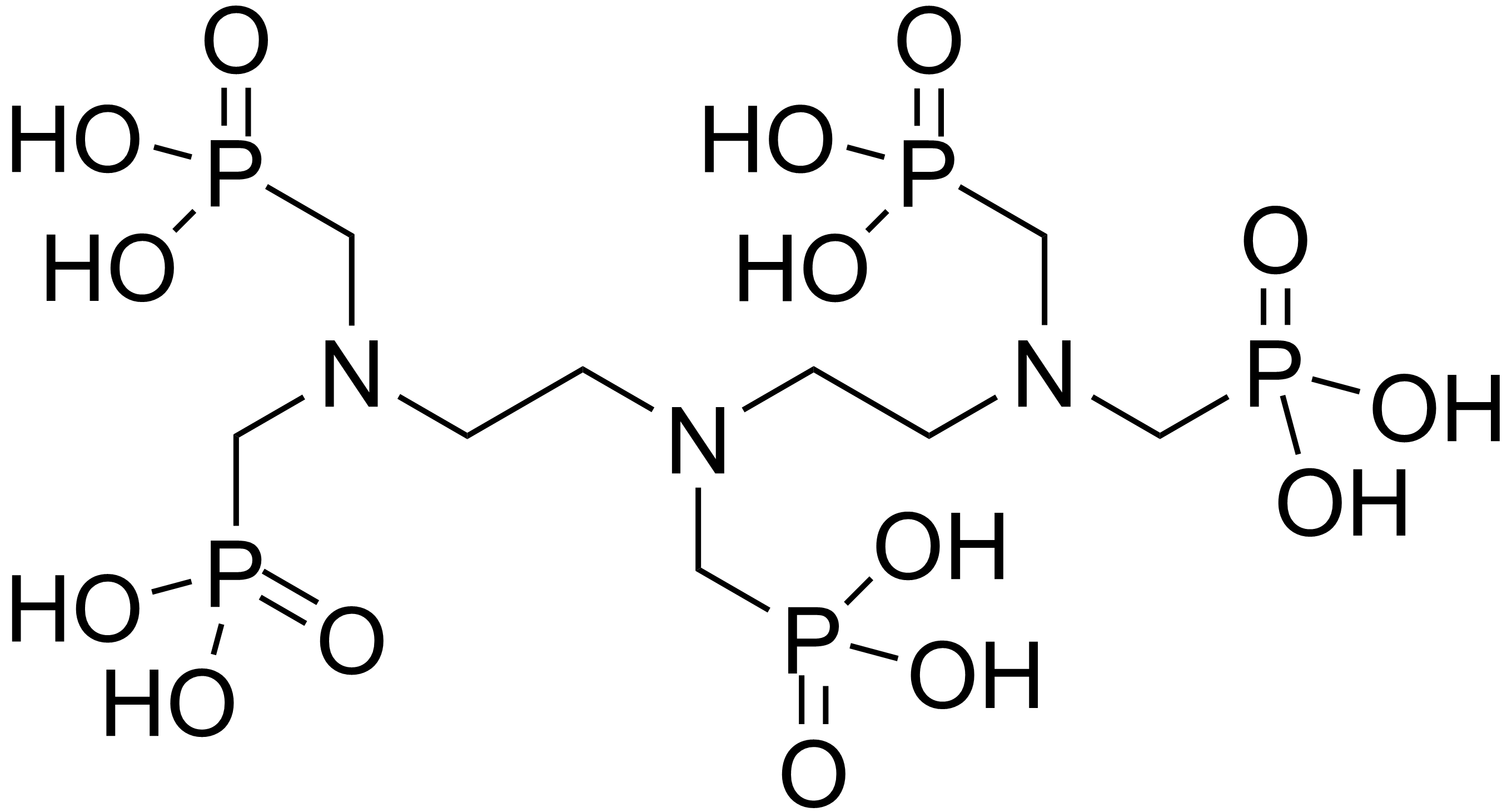

Names
- Preferred IUPAC name {[(Phosphonomethyl)azanediyl]bis[ethane-2,1-diylnitrilobis(methylene)]}tetrakis(phosphonic acid)
- Other names DTPMPA, Diethylenetriaminepenta(methylene-phosphonic acid)

Identifiers
CAS Number	15827-60-8
3D model (JSmol)	Interactive image
ChemSpider	76777
ECHA InfoCard	100.036.287
PubChem CID	85128
UNII	0Q75589TM3
CompTox Dashboard (EPA)	DTXSID0027775
- InChI: InChI=1S/C9H28N3O15P5/c13-28(14,15)5-10(1-3-11(6-29(16,17)18)7-30(19,20)21)2-4-12(8-31(22,23)24)9-32(25,26)27/h1-9H2,(H2,13,14,15)(H2,16,17,18)(H2,19,20,21)(H2,22,23,24)(H2,25,26,27) Key: DUYCTCQXNHFCSJ-UHFFFAOYSA-N; InChI=1/C9H28N3O15P5/c13-28(14,15)5-10(1-3-11(6-29(16,17)18)7-30(19,20)21)2-4-12(8-31(22,23)24)9-32(25,26)27/h1-9H2,(H2,13,14,15)(H2,16,17,18)(H2,19,20,21)(H2,22,23,24)(H2,25,26,27) Key: DUYCTCQXNHFCSJ-UHFFFAOYAC
- SMILES: O=P(O)(O)CN(CP(=O)(O)O)CCN(CCN(CP(=O)(O)O)CP(=O)(O)O)CP(=O)(O)O

Properties
Chemical formula	C_{9}H_{28}N_{3}O_{15}P_{5}
Molar mass	573.198 g·mol^{−1}
Appearance	Solid
- Except where otherwise noted, data are given for materials in their standard state (at 25 °C [77 °F], 100 kPa). verify (what is ?) Infobox references

DTPMP or diethylenetriamine penta(methylene phosphonic acid) is a phosphonic acid. It has chelating and anti-corrosion properties.

== Properties ==
DTPMP is normally delivered as salts, because the acid form has very limited solubility in water and tends to crystallize in concentrated aqueous solutions. It is a nitrogenous organic polyphosphonic acid. It shows very good inhibition of the precipitation of barium sulfate (BaSO_{4}). At high alkali and high temperature (above 210 °C) environments DTPMPA has better scale and corrosion inhibition effect than other phosphonates.

== Applications ==
- Detergents and cleaning agents
- Water treatment
- Scaling inhibitor
- Chelating agent
- Deflocculation agent / settling retarder
- Anti corrosion agent
