= ATMP =

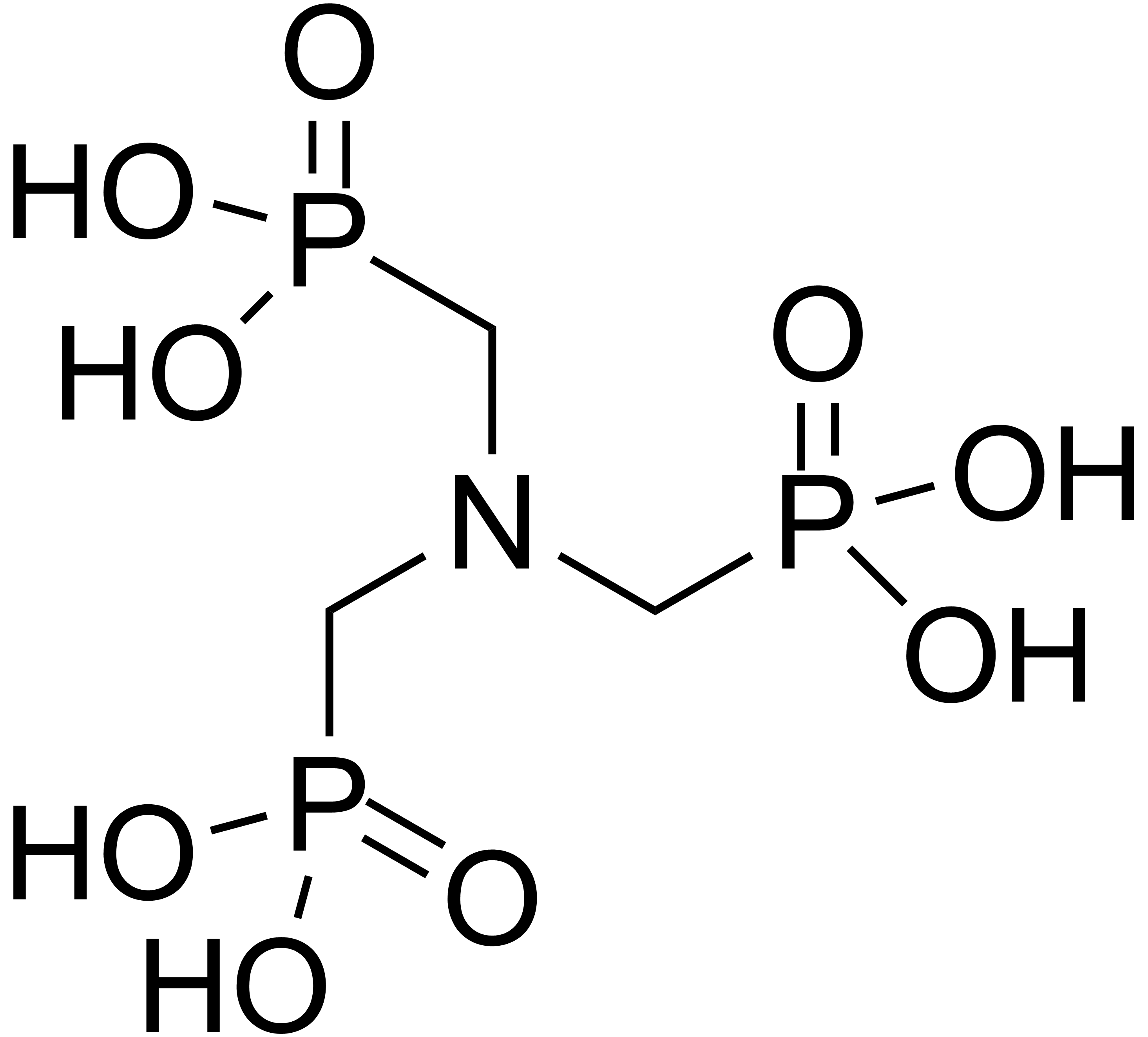

Names
- Preferred IUPAC name [Nitrilotris(methylene)]tris(phosphonic acid)
- Other names: Tris(phosphonomethyl)amine; Nitrilotrimethylphosphonic acid; Aminotris(methylphosphonic acid); ATMP; NTMP

Identifiers
CAS Number	6419-19-8
3D model (JSmol)	Interactive image
ChEMBL	ChEMBL260191
ChemSpider	15833
ECHA InfoCard	100.026.496
EC Number	229-146-5
PubChem CID	16698
UNII	1Y702GD0FG
CompTox Dashboard (EPA)	DTXSID2027624
- InChI: InChI=1S/C3H12NO9P3/c5-14(6,7)1-4(2-15(8,9)10)3-16(11,12)13/h1-3H2,(H2,5,6,7)(H2,8,9,10)(H2,11,12,13) Key: YDONNITUKPKTIG-UHFFFAOYSA-N; InChI=1/C3H12NO9P3/c5-14(6,7)1-4(2-15(8,9)10)3-16(11,12)13/h1-3H2,(H2,5,6,7)(H2,8,9,10)(H2,11,12,13) Key: YDONNITUKPKTIG-UHFFFAOYAN
- SMILES: O=P(O)(O)CN(CP(=O)(O)O)CP(=O)(O)O

Properties
Chemical formula	C_{3}H_{12}NO_{9}P_{3}
Molar mass	299.048 g·mol^{−1}
Appearance	White solid
Density	1.33 g/cm^{3} (20 °C)
Melting point	200 °C (392 °F; 473 K) decomposes
Solubility in water	61 g/100 mL
- Except where otherwise noted, data are given for materials in their standard state (at 25 °C [77 °F], 100 kPa). verify (what is ?) Infobox references

ATMP or aminotris(methylenephosphonic acid) is a phosphonic acid with chemical formula N(CH_{2}PO_{3}H_{2})_{3}. It is a colorless solid. Its conjugate bases, such as [N(CH_{2}PO_{3}H)_{3}]^{3-}, have chelating properties.

ATMP can be synthesized from the Mannich-type reaction of ammonia, formaldehyde, and phosphorous acid, in a manner similar to the Kabachnik–Fields reaction.

== Properties ==
ATMP has good antiscale performance. It is related structurally to nitrilotriacetic acid.

== Applications ==
- Detergents and cleaning agents
- Fouling
- Inhibition
- Water treatment

== Related compounds ==
- (1-Aminoethylidene)bisphosphonic acid, CH_{3}C(NH_{2})[PO(OH)_{2}]_{2}, also a chelating agent
- Etidronic acid, CH_{3}C(OH)[PO(OH)_{2}]_{2}, also a chelating agent
- Glyphosate, HO_{2}CCH_{2}NHCH_{2}[PO(OH)_{2}]_{2}, a herbicide
