= Diisopropyl phosphite =

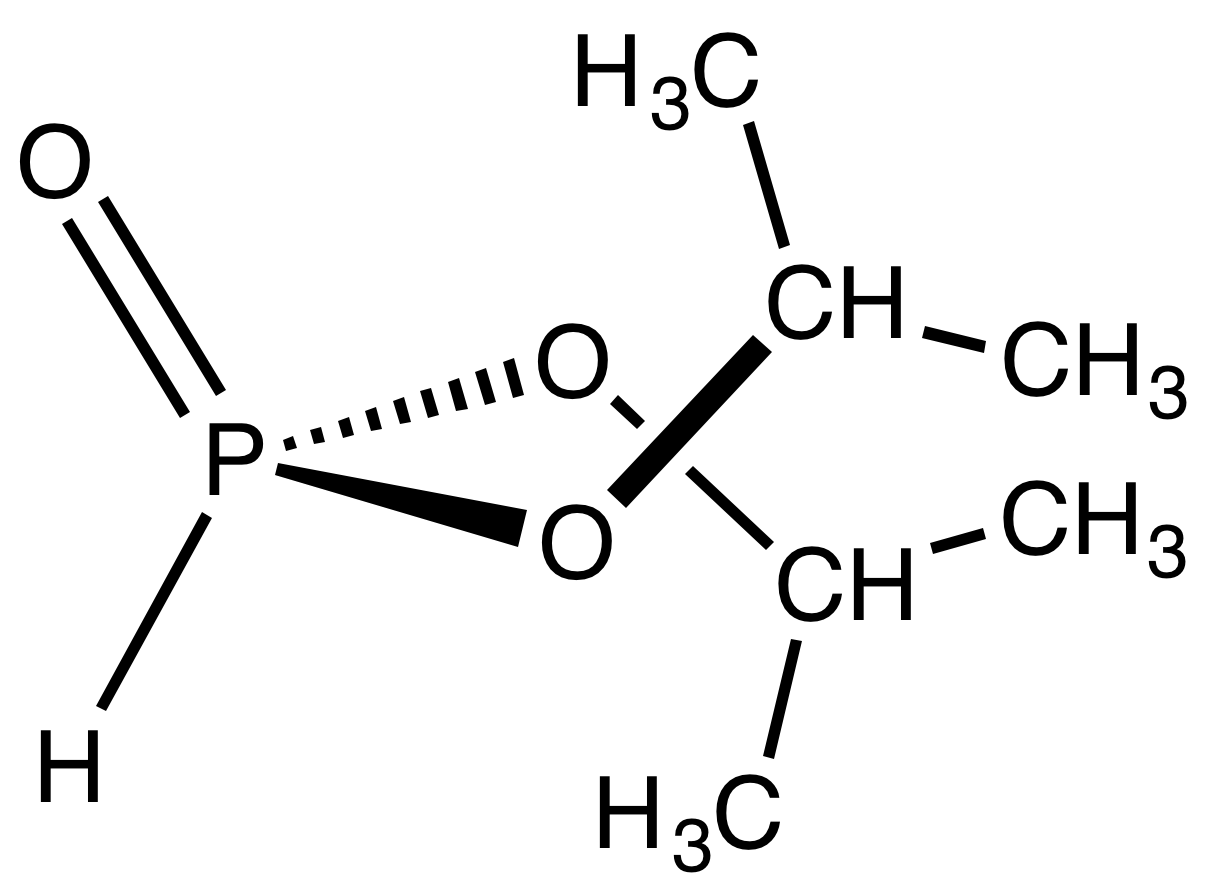

Names
- Preferred IUPAC name Di(propan-2-yl) phosphonate
- Other names Phosphonic acid, diisopropyl ester, diisopropyl phosphonate

Identifiers
CAS Number	1809-20-7
3D model (JSmol)	Interactive image
ChemSpider	485223
EC Number	217-317-7
PubChem CID	558181
UNII	676G4RQ6ND
- InChI: InChI=1S/C6H15O3P/c1-5(2)8-10(7)9-6(3)4/h5-7H,1-4H3 Key: NFORZJQPTUSMRL-UHFFFAOYSA-N
- SMILES: CC(C)OP(O)OC(C)C

Properties
Chemical formula	C_{6}H_{15}O_{3}P
Molar mass	166.157 g·mol^{−1}
Appearance	colorless liquid
- Except where otherwise noted, data are given for materials in their standard state (at 25 °C [77 °F], 100 kPa). Infobox references

Diisopropyl phosphite is an organophosphorus compound with the formula (i-PrO)_{2}P(O)H (i-Pr = CH(CH_{3})_{2}). The molecule is tetrahedral. It is a colorless viscous liquid. The compounds can be prepared by treating phosphorus trichloride with isopropanol.
