= Kabachnik–Fields reaction =

Chemical reaction

In organophosphorus chemistry, the Kabachnik–Fields reaction is a three-component organic reaction forming α-aminomethylphosphonates from an amine, a carbonyl compound, and a dialkyl phosphonate, (RO)_{2}P(O)H (that are also called dialkylphosphites). Aminophosphonates are synthetic targets of some importance as phosphorus analogues of α-amino acids (a bioisostere). This multicomponent reaction was independently discovered by Martin Kabachnik and Ellis K. Fields in 1952. The reaction is very similar to the two-component Pudovik reaction, which involves condensation of the phosphite and a preformed imine.

The first step in this reaction is the formation of an imine, followed by a hydrophosphonylation step where the phosphonate P–H bond across the C=N double bond. The starting carbonyl component is usually an aldehyde and sometimes a ketone. The reaction can be accelerated with a combination of dehydrating reagent and Lewis acid.

Enantioselective variants of the Kabachnik–Fields reaction have been developed, for example employing α-methylbenzylamine provides a chiral, non-racemic α-aminophosphonate.

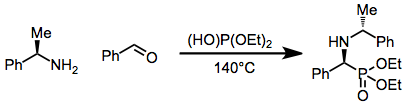
