= Phosphite (ion) =

Ion

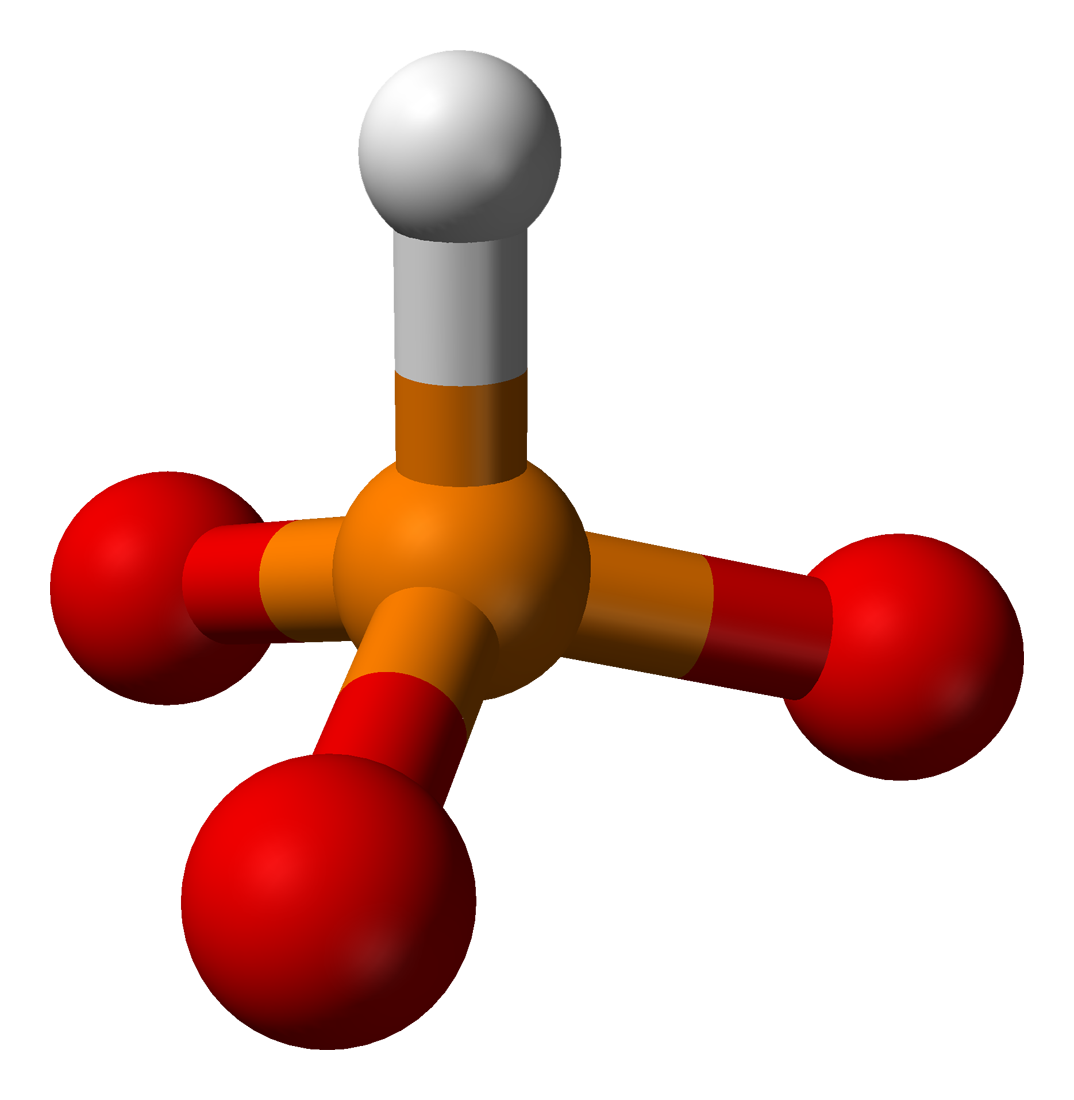

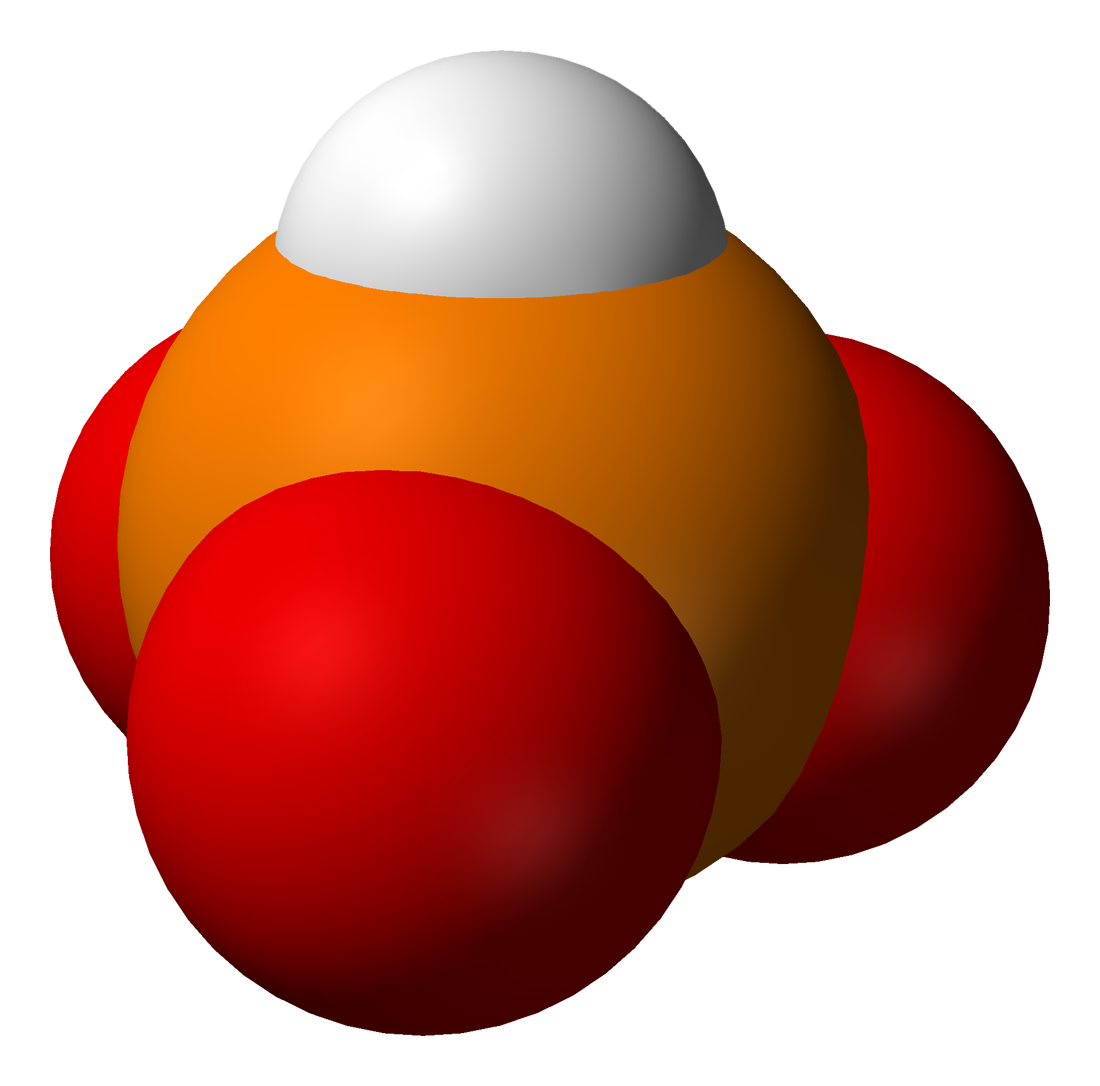

Names
- IUPAC name Phosphonate
- Systematic IUPAC name Phosphite

Identifiers
CAS Number	15477-76-6
3D model (JSmol)	hypervalent form: Interactive image; ionic form: Interactive image
ChEBI	CHEBI:16215
ChemSpider	10449627
Gmelin Reference	1618
MeSH	Phosphorite
PubChem CID	406
CompTox Dashboard (EPA)	DTXSID80164154
- InChI: InChI=1S/O3P/c1-4(2)3/q-3 Key: AQSJGOWTSHOLKH-UHFFFAOYSA-N
- SMILES: hypervalent form: P([O-])([O-])=O; ionic form: [H][P+]([O-])([O-])[O-]

Properties
Chemical formula	HPO^{2−}_{3}
Molar mass	79.9810 g mol^{−1}

Related compounds
Other anions	Phosphinite; Phosphonite; Fluorophosphite
- Except where otherwise noted, data are given for materials in their standard state (at 25 °C [77 °F], 100 kPa). verify (what is ?) Infobox references

A phosphite ion in inorganic chemistry usually refers to [HPO_{3}]^{2−} but includes [H_{2}PO_{3}]^{−} ([HPO_{2}(OH)]^{−}). These anions are the conjugate bases of phosphorous acid (H_{3}PO_{3}). The corresponding salts, e.g. sodium phosphite (Na_{2}HPO_{3}) are reducing in character.

== Nomenclature ==
The IUPAC recommended name for phosphorous acid is phosphonic acid. Correspondingly, the IUPAC-recommended name for the HPO^{2−}_{3} ion is phosphonate. In the US the IUPAC naming conventions for inorganic compounds are taught at high school, but not as a 'required' part of the curriculum. A well-known university-level textbook follows the IUPAC recommendations. In practice any reference to "phosphite" should be investigated to determine the naming convention being employed.

== Salts containing HPO_{3}^{2−}, called phosphonates or phosphites ==
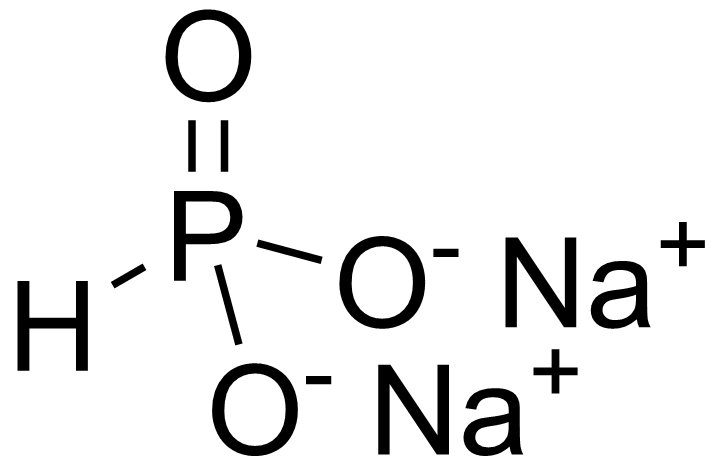
Structural formula of Na_{2}HPO_{3}. The anion has C_{3v} symmetry.

From the commercial perspective, the most important phosphite salt is basic lead phosphite. Many salts containing the phosphite ion have been investigated structurally, these include sodium phosphite pentahydrate (Na_{2}HPO_{3}·5H_{2}O). (NH_{4})_{2}HPO_{3}·H_{2}O, CuHPO_{3}·H_{2}O, SnHPO_{3} and Al_{2}(HPO_{3})_{3}·4H_{2}O. The structure of HPO^{2−}_{3} is approximately tetrahedral.

HPO^{2−}_{3} has a number of canonical resonance forms making it isoelectronic with bisulfite ion, HSO^{−}_{3}, which has a similar structure.

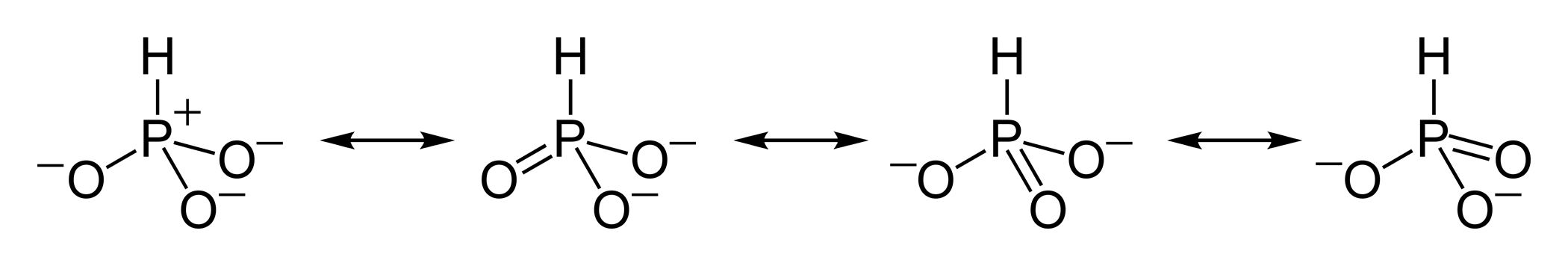

== Salts containing HP(O)_{2}OH^{−} ==
Acid or hydrogen phosphites are called hydrogenphosphonates or acid phosphites. IUPAC recommends the name hydrogenphosphonates). They are anions HP(O)_{2}OH^{−}. A typical derivative is the salt [NH_{4}][HP(O)_{2}OH]. Many related salts are known, e.g., RbHPHO_{3}, CsHPHO_{3}, TlHPHO_{3}. These salts are prepared by treating phosphorous acid with the metal carbonate. These compounds contain a layer polymeric anion consisting of HPO_{3} tetrahedra linked by hydrogen bonds. These layers are interleaved by layers of metal cations.

Organic esters of hydrogen phosphites are anions with the formula HP(O)_{2}OR^{−} (R = organic group). One commercial example is the fungicide fosetyl-Al with the formula [C_{2}H_{5}OP(H)O_{2}]_{3}Al.

== Salts containing H_{2}P_{2}O_{5}^{2−}, called diphosphites or pyrophosphites ==
Pyrophosphites (diphosphites) can be produced by gently heating acid phosphites under reduced pressure. They contain the ion H_{2}P_{2}O^{2−}_{5}, which can be formulated [HP(O)_{2}O−P(O)_{2}H]^{2−}.

An example is potassium diplatinum(II) tetrakispyrophosphite.

== Valence-isoelectronic ions ==
In contrast to the paucity of evidence for PO^{3−}_{3}, the corresponding arsenic ion, ortho-arsenite, AsO^{3−}_{3} is known. An example is Ag_{3}AsO_{3} as well as the polymeric meta-arsenite (AsO^{−}_{2})_{n}. The iso-electronic sulfite ion, SO^{2−}_{3} is known from its salts.

== Use as fungicides ==
Inorganic phosphites (containing HPO^{2−}_{3}) have been applied to crops to combat fungus-like pathogens of the order oomycetes (water molds). The situation is confusing because of the similarity in name between phosphite and phosphate (a major plant nutrient and fertilizer ingredient), and controversial because phosphites have sometimes been advertised as fertilizers, even though they are converted to phosphate too slowly to serve as a plant's main phosphorus source. In fact, phosphites may cause phytotoxicity when a plant is starved of phosphates. Lemoynie and others have described this complicated situation and noted that calling phosphites fertilizers avoided the regulatory complication and negative public perceptions that might have been incurred by registering them as fungicides.

A major form of inorganic phosphite used in agriculture is monopotassium phosphite. This compound does not serve as a phosphorus fertilizer, but does serve as a potassium fertilizer.

== See also ==
- Hypophosphite – H_{2}PO^{−}_{2}
- Organophosphorus
- Phosphine – PH_{3} and the organic phosphines PR_{3}
- Phosphine oxide – OPR_{3}
- Phosphinite – P(OR)R_{2}
- Phosphonite – P(OR)_{2}R
- Phosphinate – OP(OR)R_{2}
- Phosphonate – organic phosphonates OP(OR)_{2}R
- Phosphate – PO^{3−}_{4}
- Organophosphate – OP(OR)_{3}
