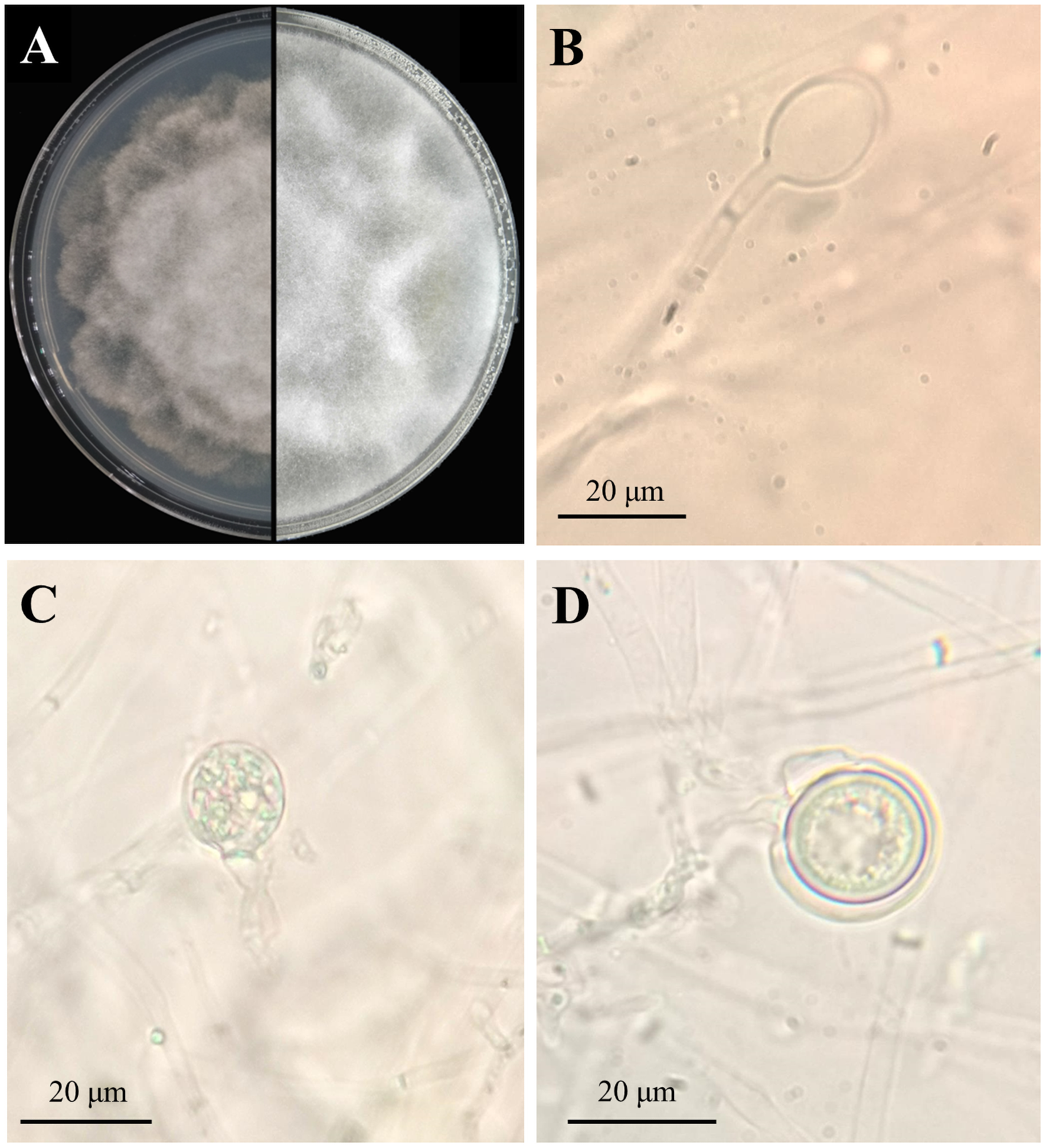
- A: seven-day-old colony on PARP medium; B: sporangia; C: gametangia; D: oospore.

Scientific classification
- Domain: Eukaryota
- Clade: Sar
- Clade: Stramenopiles
- Phylum: Oomycota
- Class: Peronosporomycetes
- Order: Peronosporales
- Family: Peronosporaceae
- Genus: Phytophthora
- Species: P. cinnamomi

Binomial name
- Phytophthora cinnamomi Rands

Varieties
- Phytophthora cinnamomi var. cinnamomi; Phytophthora cinnamomi var. parvispora; Phytophthora cinnamomi var. robiniae

= Phytophthora cinnamomi =

Species of single-celled organism

Phytophthora cinnamomi, also known as cinnamon fungus, is a soil-borne water mould that produces an infection which causes a condition in plants variously called "dieback", "root rot", or (in certain Castanea species), "ink disease".

Once infected soil or water is introduced, the organism can spread rapidly throughout an environment. An infestation can lead to the illness, death, and possible eradication of vulnerable plants, as well as habitat reduction for animals. An outbreak can be challenging to recognize and can inflict irreversible harm to ecosystems.

The plant pathogen is one of the world's most invasive species and is present in over 70 countries around the world.

== Distribution and hosts ==
Phytophthora cinnamomi is distributed worldwide and can infect a diverse range of hosts, including club mosses, ferns, cycads, conifers, cord rushes, grasses, lilies and a large number of species from many dicotyledonous families, and is included in the Invasive Species Specialist Group list of "100 of the World's Worst Invasive Alien Species". Its potential range is expected to extend polewards with warming due to climate change.

It affects a range of economic plants, including food crops such as avocado and pineapple; as well as trees and woody ornamentals such as Fraser firs, shortleaf pines, loblolly pines, azaleas, camellia and boxwood, causing root rot, dieback and death of infected plants. Symptoms include wilting, decreased fruit size and yield, collar rot, gum exudation, necrosis, leaf chlorosis, leaf curl, and stem cankers. It can also cause dieback of young shoots and may interfere with transpiration of roots to shoots. Older plants may not display symptoms or only exhibit mild dieback despite having severe root rot.

== Reproduction ==
Phytophthora cinnamomi is a diploid and primarily heterothallic species with two mating types, A1 and A2. Sexual reproduction in heterothallic Phytophthora species ordinarily occurs when gametangia of opposite mating type interact in host tissue. This interaction leads to the formation of oospores that can survive for long periods in or outside the host. Phytophthora cinnamomi is facultatively homothallic and capable of self-fertilization. Cultures of mating type A2 can be induced to undergo sexual reproduction by damaging conditions such as exposure to hydrogen peroxide or mechanical damage.

== Life cycle ==
Phytophthora cinnamomi lives in the soil and in plant tissues and can spread in water. During periods of harsh environmental conditions, the organisms become dormant chlamydospores. When environmental conditions are suitable, the chlamydospores germinate, producing mycelia (or hyphae) and sporangia. The sporangia ripen and release zoospores, which infect plant roots by entering the root behind the root tip. Zoospores need water to move through the soil, therefore infection is most likely in moist soils. After entering the root, mycelia grow throughout the root absorbing carbohydrates and nutrients and destroy the structure of the root tissues, "rotting" the root and preventing the plant from absorbing water and nutrients. Sporangia and chlamydospores form on the mycelia of the infected root allowing further dispersal.

== Transmission ==
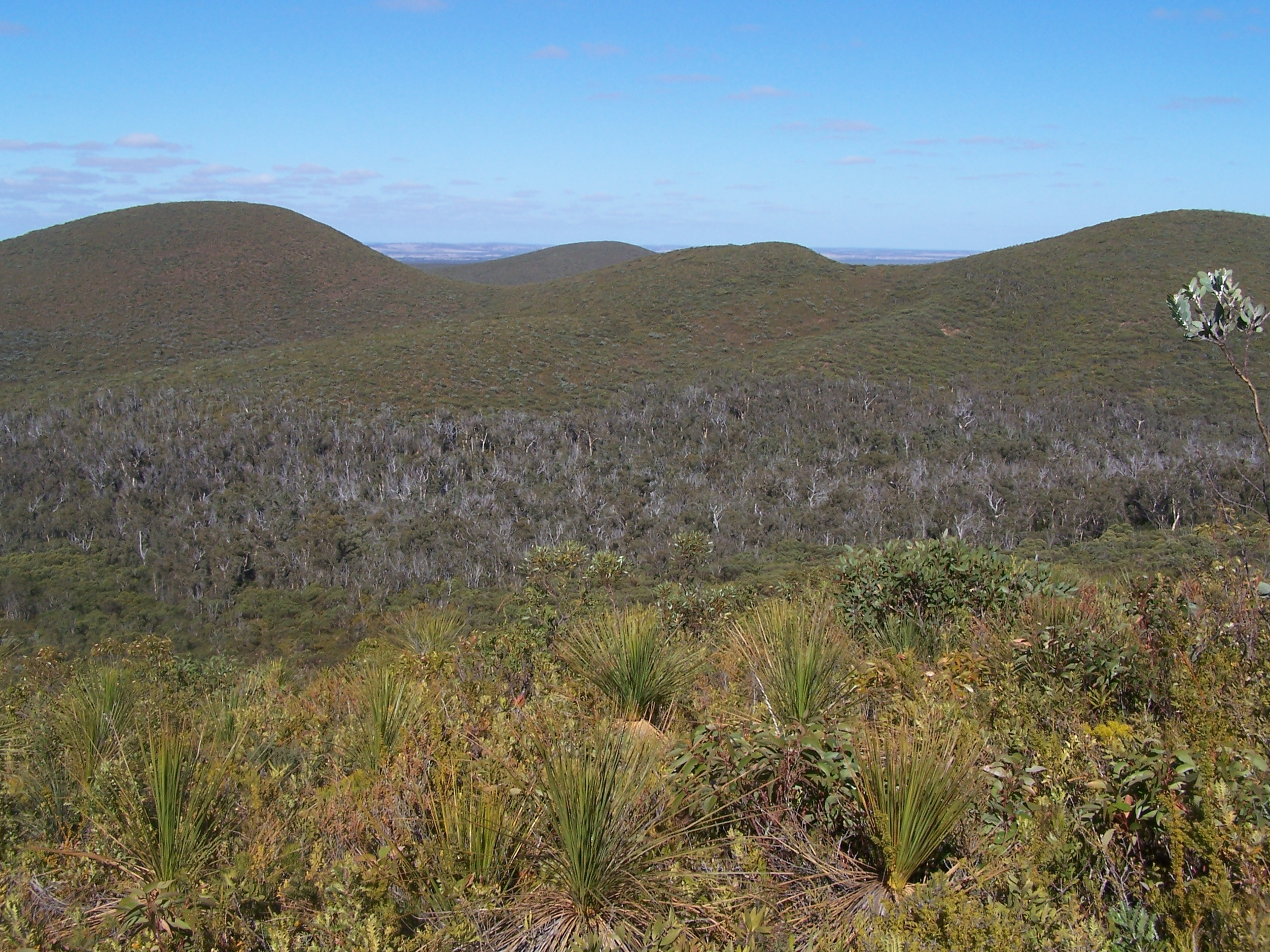
A heath landscape in the Stirling Range, Western Australia, with a dieback-infested valley in the mid ground

Although P. cinnamomi was first identified in tropical and subtropical countries, it can survive and develop in cooler climates as well. It spreads as zoospores and/or chlamydospores in soil and water under favourable conditions such as warm temperatures and high soil moisture.

Methods of transmission include local invasion via contact between the roots of infected and susceptible plants, downslope movement in surface or subsurface water such as rivers or irrigation water, zoospore dispersal over long distances via wind-blown soil and debris, and transport of infected plant matter and soil, for example via particles stuck to footwear, vehicles or equipment. Native and feral animals have been known to transport the disease, including through the digestive tract of feral pigs. However human activities such as timber harvesting, mining, bush walking, and road construction are also major methods of dispersal.

== Environmental impacts ==
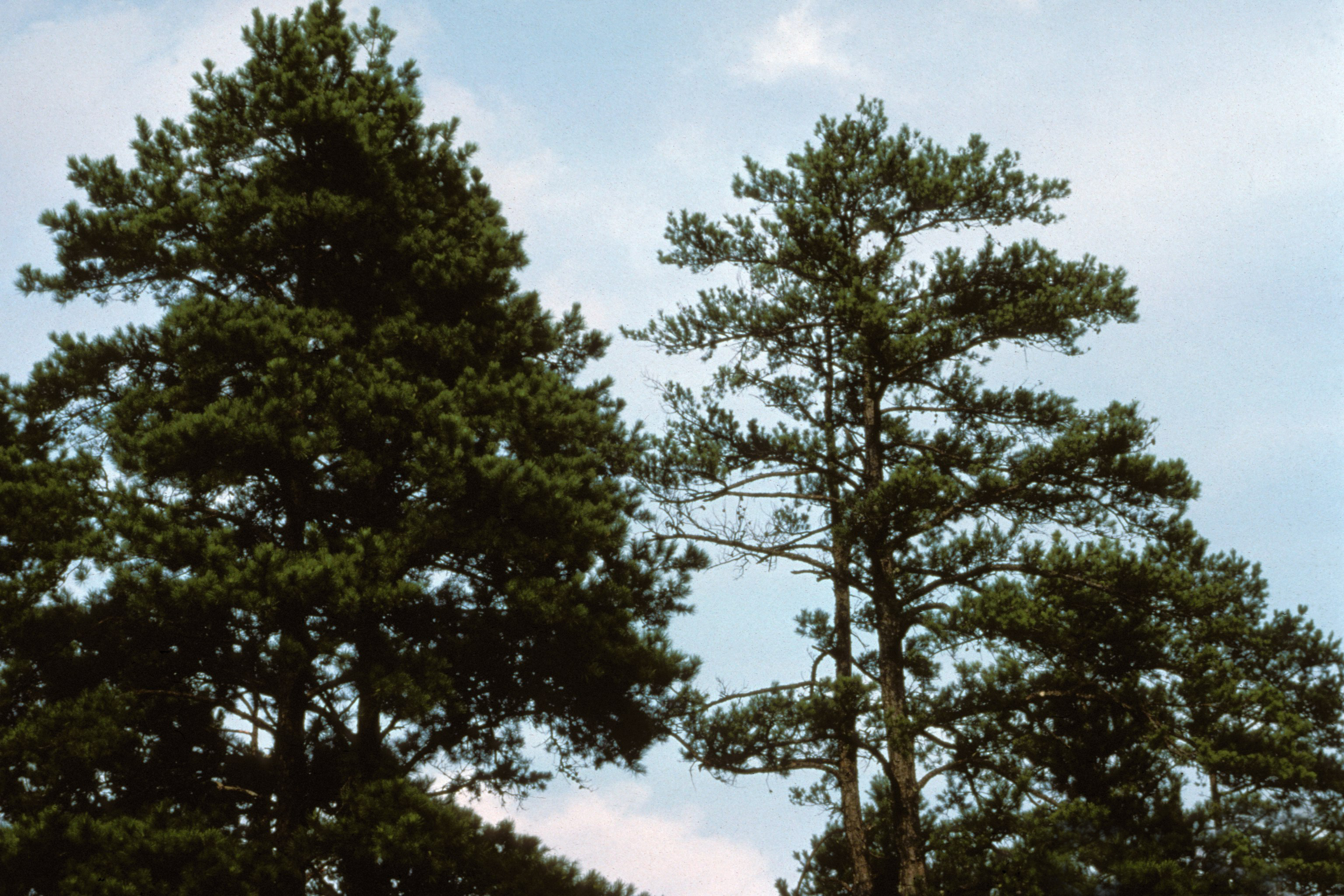
Littleleaf disease in Pinus spp. The tree on the left shows no symptoms of infection while the tree on the right shows stunted leaf growth characteristic of Phytophthora cinnamomi infection.

When Phytophthora dieback spreads to native plant communities, it kills many susceptible plants, resulting in a permanent decline in the biodiversity and a disruption of ecosystem processes. It can also change the composition of the forest or native plant community by increasing the number of resistant plants and reducing the number of susceptible plant species. Native animals that rely on susceptible plants for survival are reduced in numbers or are eliminated from sites infested by Phytophthora dieback.

=== Australia ===
In Australia, where it is known as phytophthora dieback, dieback, jarrah dieback or cinnamon fungus, Phytophthora cinnamomi can infect thousands of native plants, causing damage to forests and removing habitats for wildlife. Several native plants are at risk of extinction due to the effects of the disease.

Phytophthora cinnamomi's impact is greatest in Western Australia, Victoria, Tasmania and South Australia, while the Northern Territory remains unaffected due to the unfavourability of the environment.

Of particular concern is the infection and dieback of large areas of forest and heathland which support threatened species in the south-west Western Australia. Many plants from the genera Banksia, Darwinia, Grevillea, Leucopogon, Verticordia and Xanthorrhoea are susceptible. This in turn impacts on animals reliant on these plants for food and shelter, such as the southwestern pygmy possum (Cercartetus concinnus) and the honey possum (Tarsipes rostratus). A study in the Perth region found that dieback caused a significant shift in the bird community and affected nectar-feeding species the most, with fewer species such as the Western Spinebill in areas that were dieback-infested.

=== New Zealand ===
In New Zealand, Phytophthora cinnamomi causes disease on a variety of plants, but the primary disease of the endemic Kauri tree Agathis australis, causing 'Kauri dieback' disease is Phytophthora agathidicida.

=== U.S. and Mexico ===
Damage to forests suspected to be caused by Phytophthora cinnamomi was first recorded in the United States about 200 years ago. Infection can cause littleleaf disease of shortleaf pine (Pinus echinata), Christmas tree disease in nursery grown Fraser fir (Abies fraseri), and sudden death of a number of native tree species such as American chestnut. Oak populations are affected in areas ranging from South Carolina to Texas.

Phytophthora cinnamomi is also a problem in the Mexican state of Colima, killing several native oak species and other susceptible vegetation in the surrounding woodlands. It is implicated in the die-off of the rare endemic shrub Ione manzanita (Arctostaphylos myrtifolia) in California.

== Commercial effects ==
Phytophthora cinnamomi is the leading cause of damage to avocado trees, and is commonly known as "root rot" amongst avocado farmers. Since the 1940s various breeds of root rot-resistant avocados have been developed to minimize tree damage. Damaged trees generally die or become unproductive within three to five years. A 1960 study of the Fallbrook, California, area correlated higher levels of avocado root rot to soils with poorer drainage and greater clay content.

== Control ==
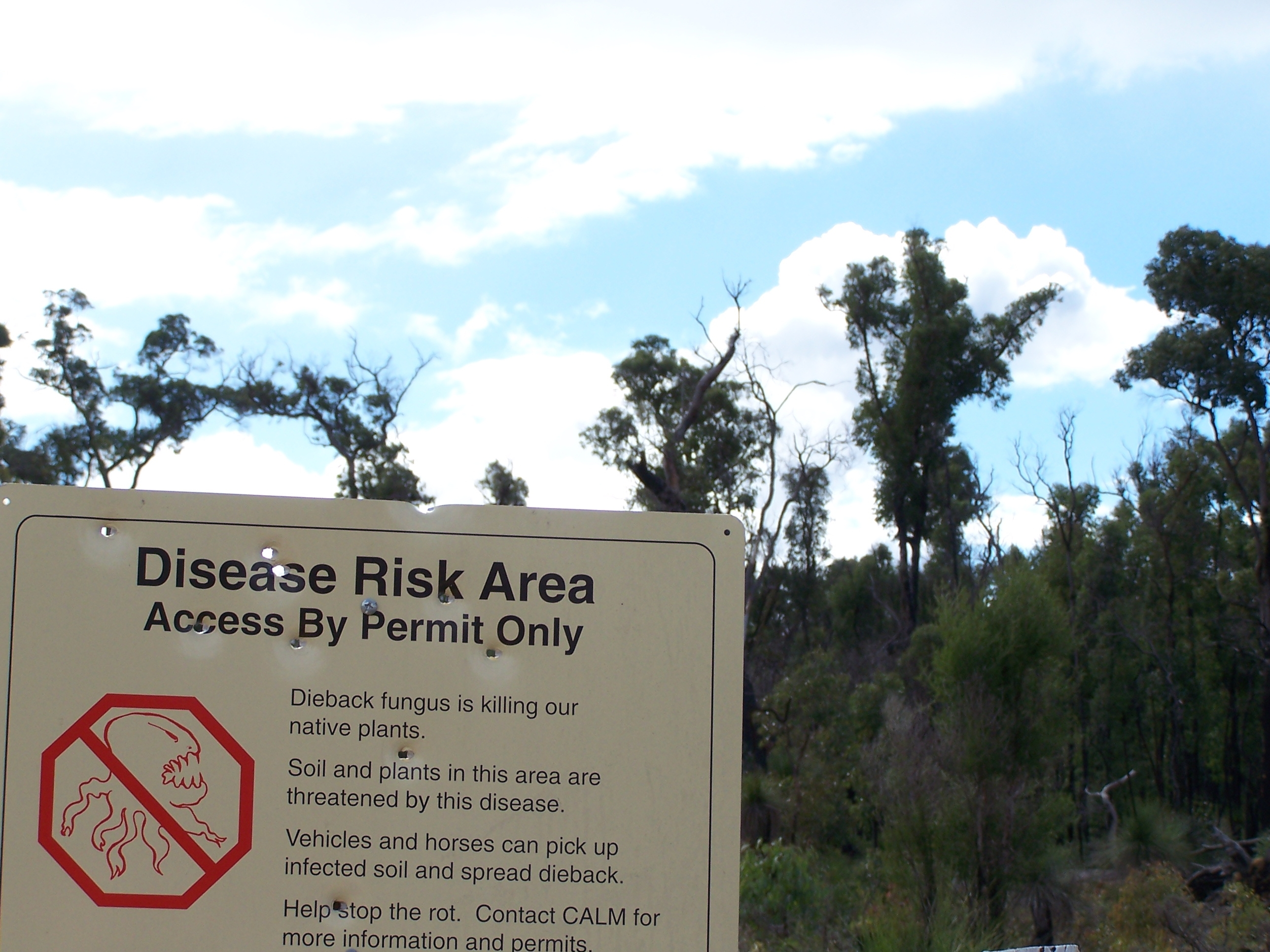
Warning sign near Mount Dale, Western Australia advising to keep vehicles out of dieback affected areas to prevent the spread of this fungus.

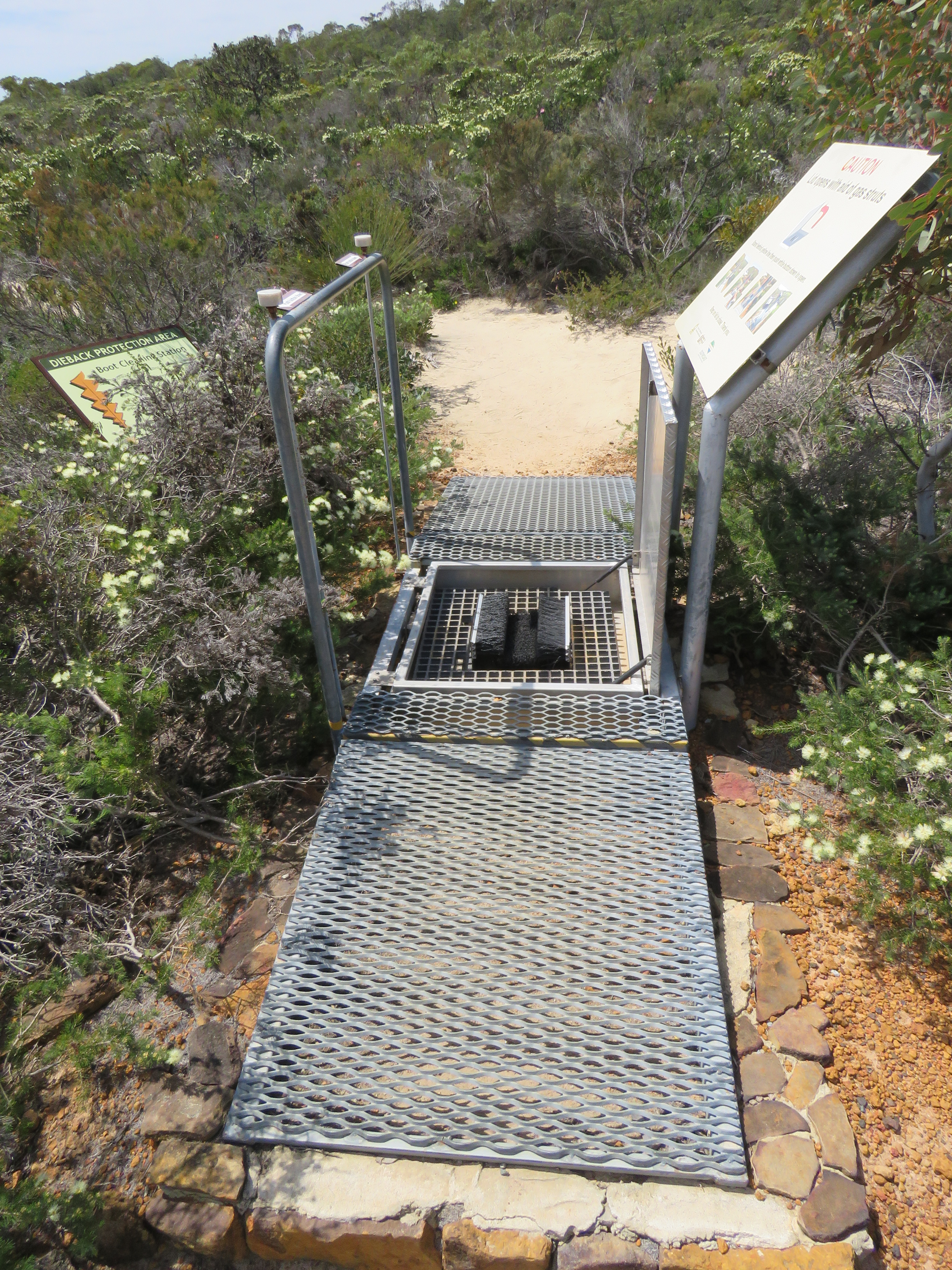
A boot cleaning station in Lesueur National Park designed to limit the spread of dieback

No treatment has been found to eradicate P. cinnamomi, although an integrated approach can control the spread and impact of the disease.

Gardening practices to restrict spread include restricting soil or water movement from infected areas by using clean bins and equipment, installing watertight drains to prevent surface run off, and working last in diseased areas after harvesting healthy areas first.

Planting in raised beds promotes rapid drainage and reduces prolonged contact of plant roots with water, making the soil environment less hospitable to P. cinnamomi. For specific plants such as young avocado plants, soil solarisation by using clear polythene sheets laid on the soil surface to trap radiant heat from the sun can reduce spread, and an integrated approach is generally taken to control disease on avocado.

Chemical means of control include fumigation and the use of phosphonate fungistats. Fumigation prior to planting may be effective on some life stages of P. cinnamomi, but does not eliminate chlamydospores as they are present deeper in the soil where fumigation may not reach. However, fumigation can potentially worsen disease by reducing the population of competing soil microorganisms, and P. cinnamomi is often able to re-invade fumigated soil.

Phosphonate fungistats can improve the ability of a tree to tolerate, resist, or recover from infection. Phosphite administered through direct foliage sprays, aerial application by aircraft or direct injection has been used to limit the disease with some success and has been recognized as a major strategy for disease prevention.

Commonly potassium phosphite is used as a biodegradable fungicide, and calcium or magnesium phosphite may also be used. Overuse of phosphite may harm the treated plant, especially when the plant is phosphate deficient.

== See also ==
- Chlorosis
- Forest pathology
