= Stacking (chemistry) =

Attractive interactions between aromatic rings

In chemistry, stacking refers to superposition of molecules or atomic sheets owing to attractive interactions between these molecules or sheets.

== Metal dichalcogenide compounds ==
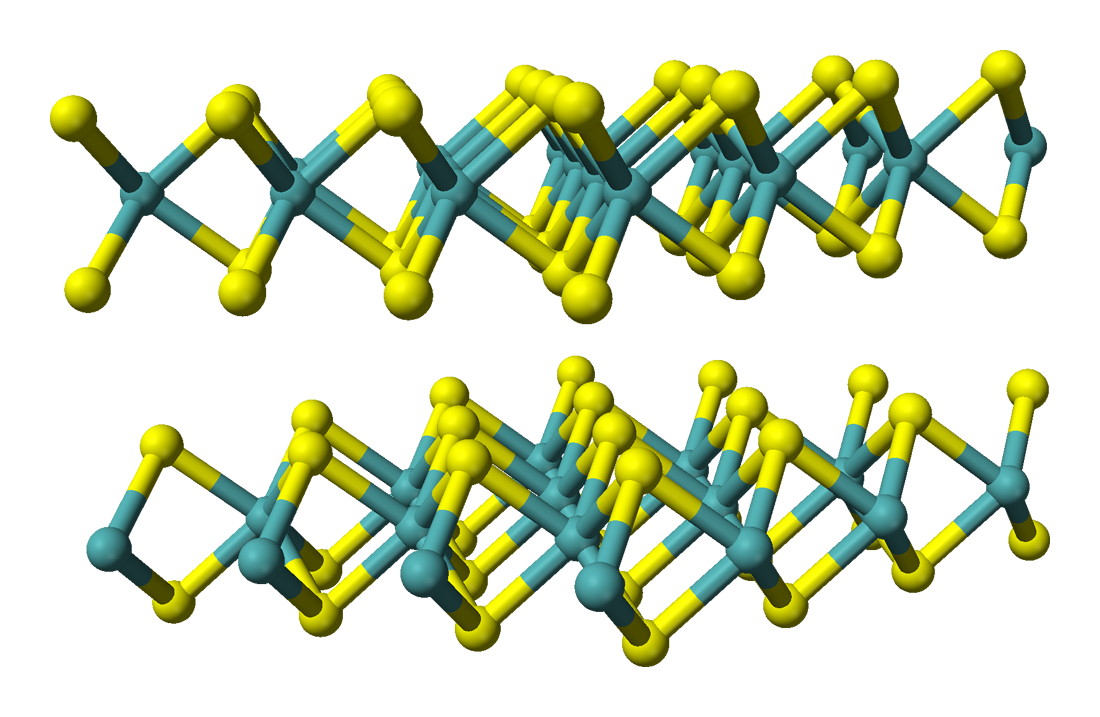
MoS_{2}, the most common metal dichalcogenide, adopts a layered structure.

Metal dichalcogenides have the formula ME_{2}, where M = a transition metal and E = S, Se, Te. In terms of their electronic structures, these compounds are usually viewed as derivatives of M^{4+}. They adopt stacked structures, which is relevant to their ability to undergo intercalation, e.g. by lithium, and their lubricating properties. The corresponding diselenides and even ditellurides are known, e.g., TiSe_{2}, MoSe_{2}, and WSe_{2}.

== Charge transfer salts ==
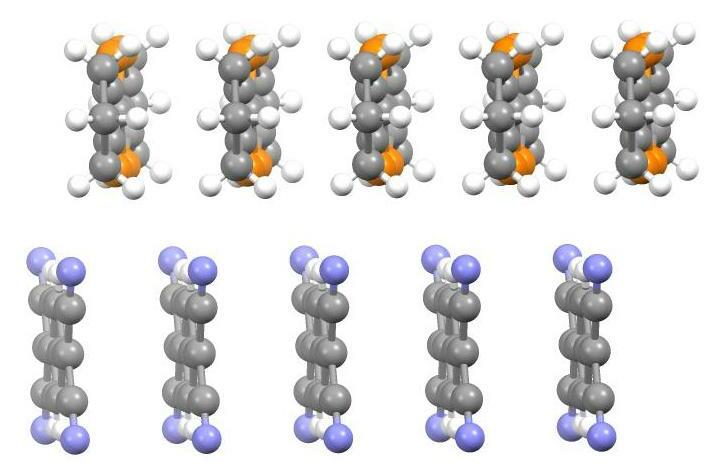
Edge-on view of portion of crystal structure of hexamethyleneTTF/TCNQ charge transfer salt, highlighting the segregated stacking.

A combination of tetracyanoquinodimethane (TCNQ) and tetrathiafulvalene (TTF) forms a strong charge-transfer complex referred to as TTF-TCNQ. The solid shows almost metallic electrical conductance. In a TTF-TCNQ crystal, TTF and TCNQ molecules are arranged independently in separate parallel-aligned stacks, and an electron transfer occurs from donor (TTF) to acceptor (TCNQ) stacks.

== Graphite ==
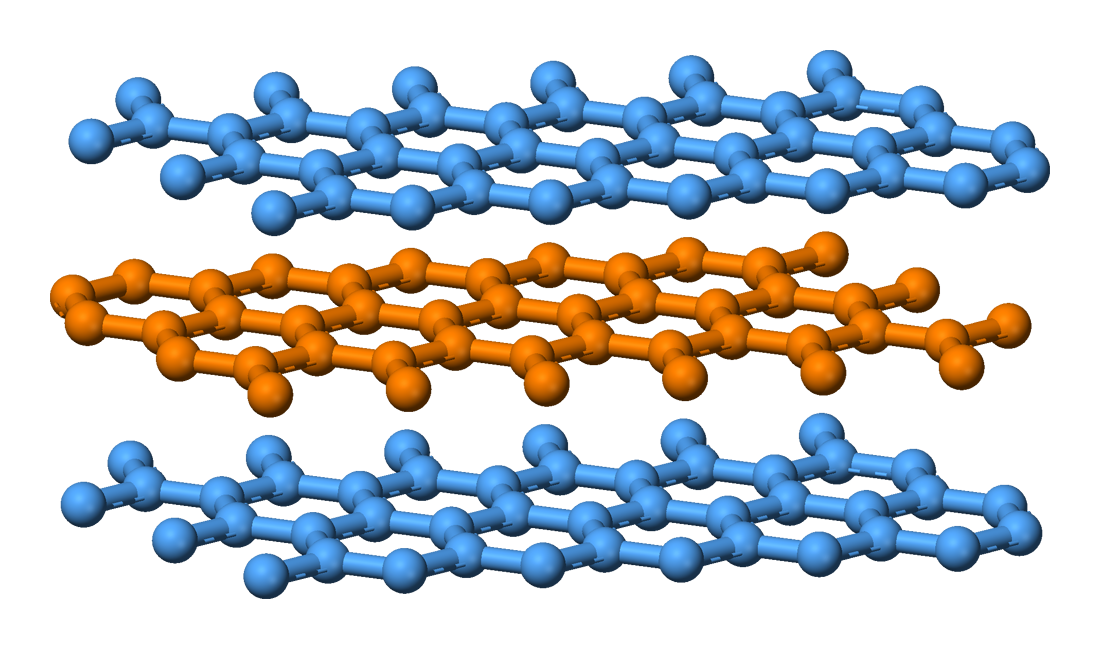
Side view of ABA layer stacking in graphite

Graphite consists of stacked sheets of covalently bonded carbon. The individual layers are called graphene. In each layer, each carbon atom is bonded to three other atoms forming a continuous layer of sp^{2} bonded carbon hexagons, like a honeycomb lattice with a bond length of 0.142 nm, and the distance between planes is 0.335 nm. Bonding between layers is relatively weak van der Waals bonds, which allows the graphene-like layers to be easily separated and to glide past each other. Electrical conductivity perpendicular to the layers is consequently about 1000 times lower.

== Linear chain compounds ==
Linear chain compounds are materials composed of stacked arrays of metal-metal bonded molecules or ions. Such materials exhibit anisotropic electrical conductivity. One example is Rh(acac)(CO)_{2} (acac = acetylacetonate, which stack with Rh···Rh distances of about 326 pm. Classic examples include Krogmann's salt and Magnus's green salt.

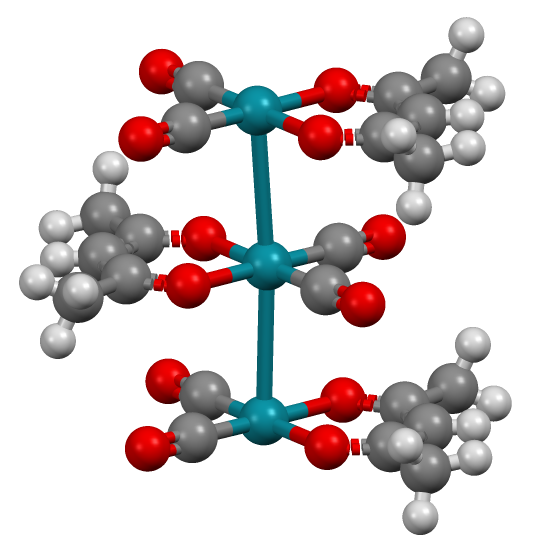
Portion of the lattice of Dicarbonyl(acetylacetonato)rhodium(I) (Rh(acac)(CO)_{2}) showing the "stacking" of the individual planar units through Rh···Rh interactions.

== Counterexample: benzene dimer and related species ==
π–π stacking is a noncovalent interaction between the pi bonds of aromatic rings. Such "sandwich interactions" are however generally electrostatically repulsive. What is more commonly observed are either a staggered stacking (parallel displaced) or pi-teeing (perpendicular T-shaped) interaction both of which are electrostatic attractive. For example, the most commonly observed interactions between aromatic rings of amino acid residues in proteins is a staggered stacked followed by a perpendicular orientation. Sandwiched orientations are relatively rare. Pi stacking is repulsive as it places carbon atoms with partial negative charges from one ring on top of other partial negatively charged carbon atoms from the second ring and hydrogen atoms with partial positive charges on top of other hydrogen atoms that likewise carry partial positive charges.

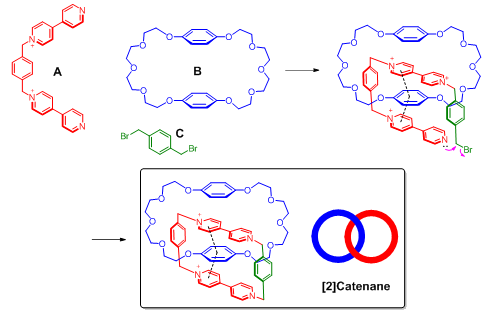
The synthesis of catenane exploiting attractive pi-stacking interactions between electron-rich and electron-poor arenes.

π–π interactions play a role in supramolecular chemistry, specifically the synthesis of catenane. The major challenge for the synthesis of catenane is to interlock molecules in a controlled fashion. Attractive π–π interactions exist between electron-rich benzene derivatives and electron-poor pyridinium rings. [2]Catanene was synthesized by treating bis(pyridinium) (A), bisparaphenylene-34-crown-10 (B), and 1, 4-bis(bromomethyl)benzene (C) (Fig. 2). The π–π interaction between A and B directed the formation of an interlocked template intermediate that was further cyclized by substitution reaction with compound C to generate the [2]catenane product.

== See also ==
- Noncovalent interaction
- Dispersion (chemistry)
- Cation–pi interaction
- Intercalation (biochemistry)
- Intercalation (chemistry)
