= Fluorophosphite =

Identifiers
3D model (JSmol)	Interactive image
ChemSpider	11194962
- InChI: InChI=1S/FH2O2P/c1-4(2)3/h4H,(H,2,3)/p-1 Key: ICZWVCDXVPRBMM-UHFFFAOYSA-M
- SMILES: [O-][PH](=O)F

Properties
Chemical formula	HO_{2}P^{−}
Molar mass	63.980 g·mol^{−1}

Related compounds
Related compounds	Phosphite; Monofluorophosphate; Difluorophosphate
- Except where otherwise noted, data are given for materials in their standard state (at 25 °C [77 °F], 100 kPa). Infobox references

Fluorophosphite is an ion with formula HPO_{2}F^{−}. The term is also used for salts contain the fluorophosphite anion.

The conjugate acid is phosphorofluoridous acid, (fluorophosphinic acid or monoflorophosphorous acid), H[PHO_{2}F].

== Production ==
One way to produce is to react phosphonic acid with a fluoride salt in molten urea. This works with potassium and ammonium salts.

H_{3}PO_{3} + O=C(NH_{2})_{2} + MF → M[PHO_{2}F] + 2NH_{3} + CO_{2}

Pyrophosphite is hydrolysed in a solution containing fluoride ions to fluorophosphite.

[H_{2}P_{2}O_{5}]^{2−} + HF → [HPO_{2}F]^{−} + [H_{2}PO_{2}]^{−}

Phosphorus trifluoride combines with a dilute alkali bicarbonate solution to yield fluorophosphite.

A combination of hydrofluoric acid and monopotassium phosphite results in a solvated compound that is not a fluorophospite. Grinding potassium fluoride with phosphorous acid results in the same substance. It has formula KHPHO_{3}•HF. When heated this produces some potassium fluorophosphite, along with potassium pyrophosphite.

KHPHO_{3}•HF → KPFHO_{2} + H_{2}O ↑

Lithium monofluorophosphite has been made from HF, phosphorus trichloride (PCl_{3}) and lithium chloride, using ether as a solvent.

== Reactions ==
Fluorophosphite is hydrolysed by water to form more phosphite and hydrofluoric acid again. In neutral conditions, the concentration will of fluorophosphite will be similar to phosphite.

Fluorophosphite reacts with phosphate to yield a complex anion mixing P^{III} and P^{VI}.

PO_{2}H_{2}F + H_{3}PO_{4} ↔ HF + HP(O)(OH)OP(O)(OH)_{2}

== List ==
formula	reference
LiPFHO_{2}	
NH_{4}PFHO_{2}	
KPFHO_{2}	
