= Robert Delafield Rands =

Robert Delafield Rands (1890–1970) was an American agronomist and mycologist. He served as chief director of Agriculture Office of Rubber Plant Investigations in the United States Department of Agriculture.

== Biography ==
Rands was born in 1890. His Ph.D. thesis at the University of Wisconsin was in the field of plant pathology. In research in Indonesia, he showed that "brown bast" in Hevea species was a result of phloem necrosis due to tapping of the trees for latex. Rands met Minnie Frost, then a graduate student at the University of Chicago, in a field trip to the Rocky Mountains of Colorado. A year later they married in Frost's home town of Louisville, Kentucky on December 25, 1914. Minnie Frost Rands wrote a book about her experiences in the places the couple traveled to.

After returning to the United States, Rands worked for the United States Department of Agriculture into diseases of sugar cane, and then at the beginning of World War II returned to study of rubber plants. He later became head of Rubber Investigations Office. On his retirement in 1954, he moved to Lake Wales, Florida and acted as a consultant for the then B. F Goodrich Company's establishment of rubber plantations in the Philippines and Africa.

Rands was a fellow of the American Association for the Advancement of Science, the American Phytopathological Society, and the Washington Academy of Sciences. He was a member of the Sigma Xi honor society. Rands died 10 December 1970 in Lake Wales. In an obituary he was described as a leading authority on diseases of sugar cane and rubber plants.

== Works ==
=== Journal articles ===
- Rands, RD. 1922. Streepkanker van Kaneel veroorzaakt door Phytophthora cinnamomi n.sp. Comunicaciones del Instituto Vegetales. Buitenzorg 54: 1–53
- ----. 1924. South American Leaf Disease of Para Rubber. USDA Bulletin 1286. Washington, DC
- ----. 1928. Sugar-cane variety tests in Louisiana during the crop year 1926-27 Circular USDA 15 pp.
- Stevenson, JA; RD Rands. 1938. An annotated list of fungi and bacteria associated with sugar cane and its products. Hawaiian Planters' Record 42 (4): 247–313

=== Books ===
- Rands, RD; E Dopp. 1938. Pythium root rot of sugarcane. Technical bulletin (USDA) : 666. 96 pp.
- ----. 1967. Genealogy of the Rands family and records on allied families Winn, Turner, Connelly, McCollum, Parsons, Baylor, Boone, and Bryan. vi + 78 pp.

== Species described ==
- Phytophthora cinnamomi
