= Disodium hydrogen phosphite =

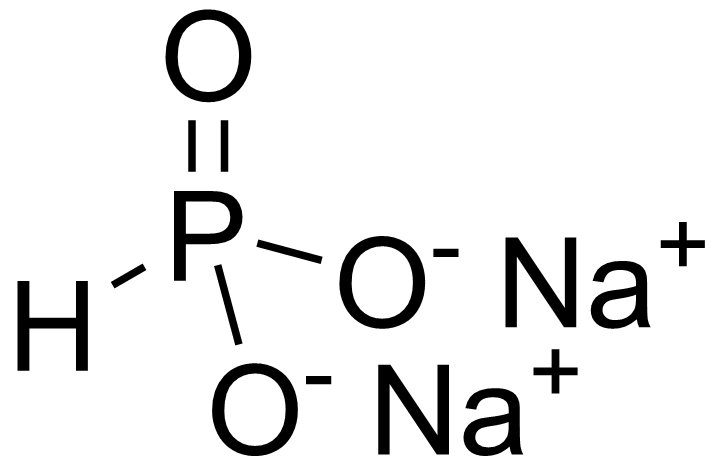

Names
- IUPAC name sodium phosphonate pentahydrate
- Other names Sodium phosphate dibasic pentahydrate, sodium phosphite

Identifiers
CAS Number	anhydrous: 13708-85-5; pentahydrate: 13517-23-2
3D model (JSmol)	Interactive image; anhydrous: Interactive image
ChemSpider	21106436
ECHA InfoCard	100.033.848
PubChem CID	anhydrous: 16211071; pentahydrate: 22463763
UNII	anhydrous: X65D416703; pentahydrate: UM5UZ43YVE
CompTox Dashboard (EPA)	DTXSID20889617
- InChI: InChI=1S/2Na.O3P/c;;1-4(2)3/q2*+1;-3/p+1 Key: XWGAABYWOLJBFF-UHFFFAOYSA-O; InChI=1/2Na.O3P/c;;1-4(2)3/q2*+1;-3/p+1 Key: XWGAABYWOLJBFF-IKLDFBCSAK
- SMILES: O=P([O-])([O-])[H].[Na+].[Na+]; anhydrous: [H+].[Na+].[Na+].[O-]P([O-])[O-]

Properties
Chemical formula	HNa_{2}O_{3}P
Molar mass	125.958 g·mol^{−1}
Appearance	white solid
- Except where otherwise noted, data are given for materials in their standard state (at 25 °C [77 °F], 100 kPa). verify (what is ?) Infobox references

Disodium hydrogen phosphite is the name for inorganic compounds with the formula Na_{2}HPO_{3}•(H_{2}O)_{x}. The commonly encountered salt is the pentahydrate. A derivative of phosphorous acid (HP(O)(OH)_{2}), it contains the anion HPO_{3}^{2−}. Its common name suggests that it contains an acidic hydrogen atom, as in sodium hydrogen carbonate. However, this name is misleading as the hydrogen atom is not acidic, being bonded to phosphorus rather than oxygen. The salt has reducing properties. It is white or colorless solid, and is little studied.
