= Monopotassium phosphite =

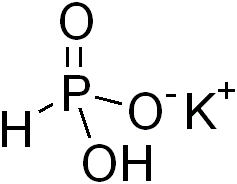

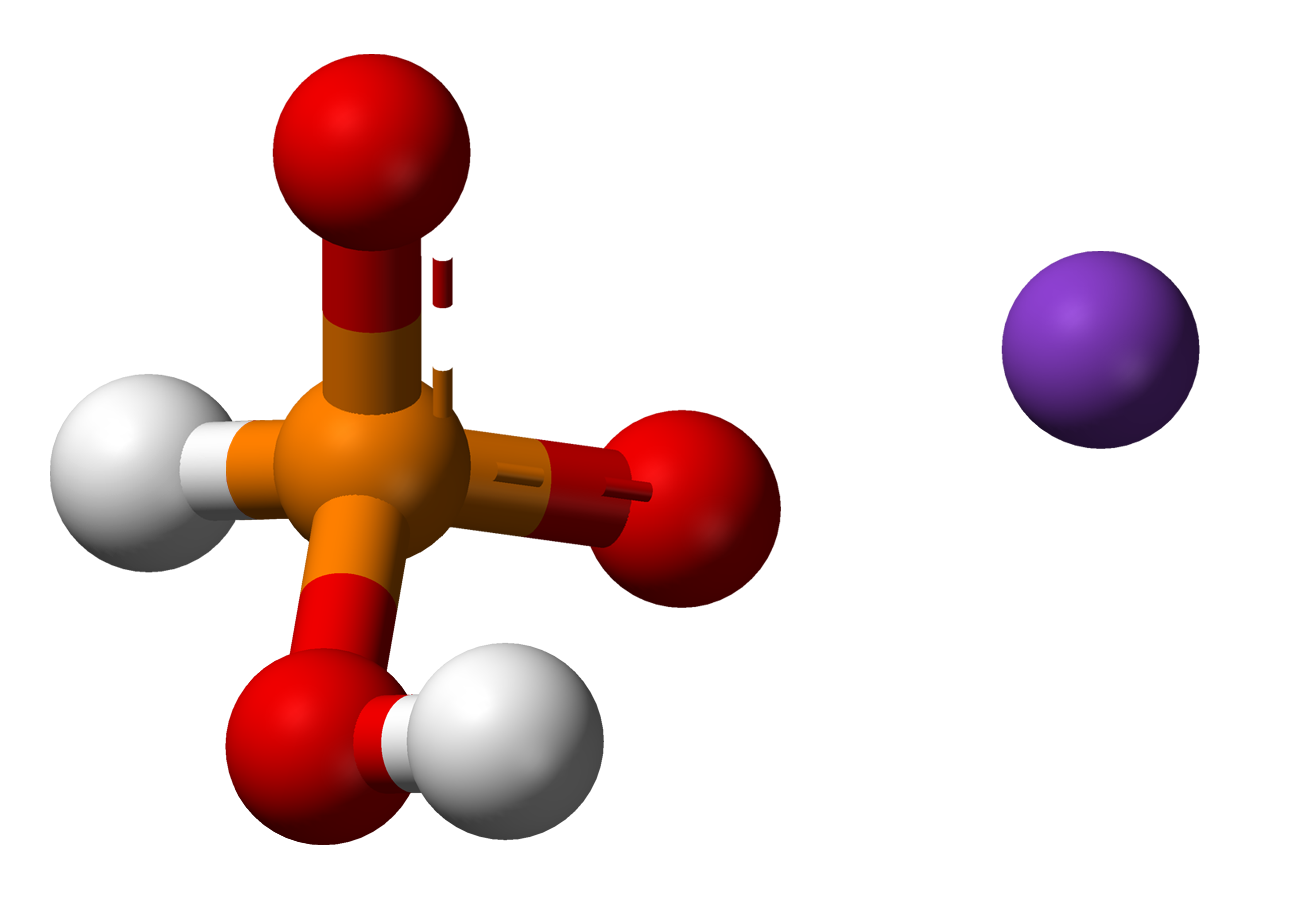
Ball-and-stick model of the component ions

Names
- IUPAC name Potassium hydrogen phosphonate
- Other names Potassium dihydrogen phosphite; Mono potassium phosphite; Monopotassium dihydrogen phosphite; Potassium phosphite monobasic

Identifiers
| CAS Number | 13977-65-6 |
| 3D model (JSmol) | Interactive image |
| Beilstein Reference | 11343658 |
| ChemSpider | 8488591 |
| ECHA InfoCard | 100.116.175 |
| EC Number | 604-162-9 |
| PubChem CID | 23701737 |
| UNII | 59RSS63D8J |
| CompTox Dashboard (EPA) | DTXSID20884521 |
- InChI: InChI=1S/K.H2O3P/c;1-4(2)3/h;1-2H/q+1;-1 Key: BZHCGFBZBPVRFE-UHFFFAOYSA-N
- SMILES: OP(O)[O-].[K+]

Properties
| Chemical formula | H_{2}KO_{3}P |
| Molar mass | 120.085 g·mol^{−1} |
| Appearance | white crystals |
| Density | 2.14 g/cm^{3} |
| Solubility in water | 2200 g/L |
| Solubility | soluble in ethanol |

Structure
| Crystal structure | monoclinic |
- Except where otherwise noted, data are given for materials in their standard state (at 25 °C [77 °F], 100 kPa). verify (what is ?) Infobox references

Monopotassium phosphite is an inorganic compound with the formula KH_{2}PO_{3}. A compositionally related compound has the formula H_{3}PO_{3}^{.}2(KH_{2}PO_{3}). Both are white solids that consist of salts of the phosphite anion H_{2}PO_{3}^{−}, the conjugate base of phosphorous acid.

Phosphites of potassium are used as fungicides (in a loose sense) in agriculture to combat water mold infection. Confusingly, they have also been marketed as fertilizers to avoid a regulatory burden. While perfectly capable to supply potassium to the plant, the phosphorus in phosphite form is unavailable to plants, and may even inhibit the uptake of the normal phosphate form if used in excess.
