= Krogmann's salt =

Names
- IUPAC name Dipotassium tetracyanoplatinate bromide trihydrate
- Other names Potassium tetracyanoplatinate bromide trihydrate

Identifiers
3D model (JSmol)	Interactive image
- InChI: InChI=1S/40CN.3BrH.20K.26H2O.10Pt/c40*1-2;;;;;;;;;;;;;;;;;;;;;;;;;;;;;;;;;;;;;;;;;;;;;;;;;;;;;;;;;;;/h;;;;;;;;;;;;;;;;;;;;;;;;;;;;;;;;;;;;;;;;3*1H;;;;;;;;;;;;;;;;;;;;;26*1H2;;;;;;;;;;/ Key: WXALQRYYHQEGFS-UHFFFAOYSA-Kq;;;;;;;;;;;;;;;;;;;;;;;;;;;;;;;;;;;;;;;;;;;20*+1;;;;;;;;;;;;;;;;;;;;;;;;;;;7*-2;3*-1/p-3
- SMILES: [K+].[K+].[K+].[K+].[K+].[K+].[K+].[K+].[K+].[K+].[K+].[K+].[K+].[K+].[K+].[K+].[K+].[K+].[K+].[K+].N#C[Pt-2](C#N)(C#N)C#N.N#C[Pt-2](C#N)(C#N)C#N.N#C[Pt-2](C#N)(C#N)C#N.N#C[Pt-2](C#N)(C#N)C#N.N#C[Pt-2](C#N)(C#N)C#N.N#C[Pt-2](C#N)(C#N)C#N.N#C[Pt-2](C#N)(C#N)C#N.N#C[Pt-](C#N)(C#N)C#N.N#C[Pt-](C#N)(C#N)C#N.N#C[Pt-](C#N)(C#N)C#N.[Br-].[Br-].[Br-].O.O.O.O.O.O.O.O.O.O.O.O.O.O.O.O.O.O.O.O.O.O.O.O.O.O

Properties
Chemical formula	K_{2}Pt(CN)_{4}Br_{0.3}
Molar mass	401.3227 g/mol
Appearance	Copper-colored crystalline solid

Structure
Crystal structure	Tetragonal
Space group	99 (P4mm)
Lattice constant	a = 9.91 Å, c = 5.78 Å
Coordination geometry	Square planar
- Except where otherwise noted, data are given for materials in their standard state (at 25 °C [77 °F], 100 kPa). verify (what is ?) Infobox references

Krogmann's salt is a linear chain compound consisting of stacks of tetracyanoplatinate. Sometimes described as molecular wires, Krogmann's salt exhibits highly anisotropic electrical conductivity. For this reason, Krogmann's salt and related materials are of some interest in nanotechnology.

== History and nomenclature ==
Krogmann's salt was first synthesized by Klaus Krogmann in the late 1960s.

Krogmann's salt most commonly refers to a platinum metal complex of the formula K_{2}[Pt(CN)_{4}X_{0.3}] where X is usually bromine (or sometimes chlorine). Many other non-stoichiometric metal salts containing the anionic complex [Pt(CN)_{4}]^{n−} can also be characterized.

== Structure and physical properties ==
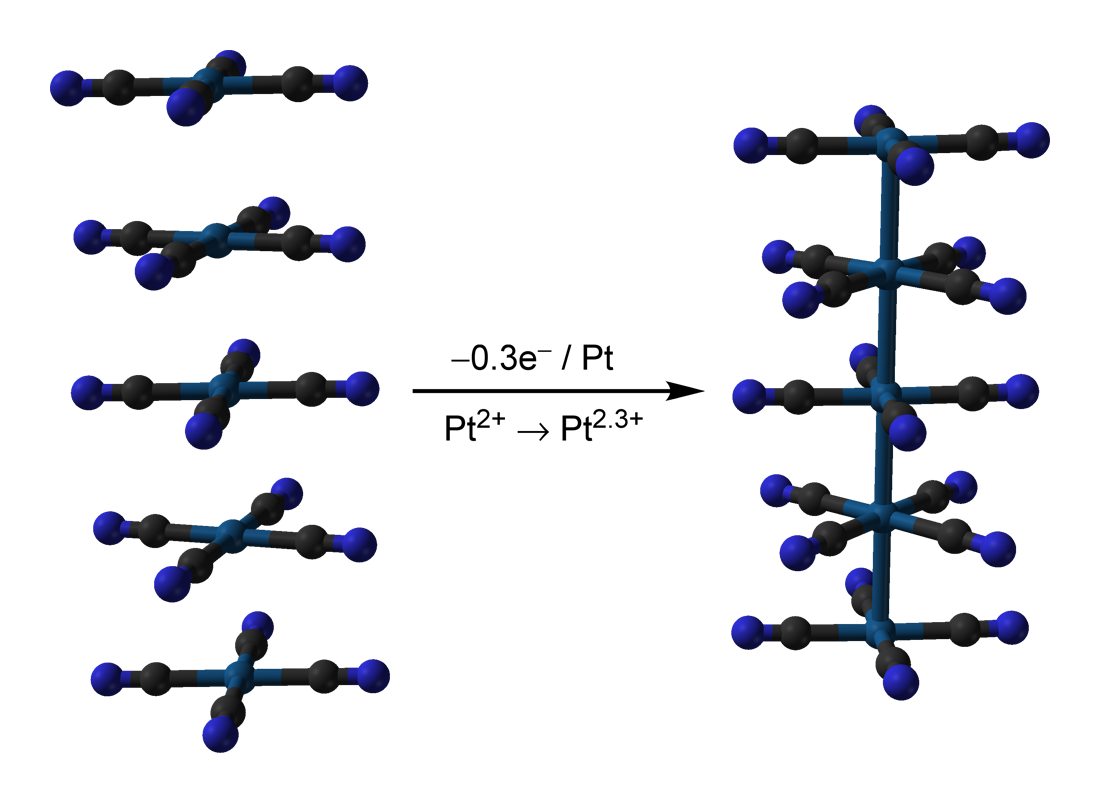
n[Pt(CN)_{4}]^{2−} → ([Pt(CN)_{4}]^{1.7−})_{n}

Krogmann's salt is a series of partially oxidized tetracyanoplatinate complexes linked by the platinum-platinum bonds on the top and bottom faces of the planar [Pt(CN)_{4}]^{n−} anions. This salt forms infinite stacks in the solid state based on the overlap of the d_{z2} orbitals.

Krogmann's salt has a tetragonal crystal structure with a Pt−Pt distance of 2.880 angstroms, which is much shorter than the metal-metal bond distances in other planar platinum complexes such as Ca[Pt(CN)_{4}]·5H_{2}O (3.36 angstroms), Sr[Pt(CN)_{4}]·5H_{2}O (3.58 angstroms), and Mg[Pt(CN)_{4}]·7H_{2}O (3.16 angstroms). The Pt−Pt distance in Krogmann's salt is only 0.1 angstroms longer than in platinum metal.

Each unit cell contains a site for Cl^{−}, corresponding to 0.5 Cl^{−} per Pt. However, this site is only filled 64% of the time, giving 0.32 Cl^{−} per Pt in the actual compound. Because of this, the oxidation number of Pt does not rise above +2.32.

Krogmann's salt has no recognizable phase range and is characterized by broad and intense intervalence bands in its electronic spectra.

== Chemical properties ==
One of the most widely researched properties of Krogmann's salt is its unusual electric conductance. Because of its linear chain structure and overlap of the platinum $d_{z^2}$ orbitals, Krogmann's salt is an excellent conductor of electricity. This property makes it an attractive material for nanotechnology.

== Preparation ==
The usual preparation of Krogmann's salt involves the evaporation of a 5:1 molar ratio mixture of the salts K_{2}[Pt(CN)_{4}] and K_{2}[Pt(CN)_{4}Br_{2}] in water to give copper-colored needles of K_{2}[Pt(CN)_{4}]Br_{0.32}·2.6 H_{2}O.

5K_{2}[Pt(CN)_{4}] + K_{2}[Pt(CN)_{4}Br_{2}] + 15.6 H_{2}O → 6K_{2}[Pt(CN)_{4}]Br_{0.32}·2.6 H_{2}O

Because excess Pt^{II} or Pt^{IV} complex crystallizes out with the product when the reactant ratio is changed, the product is therefore well defined, although non-stoichiometric.

== Uses ==
Krogmann's salt nor any related material has found any commercial applications.
