= Linear chain compound =

Materials made of one-dimensional arrays of metal-metal bonded molecules

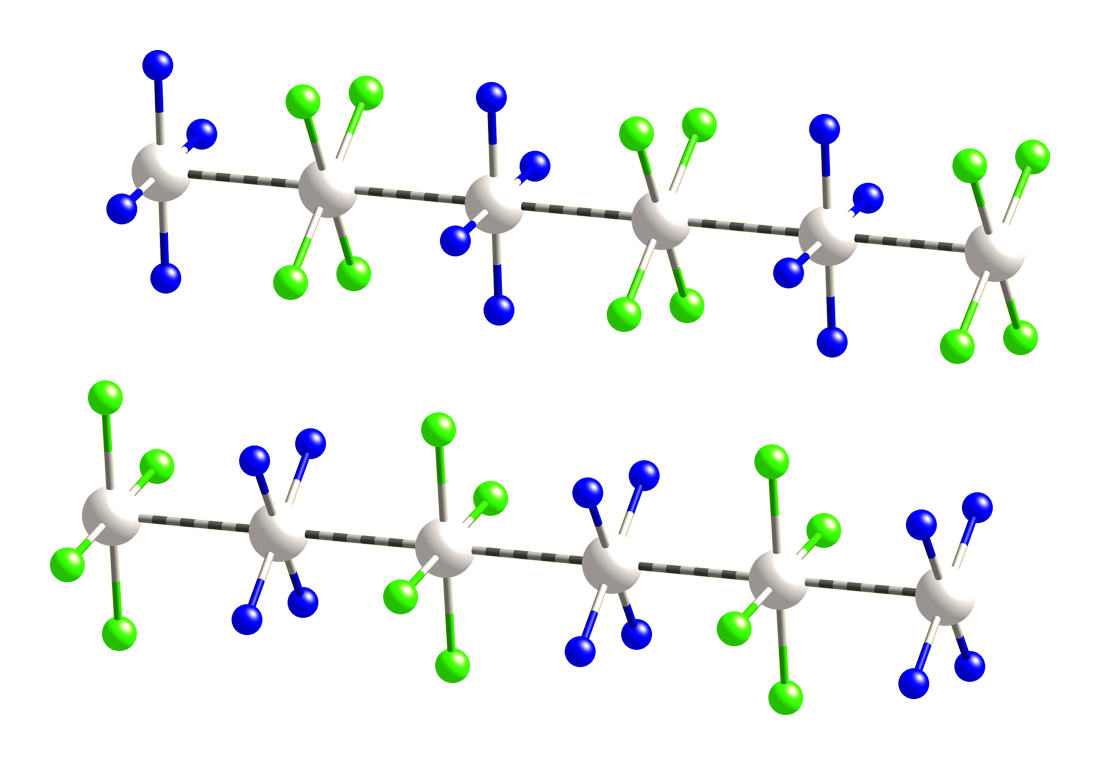
Magnus's green salt is an example of a linear chain compound.

In chemistry and materials science, linear chain compounds are materials composed of one-dimensional arrays of metal-metal bonded molecules or ions. Such materials exhibit anisotropic electrical conductivity.

== Examples ==
Many linear chain compounds feature square planar complexes. One example is Rh(acac)(CO)_{2}, which stack with Rh···Rh distances of about 326 pm. Classic examples include Krogmann's salt and Magnus's green salt. Another example is the partially oxidized derivatives of [Pt(oxalate)_{2}]^{2−}. The otherwise ordinary complex IrBr(CO)_{3} gives an electrically conductive derivative upon oxidation, e.g., with bromine to give IrBr_{1+x}(CO)_{3−x}, where x ~0.05. Related chlorides have the formulae IrCl_{1+x}(CO)_{3} and K_{0.6}Ir(CO)_{2}Cl_{2}·½H_{2}O.

In contrast to linear chain compounds, extended metal atom chains (EMACs) are molecules or ions that consist of a finite, often short, linear strings of metal atoms, surrounded by organic ligands.

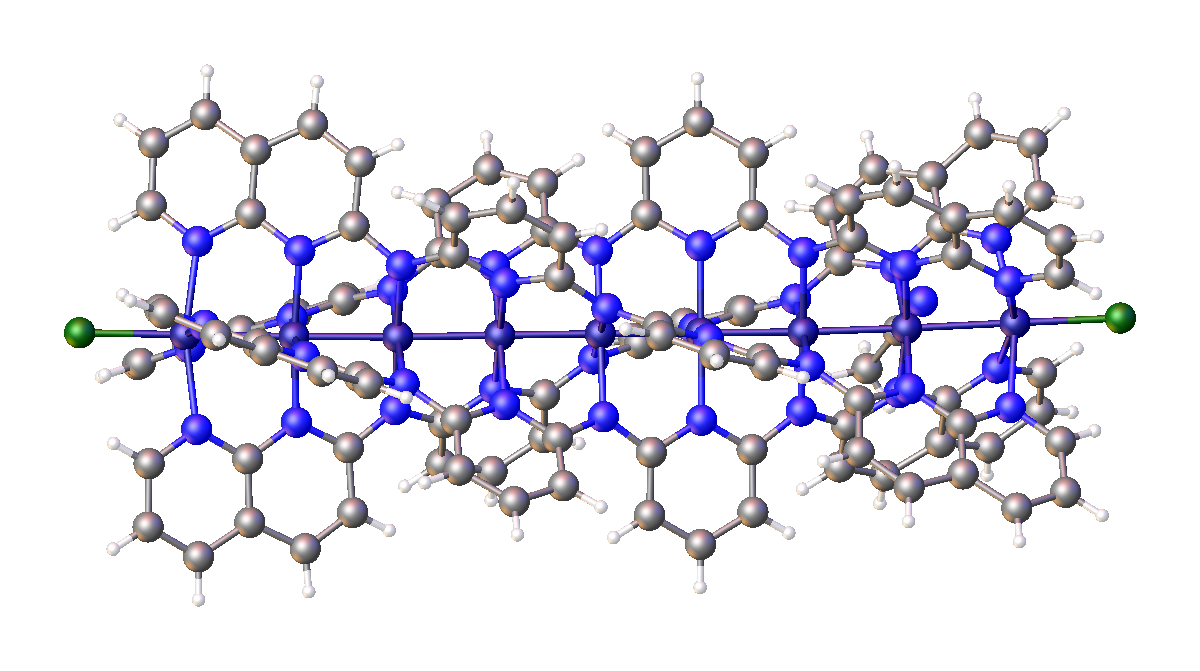
An Ni_{9} EMAC.

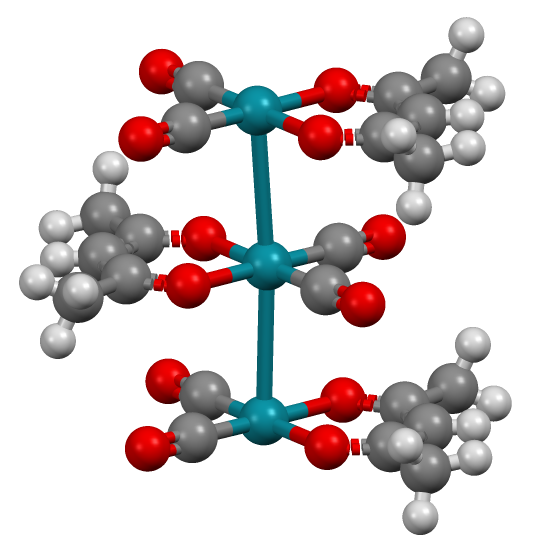
Portion of the lattice of Dicarbonyl(acetylacetonato)rhodium(I) (Rh(acac)(CO)_{2}) showing the "stacking" of the individual planar units through Rh···Rh interactions.

One group of platinum chains is based on alternating cations and anions of [Pt(CNR)_{4}]^{2+} (R = iPr, c-C_{12}H_{23}, p-(C_{2}H_{5})C_{6}H_{4}) and [Pt(CN)_{4}]^{2−}. These may be able to be used as vapochromic sensor materials, or materials which change color when exposed to different vapors.

Linear chains of Pd-Pd bonds protected by a "π-electron sheath" are known.

Not only do these olefin-stabilized metal chains constitute a significant contribution to the field of organometallic chemistry, both the complex's metal atom structures and the olefin ligands themselves can conduct a current.

== Methodology ==
Some linear chain compounds are produced or fabricated by electrocrystallization. The technique is used to obtain single crystals of low-dimensional electrical conductors.

== See also ==
- platinum pop
