= Potassium diplatinum(II) tetrakispyrophosphite =

Names
- Other names platinum pop

Identifiers
CAS Number	80011-26-3
3D model (JSmol)	Interactive image
- InChI: InChI=1S/4K.4O5P2.2H2O.2Pt/c;;;;4*1-6(2)5-7(3)4;;;;/h;;;;;;;;2*1H2;;/q4*+1;;;;;;;2*-6/p+8 Key: KEWZHLOBJOYCDC-UHFFFAOYSA-V
- SMILES: [K+].[K+].[K+].[K+].[Pt+2]1234[Pt+2]([P-](=O)(O)O[P-](=O)(O)1)([P-](=O)(O)O[P-](=O)(O)2)([P-](=O)(O)O[P-](=O)(O)3)[P-](=O)(O)O[P-](=O)(O)4.O.O

Properties
Chemical formula	H_{8}K_{4}O_{20}P_{8}Pt_{2}
Molar mass	1122.395 g·mol^{−1}
Appearance	yellow solid
- Except where otherwise noted, data are given for materials in their standard state (at 25 °C [77 °F], 100 kPa). Infobox references

Potassium diplatinum(II) tetrakispyrophosphite (abbreviated as [Pt_{2}(pop)_{4}]^{4−}) is the inorganic compound with the formula K_{4}[Pt_{2}(HO_{2}POPO_{2}H)_{4}]. It is a water-soluble yellow salt. The compound has a long-lived, strongly luminescent excited state, with an emission maximum at ~510 nm and a lifetime near 10 μs.

== Structure ==
The anion is an example of the Chinese lantern structure. The two square-planar platinum(II) centers are bridged by four pyrophosphito (HO(O)POP(O)OH^{2-}) ligands. The ligands interact via hydrogen bonds between the POH and P=O group. The Pt---Pt separation is 293 pm for the dihydrate. In the Pt(III) dichloride, the Pt-Pt distance is 270 pm, indicating Pt-Pt bonding.

== Synthesis and reactions ==
The complex is prepared by heating a mixture of potassium tetrachloroplatinate and phosphorous acid:

2 K_{2}PtCl_{4} + 8 H_{3}PO_{3} → K_{4}[Pt_{2}(HO_{2}POPO_{2}H)_{4}] + 8 HCl + 4 H_{2}O

Several quat salt derivatives are known.

The anion reacts with boron trifluoride to give the BF_{2}-capped complex [Pt_{2}(P_{2}PO_{5})_{4}(BF_{2})_{8}]^{4-}.

The compound reacts with halogens to give Pt(III) dimers:

K_{4}[Pt_{2}(HO_{2}POPO_{2}H)_{4} + Cl_{2} → K_{4}[Pt_{2}(HO_{2}POPO_{2}H)_{4}Cl_{2}]

With substoichiometric halogen, linear chain compounds result.
