= Basic lead phosphite =

Names
- Other names basic lead phosphonite

Identifiers
CAS Number	1344-40-7
3D model (JSmol)	Interactive image
PubChem CID	71300865
UN number	2989
- InChI: InChI=1S/2HO3P.H2O.4O.6Pb/c2*1-4(2)3;;;;;;;;;;;/h2*1H;1H2;;;;;;;;;;/q2*-2;;;;;;;;;;2*+2 Key: XTQIDVCLCLXOKX-UHFFFAOYSA-N
- SMILES: O.OP([O-])[O-].OP([O-])[O-].O=[Pb].O=[Pb].O=[Pb].O=[Pb].[Pb+2].[Pb+2]

Properties
Chemical formula	H_{3}O_{6}PPb_{3}
Molar mass	751.6 g·mol^{−1}
Appearance	white solid

Hazards
- GHS labelling
Pictograms	(GHS02: Flammable) (GHS08: Health hazard)
Signal word	Danger
Hazard statements	H228, H350, H360, H370, H372
Precautionary statements	P201, P202, P210, P240, P241, P260, P264, P270, P280, P281, P307+P311, P308+P313, P314, P321, P370+P378, P405, P501
- Except where otherwise noted, data are given for materials in their standard state (at 25 °C [77 °F], 100 kPa). Infobox references

Basic lead phosphite is an inorganic compound with the proposed composition Pb_{3}O(OH)_{2}(HPO_{3}). The compound contains the phosphite anion, which provides the reducing properties associated with the application of this material.

It is widely used as a stabilizer for chlorine-containing polymers, especially polyvinylchloride. Other lead phosphites are known, including normal lead phosphite, PbHPO_{3}, although the basic salt is especially effective.
