= Phosphorous acid =

Chemical compound (H3PO3)

Wireframe model of phosphorous acid
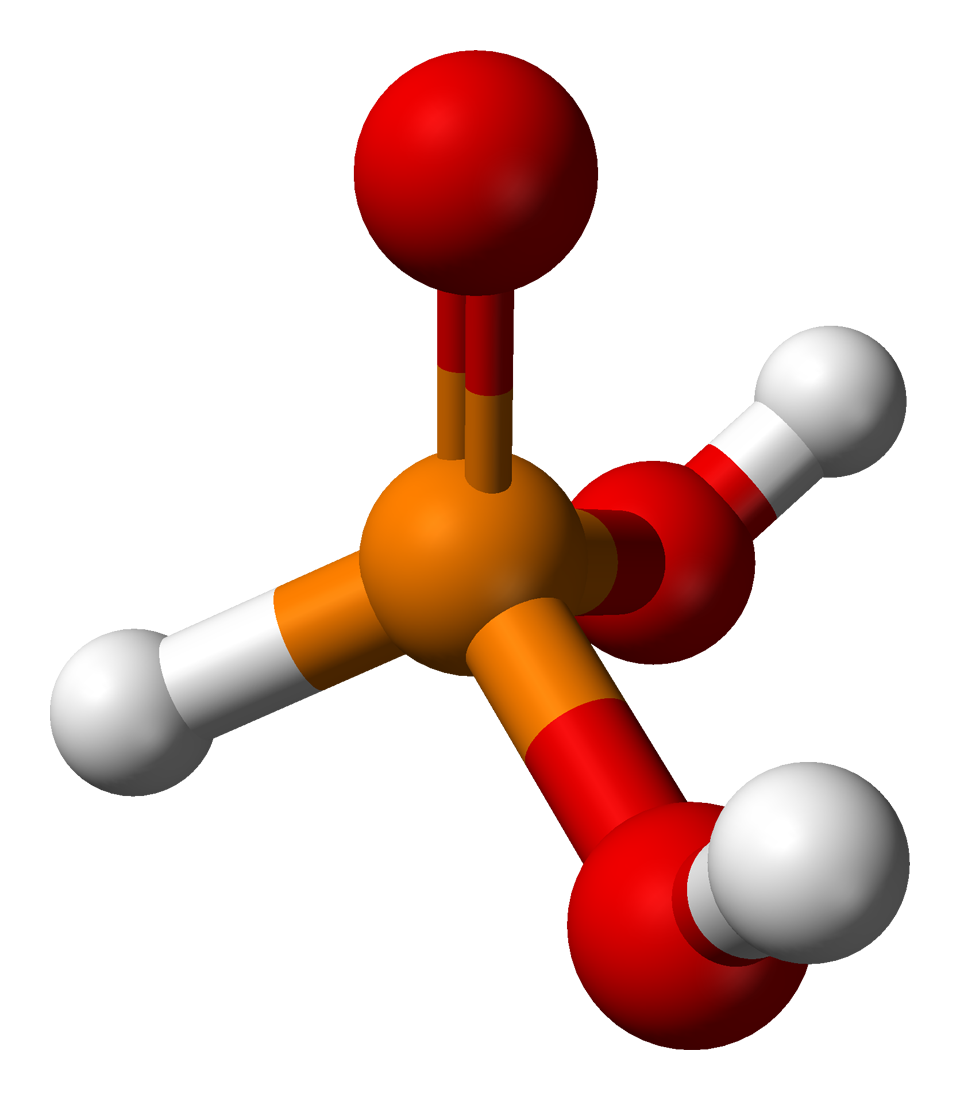
Ball and stick model of phosphorous acid
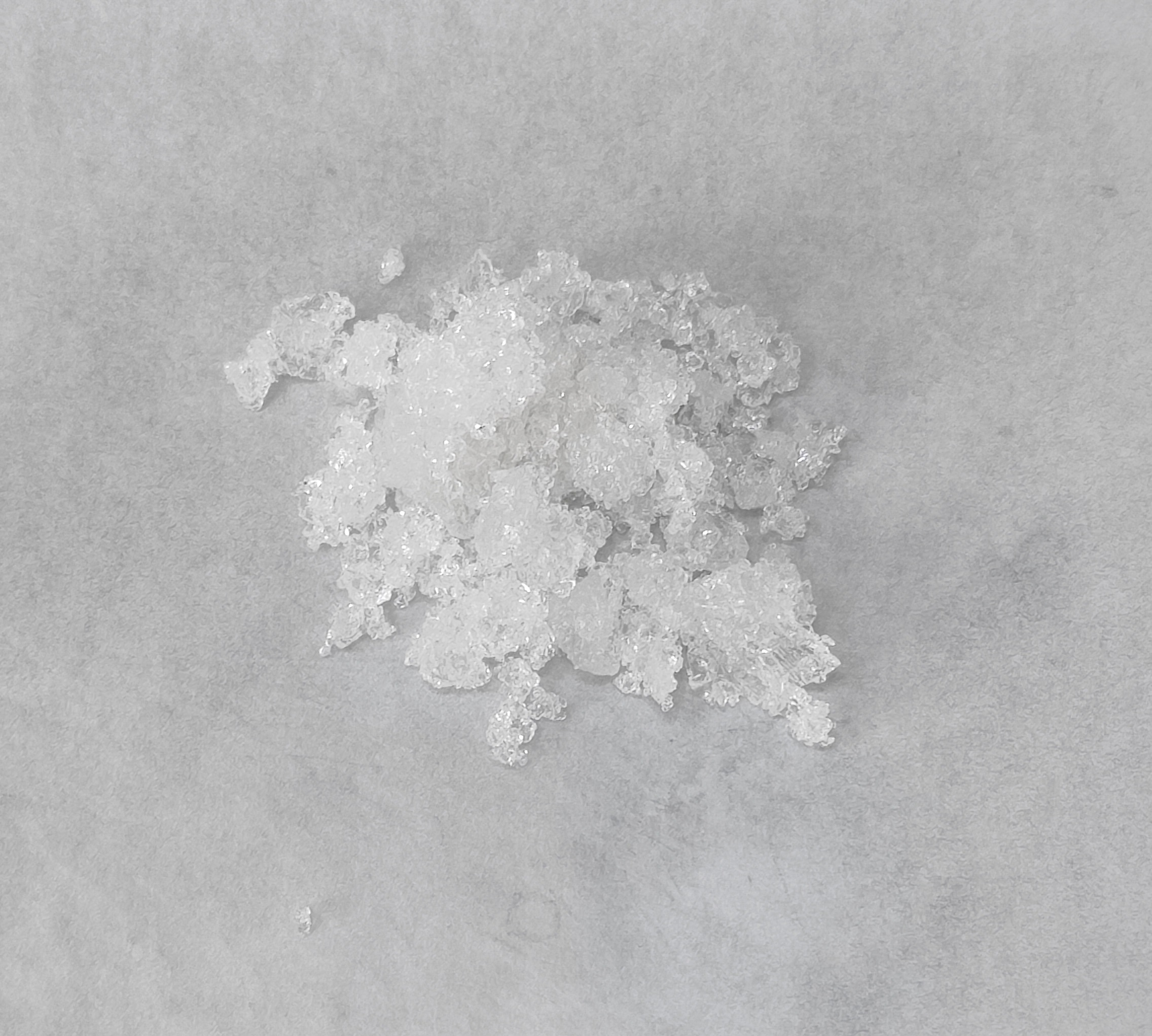

Names
- IUPAC name Phosphonic acid
- Systematic IUPAC name Phosphorous acid
- Other names Dihydroxyphosphine oxide Dihydroxy(oxo)-λ^{5}-phosphane; Dihydroxy-λ^{5}-phosphanone; Orthophosphorous acid Oxo-λ^{5}-phosphanediol; Oxo-λ^{5}-phosphonous acid Metaphosphoroic acid

Identifiers
CAS Number	13598-36-2
3D model (JSmol)	HP(O)(OH)_{2}: Interactive image; P(OH)_{3}: Interactive image
ChEBI	CHEBI:44976
ChEMBL	ChEMBL1235291
ChemSpider	10449259
ECHA InfoCard	100.033.682
EC Number	237-066-7
Gmelin Reference	1619
KEGG	C06701
PubChem CID	107909
RTECS number	SZ6400000
UNII	35V6A8JW8E
UN number	2834
CompTox Dashboard (EPA)	DTXSID2049715
- InChI: InChI=1S/H3O3P/c1-4(2)3/h4H,(H2,1,2,3) Key: ABLZXFCXXLZCGV-UHFFFAOYSA-N; InChI=1/H3O3P/c1-4(2)3/h4H,(H2,1,2,3) Key: ABLZXFCXXLZCGV-UHFFFAOYAF
- SMILES: HP(O)(OH)_{2}: OP(=O)O; P(OH)_{3}: OP(O)O

Properties
Chemical formula	H_{3}PO_{3}
Molar mass	81.99 g/mol
Appearance	white solid deliquescent
Density	1.651 g/cm^{3} (21 °C)
Melting point	73.6 °C (164.5 °F; 346.8 K)
Boiling point	200 °C (392 °F; 473 K) (decomposes)
Solubility in water	310 g/100 mL
Solubility	soluble in ethanol
Acidity (pK_{a})	1.3, 6.7
Magnetic susceptibility (χ)	−42.5·10^{−6} cm^{3}/mol

Structure
Molecular shape	pseudo-tetrahedral

Hazards
- Occupational safety and health (OHS/OSH)
Main hazards	skin irritant
- GHS labelling
Pictograms	(GHS05: Corrosive) (GHS07: Exclamation mark)
Signal word	Danger
Hazard statements	H302, H314
Precautionary statements	P260, P264, P270, P280, P301+P312, P301+P330+P331, P303+P361+P353, P304+P340, P305+P351+P338, P310, P321, P330, P363, P405, P501
NFPA 704 (fire diamond)	3 0 1
Safety data sheet (SDS)	Sigma-Aldrich

Related compounds
Related compounds	H_{3}PO_{4} (i.e., PO(OH)_{3}); H_{3}PO_{2} (i.e., H_{2}PO(OH))
- Except where otherwise noted, data are given for materials in their standard state (at 25 °C [77 °F], 100 kPa). verify (what is ?) Infobox references

Phosphorous acid (or phosphonic acid) is the compound described by the formula H_{3}PO_{3}. It is diprotic (readily ionizes two protons), not triprotic as might be suggested by its formula. Phosphorous acid is an intermediate in the preparation of other phosphorus compounds. Organic derivatives of phosphorous acid, compounds with the formula RPO_{3}H_{2}, are called phosphonic acids.

== Nomenclature and tautomerism ==
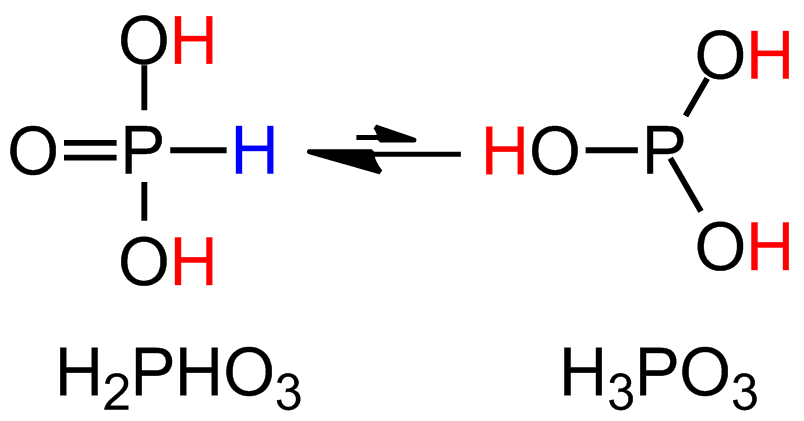

Solid HP(O)(OH)_{2} has tetrahedral geometry about the central phosphorus atom, with a P-H bond of 132 pm, one P=O double bond of 148 pm and two longer P-OH single bonds of 154 pm. In common with other phosphorus oxides with P-H bonds (e.g.hypophosphorous acid and dialkyl phosphites), it exists in equilibrium with an extremely minor tautomer P(OH)_{3}. (In contrast, arsenous acid's major tautomer is the trihydroxy form.) IUPAC recommends that the trihydroxy form P(OH)_{3} be called phosphorous acid, and the dihydroxy form HP(O)(OH)_{2} phosphonic acid. Only the reduced phosphorus compounds are spelled with an "-ous" ending.

P^{III}(OH)_{3} ⇌ HP^{V}(O)(OH)_{2} K = 10^{10.3} (25°C, aqueous)

== Preparation ==
On an industrial scale, the acid is prepared by hydrolysis of phosphorus trichloride with water or steam:

PCl_{3} + 3 H_{2}O → HPO(OH)_{2} + 3 HCl

HPO(OH)_{2} could be produced by the hydrolysis of phosphorus trioxide:

P_{4}O_{6} + 6 H_{2}O → 4 HPO(OH)_{2}

== Reactions ==
=== Acid–base properties ===
Phosphorous acid has a pK_{a} in the range 1.26–1.3.

HP(O)(OH)_{2} → HP(O)_{2}(OH)^{−} + H^{+} pK_{a} = 1.3

It is a diprotic acid, the hydrogenphosphite ion, HP(O)_{2}(OH)^{−} is a weak acid:

HP(O)_{2}(OH)^{−} → HPO_{3}^{2−} + H^{+} pK_{a} = 6.7

The conjugate base HP(O)_{2}(OH)^{−} is called hydrogen phosphite, and the second conjugate base, HPO_{3}^{2−}, is the phosphite ion. (Note that the IUPAC recommendations are hydrogen phosphonate and phosphonate respectively).

The hydrogen atom bonded directly to the phosphorus atom is not readily ionizable. Chemistry examinations often test students' appreciation of the fact that not all three hydrogen atoms are acidic under aqueous conditions, in contrast with H_{3}PO_{4}.

=== Redox properties ===
On heating at 200 °C, phosphorous acid disproportionates to phosphoric acid and phosphine:

4 H_{3}PO_{3} → 3 H_{3}PO_{4} + PH_{3}

This reaction is used for laboratory-scale preparations of PH_{3}.

Phosphorous acid slowly oxidizes in air to phosphoric acid.

Both phosphorous acid and its deprotonated forms are good reducing agents, although not necessarily quick to react. They are oxidized to phosphoric acid or its salts. It reduces solutions of noble metal cations to the metals. When phosphorous acid is treated with a cold solution of mercuric chloride, a white precipitate of mercurous chloride forms:

H_{3}PO_{3} + 2 HgCl_{2} + H_{2}O → Hg_{2}Cl_{2} + H_{3}PO_{4} + 2 HCl

Mercurous chloride is reduced further by phosphorous acid to mercury on heating or on standing:

H_{3}PO_{3} + Hg_{2}Cl_{2} + H_{2}O → 2 Hg + H_{3}PO_{4} + 2 HCl

=== As a ligand ===
Structure of Mo(CO)_{5}P(OH)_{3}.

Upon treatment with metals of d^{6} configuration, phosphorous acid is known to coordinate as the otherwise rare P(OH)_{3} tautomer. Examples include Mo(CO)_{5}(P(OH)_{3}) and [Ru(NH_{3})_{4}(H_{2}O)(P(OH)_{3})]^{2+}.

Heating a mixture of potassium tetrachloroplatinate and phosphorous acid gives the luminescent salt potassium diplatinum(II) tetrakispyrophosphite:

2 K_{2}PtCl_{4} + 8 H_{3}PO_{3} → K_{4}[Pt_{2}(HO_{2}POPO_{2}H)_{4}] + 8 HCl + 4 H_{2}O

== Uses ==
The most important use of phosphorous acid (phosphonic acid) is the production of basic lead phosphite, which is a stabilizer in PVC and related chlorinated polymers.

It is used in the production of basic lead phosphonate PVC stabilizer, aminomethylene phosphonic acid and hydroxyethane diphosphonic acid. It is also used as a strong reducing agent and in the production of synthetic fibres, organophosphorus pesticides, and the highly efficient water treatment agent ATMP.

Ferrous materials, including steel, may be somewhat protected by promoting oxidation ("rust") and then converting the oxidation to a metalophosphate by using phosphoric acid and further protected by surface coating. (See: Passivation (chemistry)).

== Organic derivatives ==
The IUPAC (mostly organic) name is phosphonic acid. This nomenclature is commonly reserved for substituted derivatives, that is, organic group bonded to phosphorus, not simply an ester. For example, (CH_{3})PO(OH)_{2} is "methylphosphonic acid", which may of course form "methylphosphonate" esters.
